= Gorgonops =

Gorgonops Temporal range: Middle—Late Permian (Capitanian to Wuchiapingian) 260–254 Ma
- Partial cranial of SAM-PK-K10591 (G. torvus)

Scientific classification
- Kingdom: Animalia
- Phylum: Chordata
- Clade: Synapsida
- Clade: Therapsida
- Clade: †Gorgonopsia
- Genus: †Gorgonops; Owen, 1876

Type species
- †Gorgonops torvus Owen, 1876

Species requiring reassessment
- †G. longifrons Haughton, 1915; †G. whaitsi Broom, 1912

Extinct genus of therapsids

Gorgonops (from Greek: Γοργών 'Gorgon' and ὤψ 'eye, face', literally 'Gorgon eye' or 'Gorgon face') is an extinct genus of gorgonopsian therapsid, of which it is the type genus. Gorgonops lived from the latest Middle Permian to the Late Permian (Capitanian to Wuchiapingian), about 260–254 Ma in what is now South Africa, Tanzania, and Zambia. The genus consists of three species, G. torvus, G. longifrons, and G. whaitsi, although the latter two species have been questioned and require reassessment. Currently, G. torvus is considered to be the only valid species. G. torvus was a medium sized gorgonopsian with a skull length of 30 centimetres (12 in), and weighing 22.8 kg (50 lb).

Gorgonopsians were an extinct clade of carnivorous therapsids that first appeared either during the Middle or (Early) Permian. They were the first group of therapsids to evolve saber-like canines. They were subordinate to dinocephalians and basal therocephalians during the Middle Permian, with the exception of the Phorcyidae, which were the top predators of their localities. Gorgonops would appear in the fossil record shortly after the primary phase of the Capitanian mass extinction, where it coexisted with surviving basal therocephalians. Following the extinction of therocephalians, gorgonopsians would replace them as the dominant large predators of the Late Permian.

== Classification ==
=== History of discovery ===
The skeleton of specimen SAM-PK-K10591. Figure (A) is the photograph of the skeleton, while figure (B) is the interpretative drawing.

The holotype of the type species, Gorgonops torvus, was one of the first therapsids discovered. It was described by Richard Owen in 1876. Gorgonops is known from the Endothiodon and most of the Cistecephalus Assemblage Zones. In 2023, Christian Sidor and colleagues uncovered an unnamed species of Gorgonops within the Madumabisa Mudstone Formation.

=== Proposed species ===
==== Gorgonops? whaitsi (Broom, 1912) ====
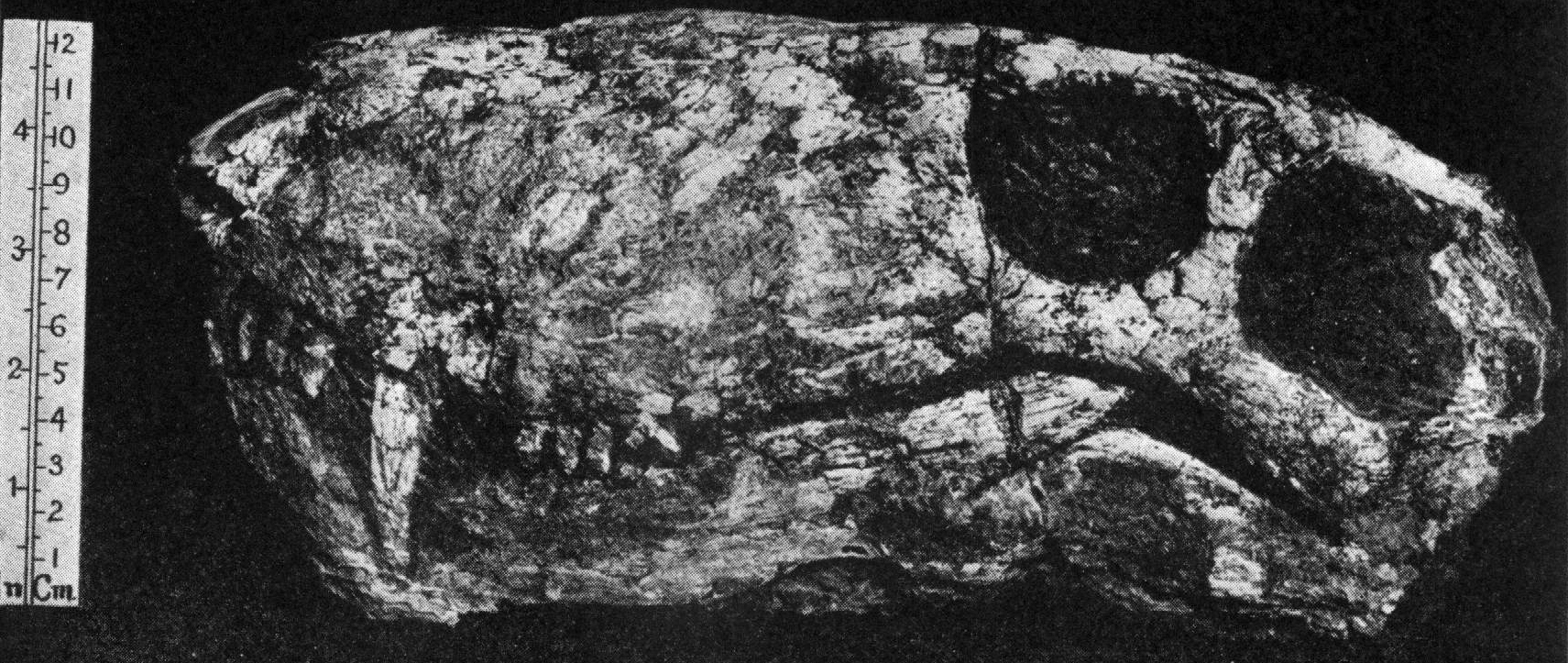
G.? whaitsi skull

G. whaitsi was described by Broom (1912) as Scymnognathus whaitsi, classifying it as a therocephalian. The holotype had a total skull length of 30 centimetres (12 in), with crushed skull possibly reaching 32.5 centimetres (12.8 in). Despite being known from a large number of specimens from the Karoo Basin, Beaufort West (Tropidostoma/Cistecephalus Assemblage Zone), the species remains poorly known. Watson and Romer placed Gorgonops and Scymnognathus in two different families. Later, Sigogneau-Russell placed the two species in the same genus, and considers G. whaitsi a more primitive (less derived) form. However, experts over the recent years have questioned its placement within the genus.

==== Gorgonops? longifrons (Haughton, 1915) ====
A large specimen known from an incomplete and flattened skull about 35 centimetres (14 in) long. Orbit larger and snout longer than G. whaitsi, from which it may have descended. Beaufort West, Tropidostoma/Cistecephalus Assemblage Zone. Synonyms: Gorgonognathus longifrons (Haughton, 1915)

==== Gorgonops? eupachygnathus (Watson, 1921) ====
A flattened, incomplete, medium-sized skull, probably a juvenile of either G. torvus or G. whaitsi. Synonyms: Leptotrachelus eupachygnathus (Watson, 1921); Leptotracheliscops eupachygnathus (Watson, 1921)

==== Gorgonops? dixeyi (Haughton, 1926) ====
A large, incomplete and flattened skull, from Chiweta Beds, Nyassaland. Placement uncertain. Probably Low Cistecephalus Assemblage Zone equivalent (= middle of the Wuchiapingian Stage). Synonyms: Chiwetasaurus dixeyi (Haughton, 1926)

==== Gorgonops? kaiseri (Broili & Schroeder, 1934) ====
A large (about 35 centimetres (14 in) long), incomplete skull, with a high snout and narrower in the rear than other species, from the "High Tapinocephalus zone" (earlier than the other species, most probably Pristerognathus Assemblage Zone) Synonyms: Pachyrhinos kaiseri (Broili & Schroeder, 1934)

=== Taxonomy ===
Upon the discovery of Gorgonops and other gorgonopsians, Owen presumed they were ectothermic reptiles, despite the dentition similarities with mammals. He proposed classifying gorgonopsians under the newly coined order, Theriodontia. Owen decided to subdivide Theriodontia into families based on the anatomy of the nostrils (the bony narials)—"Mononarialia" for those with one opening in the skull for the nose as in mammals, "Binarialia" for those with two openings as in reptiles, and "Tectinarialia" for Gorgonops because its opening was overshadowed by a thick bone roof. In 1890, Lydekker would consider Gorgonops as the type species of Gorgonopsidae. Later, in 1895, Harry Govier Seeley used this genus to establish the larger clade of Gorgonopsia.

In 1903, Henry Fairfield Osborn completely reworked the classification of Reptilia, and erected two major groups: Diapsida and Synapsida, and in 1905, South African palaeontologist Robert Broom created a third group, Therapsida, to house the "mammal-like reptiles", including Theriodontia. He also challenged Seeley's claim and relegated Gorgonops back to Theriodontia, but he placed it into his newly erected subgroup Therocephalia, dissolving Gorgonopsia. In 1913, especially in light of an almost complete G. torvus skull discovered by the Reverend John H. Whaits, Broom reinstated Gorgonopsia.

Below is a cladogram from Gebauer's 2007 phylogenetic analysis.

- Gorgonopsia
  - Aloposaurus
  - - Cyonosaurus
    - - Aelurosaurus
      - Gorgonopsidae
        - Scylacognathus
        - - Eoarctops
          - Gorgonops
          - - Njalila
            - - Lycaenops
              - - Arctognathus
                - - Inostrancevia
                  - Rubidgeinae
                    - Aelurognathus
                    - - Rubidgea
                      - - Sycosaurus
                        - Clelandina

Kammerer (2017) revised the phylogeny of gorgonopsians recovering Eriphostoma and Gorgonops as the most basal gorgonopsians. A year later, Kammerer and Masyutin revised the phylogeny of gorgonopsians, recovering two major clades, the African and Russian clade, with Gorgonops being nested within the latter clade. The African clade within the paper consisted of entirely African gorgonopsians, with Gorgonops being one of the earliest diverging African gorgonopsians. In 2022, following Phorcys being described, Kammerer and Rubidge recovered an polytomy between Eriphostoma, Gorgonops, and Phorcys. Within the same year, Kammerer and colleagues would describe Inostrancevia africana, which challenged the hypothesis that each clade was restricted to a certain distribution. Following the discovery of Jirahgorgon, Macungo et al. (2026) recovered Gorgonops as a sister taxon to the family Phorcyidae within a basally branching subclade of African gorgonopsians. Cladogram recovered by Macungo et al. (2026):

- Gorgonopsia
  - Nochnitsa
  - - Viatkogorgon
    - - "Russian clade"
        - Suchogorgon
        - - Sauroctonus
          - - Pravoslavlevia
            - Inostrancevia
      - "African clade"
        - - Eriphostoma
          - - Gorgonops
            - - Jirahgorgon
              - Phorcys
        - - Cynariops
          - - Lycaenops
            - - - Arctops
                - - DA21/17-01-01
                    (Port des Canonge Fm. gorgonopsian)
                  - Smilesaurus
              - - Arctognathus
                - Rubidgeinae

The oldest definitive gorgonopsian was recovered from the Mediterranean island of Mallorca, and which probably dates to the earliest Wordian of the Middle Permian. However, stratigraphic position of the gorgonopsian, as well as surrounding fossil track record may suggest it is significantly older, potentially Roadian stage of the Middle Permian, with a possibility to dating to the Kungurian or Artinskian stages of the Early Permian. Gorgonopsians were the first group of therapsids to evolve sabertooth canines, before the appearance of dinosaurs or mammals. Saberteeth would later appear in machaeroidines, nimravids, thylacosmilids, and machairodonts during the Cenozoic. During the Middle Permian, gorgonopsians were subordinate to basal therocephalians, another group of sabertooth therapsids, and dinocephalians. However, Phorcyidae were an exception as they were likely being the apex predators of their locality. Following the extinction of dinocephalians and basal therocephalians, gorgonopsians would become the dominant predators of the Late Permian. Geographically, gorgonopsians are mainly recovered in the present territories of Africa and European Russia, however, an indeterminate specimen having been identified in the Turpan Depression, in northwestern China, as well as a possible fragmentary specimen discovered in the Kundaram Formation, located in central India.

== Description ==
=== Size ===
SAM-PK-K10591 was estimated to have a skull length of 30 centimetres (12 in), although the exact measurement is unclear due to the damage. The size of the skull of SAM-PK-K1059 suggests this specimen was an adult compared to other specimens. Bendel et al. (2023) estimated that SAM-PK-K10591 had a body mass between 72.9–145.6 kg (161–321 lb), with the mean body mass being 98.1 kg (216 lb). Although, the authors noted there currently isn't no mass regression based gorgonopsian postcranial. Kulik (2025) suggested a significantly smaller size for the same specimen, weighing 22.8 kg (50 lb), ranging from 17.1–28.5 kg (38–63 lb).

=== Skull ===
G. torvus had a relatively long snout, with the premaxilla consisting of five typical incisors, which is typical for most gorgonopsians and The skull lacked pachyostosis. The species had four to five upper postcanines, with the difference being the result of individual variation. The lateral boarders of the skull were smooth and boarded slightly posterior, with no presence of deep depression or deflection on the facial part of the jugal nor zygomatic arches. As noted in many gorgonopsians, the skull widens posteriorly. The septomaxilla is found to have directed posterodorsally, with the ventral border of the maxilla exhibiting a small, step-like, ventrally directed bend anterior to the canines.

=== Postcranial anatomy ===
==== Vertebrae ====
The number of presacral vertebrae in gorgonopsians was similar to therocephalians, with seven cervical and 20 dorsal vertebrae. Although minor variation between genera such as Viatkogorgon and “Sauroctonus” parringtoni. SAM-PK-K10591 had only six vertebrae that were still preserved in the articulation. Within the number of 26 vertebrae recovered, three were likely cervical, 12 were dorsal, and 11 were caudals.

==== Ribs ====
Ribs of SAM-PK-K10591

The preserved ribs of SAM-PK-K10591 were long and slender and were mostly in articulation. Some of the additional ribs were loosely scattered, with a few being preserved as fragments. The longest preserved ribs were 15–17 centimetres (5.9–6.7 in). The posteriormost dorsal ribs appeared to be shorter and thicker than the other ribs, with its differing morphology suggesting it may be a lumbar rib. However, it could also be broken off distally.

== Paleobiology ==
Biomechanical analysis of various sabertooth predators by Lautenschlager et al. (2020) found G. torvus had a maximum jaw gap of 68.11° and an effective jaw gape of 48°. The authors concluded due to the actual jaw gapes were below 80° and effective jaw gape below 60°, gorgonopsians were likely specialized on prey either smaller or similar in size. Their model size estimates that G. torvus had a bite force of 116 newtons.

Postcranial analysis on SAM-PK-K10591 found the gorgonopsian had a crucial index close to that of Thylacosmilus, with the similarities of both predators having robust forelimbs and gracile forelimbs. However, the case of Gorgonops was thought to have been the result of its semi-erect posture. Its semi-erect posture, semiplantigrade gait, and robust forelimbs and slender hindlimb, and relatively short tibia suggests it was an ambush predator that used its robust forelimbs to grapple prey.

== Paleoecology ==
=== Endothiodon Assemblage Zone ===
The type species, G. torvus, was found within the Endothiodon Assemblage Zone, first appearing in the lower Lycosuchus-Eunotosaurus Subzone. The subzone follows after the primary phase of the Capitanian mass extinction, which saw the extinction of dinocephalians and bradysaurians pareiasaurs. The recovery phase of the mass extinction coincided with the appearance of the mid-sized dicynodont Endothiodon and Gorgonops.

=== Usili Formation ===
Gorgonops remains have been recovered within Usili Formation of Tanzania, which yielded a diversity of therapsids. Gorgonopsians were represented as Scylacops, Lycaenops, the inostranceviine Inostrancevia africana, and rubidgeines such as Ruhuhucerberus, Aelurognathus, Dinogorgon, and Rubidgea. Therocephalians present were represented by Theriognathus and Ictidosuchoides, with cynodonts being solely represented by Procynosuchus delaharpeae. Dicynodonts were highly diverse consisting of several genera including Compsodon, Daptocephalus, Dicynodon, Dicynodontoides, Oudenodon bainii, Endothiodon bathystoma, Geikia locusticeps and Rhachiocephalus. Non-synapsid tetrapods included pareiasaurs Anthodon serrarius and Pareiasaurus serridens and the temnospondyl Peltobatrachus.

The formation likely correlated to the upper Cistecephalus Assemblage Zone to lower Daptocephalus Assemblage Zone. The depositional environment of the formationw as thought to have been alluvial plain, which had numerous small meandering streams passing through well-vegetated floodplains. The basement of this formation would also have housed a generally high phreatic zone.

== See also ==
- List of therapsids
- Gorgonopsia
