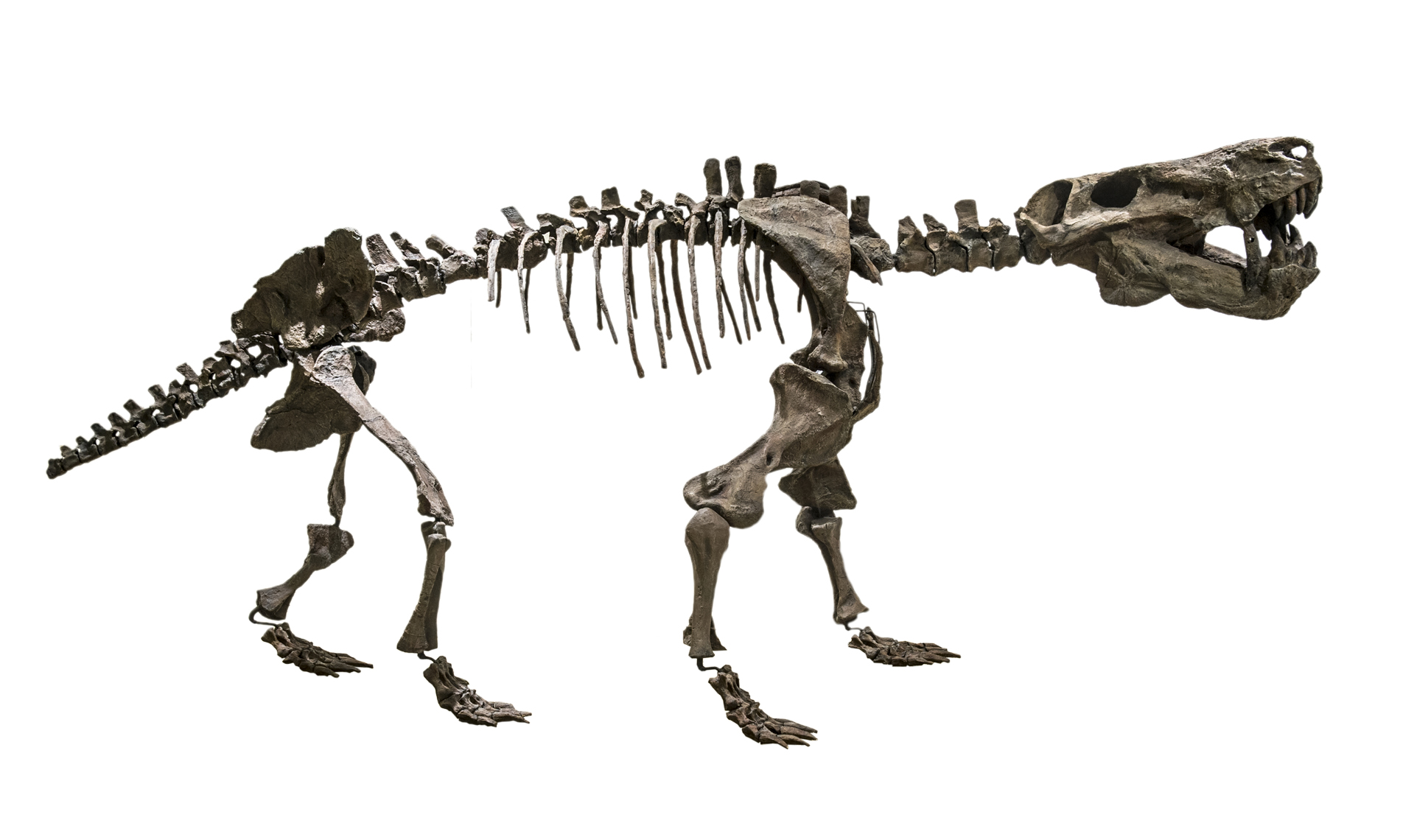
- Skeleton of Inostrancevia alexandri at the Museo delle Scienze, Trento, Italy

Scientific classification
- Kingdom: Animalia
- Phylum: Chordata
- Clade: Synapsida
- Clade: Therapsida
- Clade: Theriodontia
- Clade: †Gorgonopsia; Seeley, 1894

Subgroups
- See Classification below
Possible gorgonopsians
- †Kamagorgon
- †Dinosaurus

= Gorgonopsia =

Gorgonopsians Temporal range: Middle Permian - Late Permian 270–251.9 Ma Possible latest Early Permian record

Extinct group of saber-toothed therapsids from the Permian

Gorgonopsia (from the Greek Gorgon, a mythological monster, and óps 'aspect') is an extinct clade of sabre-toothed therapsids from the Middle to the Upper Permian, roughly between 270 and 252 million years ago. They are characterised by a long and narrow skull, as well as elongated upper and sometimes lower canine teeth and incisors which were likely used as slashing and stabbing weapons. Postcanine teeth are generally reduced or absent. For hunting large prey, they possibly used a bite-and-retreat tactic, ambushing and taking a debilitating bite out of the target, and following it at a safe distance before its injuries exhausted it, whereupon the gorgonopsian would grapple the animal and deliver a killing bite. They would have had an exorbitant gape, possibly in excess of 90°, without having to unhinge the jaw.

They markedly increased in size as time went on, growing from small skull lengths of 10–15 cm (4–6 in) in the Middle Permian to bear-like proportions of up to 60 cm (2 ft) in the Upper Permian. Rubidgeinae were the most robust of the group and could produce especially powerful bites. Gorgonopsians are thought to have been completely terrestrial and could walk with a semi-erect gait, with a similar terrestrial locomotory range as modern crocodilians. They may have been more agile than their prey items, but were probably inertial homeotherms rather than endotherms unlike contemporary therocephalians and cynodonts, and thus were probably comparatively less active. Though gorgonopsians were able to maintain a rather high body temperature, it is unclear if they would have also had sweat glands or fur (and by extension whiskers and related structures). Their brains were reminiscent of modern reptilian brains, rather than those of living mammals. Most species may have been predominantly diurnal (active during the day) though some could have been crepuscular (active at dawn or dusk) or nocturnal (active at night). They are thought to have had binocular vision, a parietal eye (which detects sunlight and maintains circadian rhythm), a keen sense of smell, a functional vomeronasal organ ("Jacobson's organ"), and possibly a rudimentary eardrum.

The major therapsid groups had all evolved by 275 million years ago from a "pelycosaur" ancestor (a poorly defined group including all synapsids which are not therapsids). The therapsid takeover from pelycosaurs took place by the Middle Permian as the world progressively became drier. Gorgonopsians rose to become apex predators of their environments following the Capitanian mass extinction event which killed off the dinocephalians and most basal therocephalians after the Middle Permian. Despite the existence of a single continent during the Permian, Pangaea, gorgonopsians are only known from few regions around the world. They are primarily found in the Karoo Supergroup of southern Africa (mainly South Africa, but also Tanzania, Zambia, and Malawi), as well as in Niger, Russia, and China, with a possible occurrence also reported from India and Uruguay. These places were semi-arid areas with highly seasonal rainfall. The oldest known gorgonopsian, dated to the Middle Permian, comes from the Spanish island of Mallorca, western Mediterranean. Gorgonopsian genera are all very similar in appearance, and consequently many species have been named based on flimsy and likely age-related differences since their discovery in the late 19th century, and the group has been subject to several taxonomic revisions.

The last gorgonopsians became extinct during a phase of the Permian–Triassic extinction event taking place at the very end of the Permian, in which major volcanic activity (which would produce the Siberian Traps) and resultant massive spike in greenhouse gases caused rapid aridification due to temperature spike, acid rain, frequent wildfires, and potential breakdown of the ozone layer. The large predatory niches once occupied by gorgonopsians were would be taken over by the archosaurs (namely crocodilians and dinosaurs) in the Mesozoic.

== Description ==
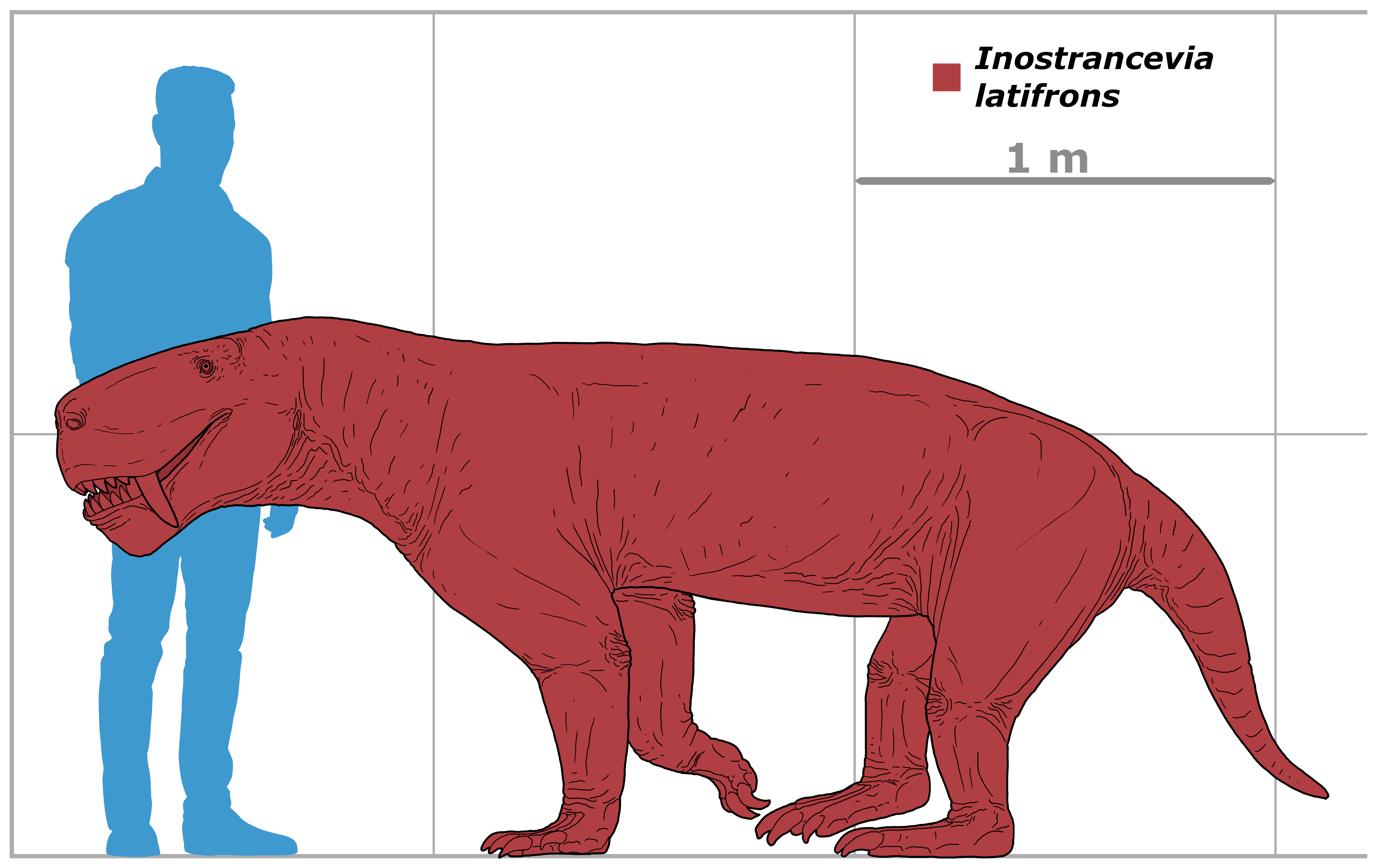
Size comparison of Inostrancevia latifrons, the largest known gorgonopsian, compared to a human

Earlier gorgonopsids in the Middle Permian were quite small, with skull lengths of 10–15 cm (4–6 in), whereas some later genera attained massive, bear-like sizes with the largest being Inostrancevia latifrons, which measured to 3.5 m (11 ft) in length and 300 kg (660 lb) in body mass for a 60 cm (24 in) long skull. Nonetheless, small gorgonopsians remained abundant until the extinction of the clade, although some small genera may actually represent juvenile specimens of larger genera.

Like other Permian therapsids, gorgonopsians had developed several mammalian characteristics. These might have included a parasagittal gait (the limbs were vertically oriented and moved parallel to the spine) as opposed to the sprawling gait of amphibians and earlier synapsids. This gait change in therapsids was possibly related to the reduction in tail size and phalangeal formula (the number of bones per digit, which for gorgonopsians was 2.3.4.5.3 like reptiles). Other developments included fibrous lamellar cortical bone and deeply-set teeth. Like reptiles, gorgonopsians lack a secondary palate separating the mouth from the nasal cavity, prohibiting chewing.

=== Skull ===
Anatomy varies incredibly little between gorgonopsians. Many species are distinguished by vague proportional differences, and consequently smaller species may actually represent juveniles of larger taxa. Notably, the vomer at the tip of the snout varies among species in terms of the degree of its expansion, as well as the positions, degree of splay, and shape of the 3 ridges. They typically feature a long and narrow skull. Juvenile Rubidgea appear to have had snouts wider than long. Unlike eutheriodonts, the occipital bone (at the back of the skull) is rectangular (wider than tall) and concave, as opposed to triangular.

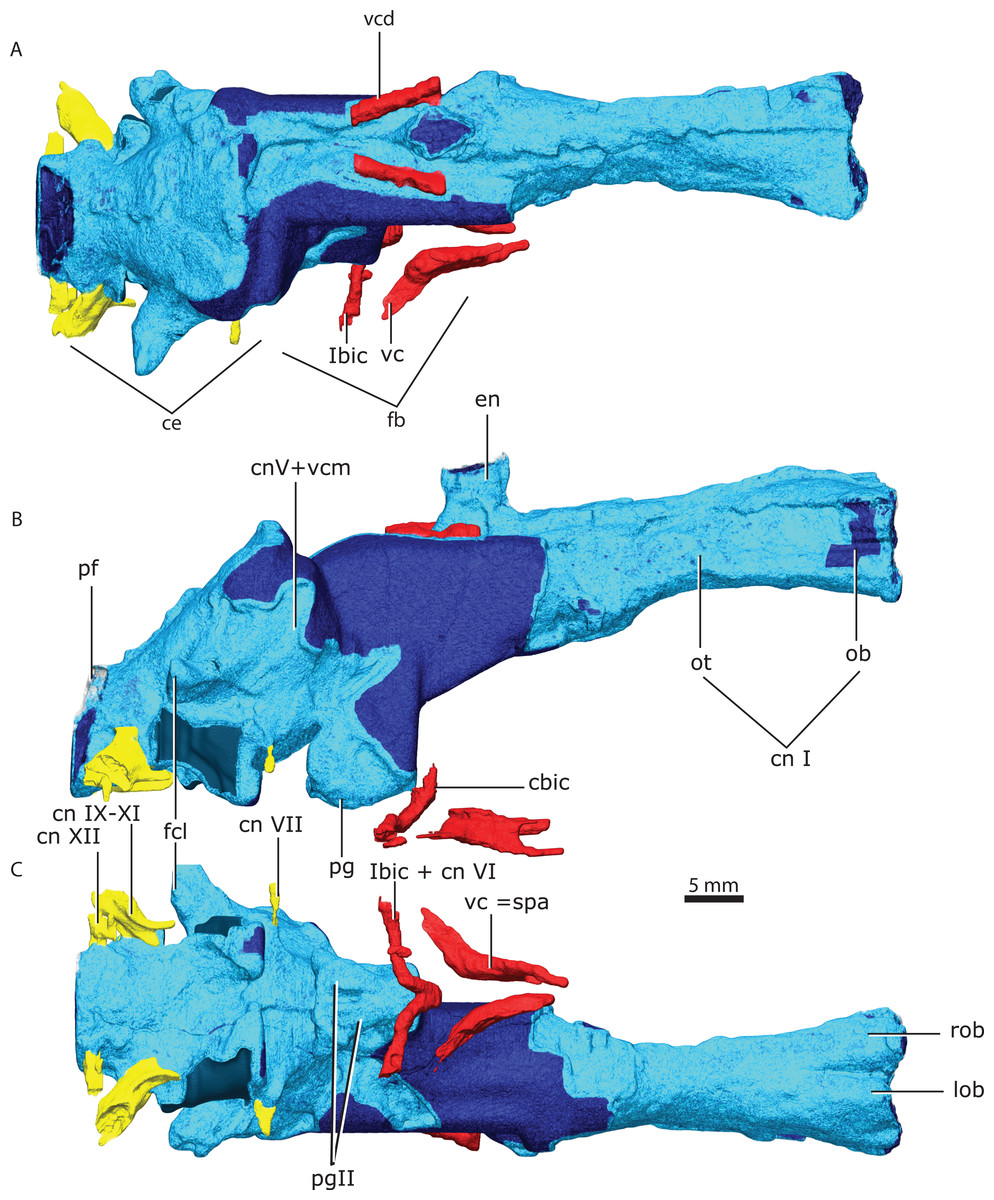
Gorgonopsian brain reconstruction (A. top, B. side, C. underside) (Note: ce, cerebellum; cnI, olfactory nerve; cnV +vcm—trigeminal nerve and vena capitis medialis; cnVI, abducens nerve; cnVII, facial nerve; cnIX-XI, glossopharyngeal and vagoaccessory nerves; cnXII, hypoglossal nerve; en, epiphyseal nerve; fb, forebrain; fcl, flocculus; ibic, internal branch of the internal carotid; lob, left olfactory bulb; ob, olfactory bulb; ot, olfactory tract; pg, pituitary gland; pgll, pituitary gland lateral lobes; pf, pontine flexure; rob, right olfactory bulb; vc, vidian canal; vc=spa, vidian canal where the sphenopalatine artery passes; vcd, vena capitis dorsalis)

The gorgonopsian brain, like other non-mammaliaform therapsids, lacks an expansion of the neocortex, has a relatively large hindbrain compared to the forebrain, a large epyphysial nerve (found in creatures with a parietal eye on the top of the head), an enlarged pituitary gland, and an overall elongated shape; all-in-all resembling a reptilian brain. The braincase was also rather reptilian, and is also comparatively smaller and not as thick as those of mammals. The flocculus, a lobe of the cerebellum, is proportionally large, and is related to the vestibulo-ocular reflex (which stabilises gaze while moving the head). Judging by the orientation of the semi-circular canals in the ear (which have to be oriented parallel to the ground), the head of the gorgonopsian specimen GPIT/RE/7124 would have tilted forward by about 41°, increasing the overlap between the visual fields of the two eyes and improving binocular vision—useful to a predator. Unlike either reptiles or mammals, the semi-circular canals are flat, probably because they were wedged between the opisthotic (an inner ear bone) and supraoccipital bones.

=== Teeth ===
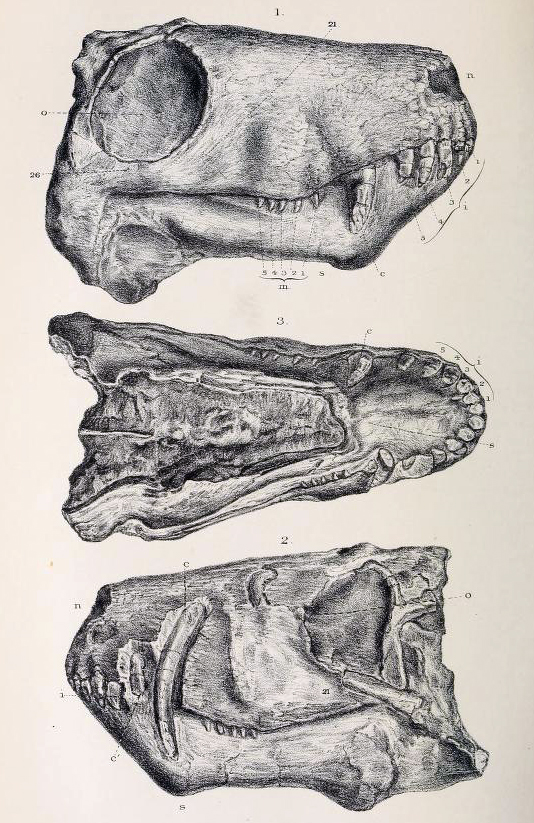
Skull of Aelurosaurus felinus showing tooth arrangement, dual canines, and canine root depth

Like many mammals, gorgonopsians were heterodonts, with clearly defined incisors, canines, and postcanine teeth homologous with premolars and molars. They had five incisors in the upper jaw (for most, the first three were the same size as each other, and the last two were shorter) and four on the bottom.

In the majority of gorgonopsians, the incisors were large, and the upper canines were elongated into sabres, much like those of later sabre-toothed cats. Some gorgonopsians had exceptionally long upper canines, such as Inostrancevia, and some of them had a flange on the lower jaw to sheath the tip of the canine while the mouth was closed. Sabres are generally interpreted as having been used as stabbing or slashing weapons, which would have required an extremely wide gape. Both the upper and lower canines of Rubidgea were elongated, and the animal would have needed an even greater gape. The serration pattern of gorgonopsians was most similar to those of theropod dinosaurs than to other synapsids. The palate also features tuberosities and ridges which oftentimes have functional teeth, which may have been used to hold onto struggling prey, diverting these powerful forces away from the fragile canines. Similar ridges have been identified on the machairodont Homotherium. The postcanine teeth were reduced in both size and number; many rubidgeines (the latest gorgonopsians) did not have postcanines in the lower jaw, and Clelandina lacked them entirely.

Gorgonopsians were polyphyodonts, and teeth grew continuously throughout an individual's life. Like some therapsids, while there was one functional canine, another canine was growing to replace it when it inevitably broke off. The left and right sides of the jaws did not have to be synchronous, so, for example, the first canine on the left side could be functional while the first canine on the right side was still growing. Such a method might have been in play so as always to have a set of functional canines, as having a single or no canines would have severely impeded hunting, and growing such large teeth took a long time. On the other hand, because the functional canine is typically found in the foremost tooth socket (instead of equal occurrence in either socket), it is possible that canine replacement occurred a finite number of times, and the animal would eventually be left with a single, permanent set of functional canines in these sockets. In 1984, British palaeontologists Doris and Kenneth Kermack suggested that the canines grew to match the size of the skull, and continually broke off until the animal stopped growing, and that gorgonopsians featured an early version of finite tooth replacement exhibited in many mammals. The tooth replacement patterns of the other teeth are unclear. The postcanine teeth were replaced more slowly than the other teeth, likely due to their lack of functional significance.

=== Postcranium ===
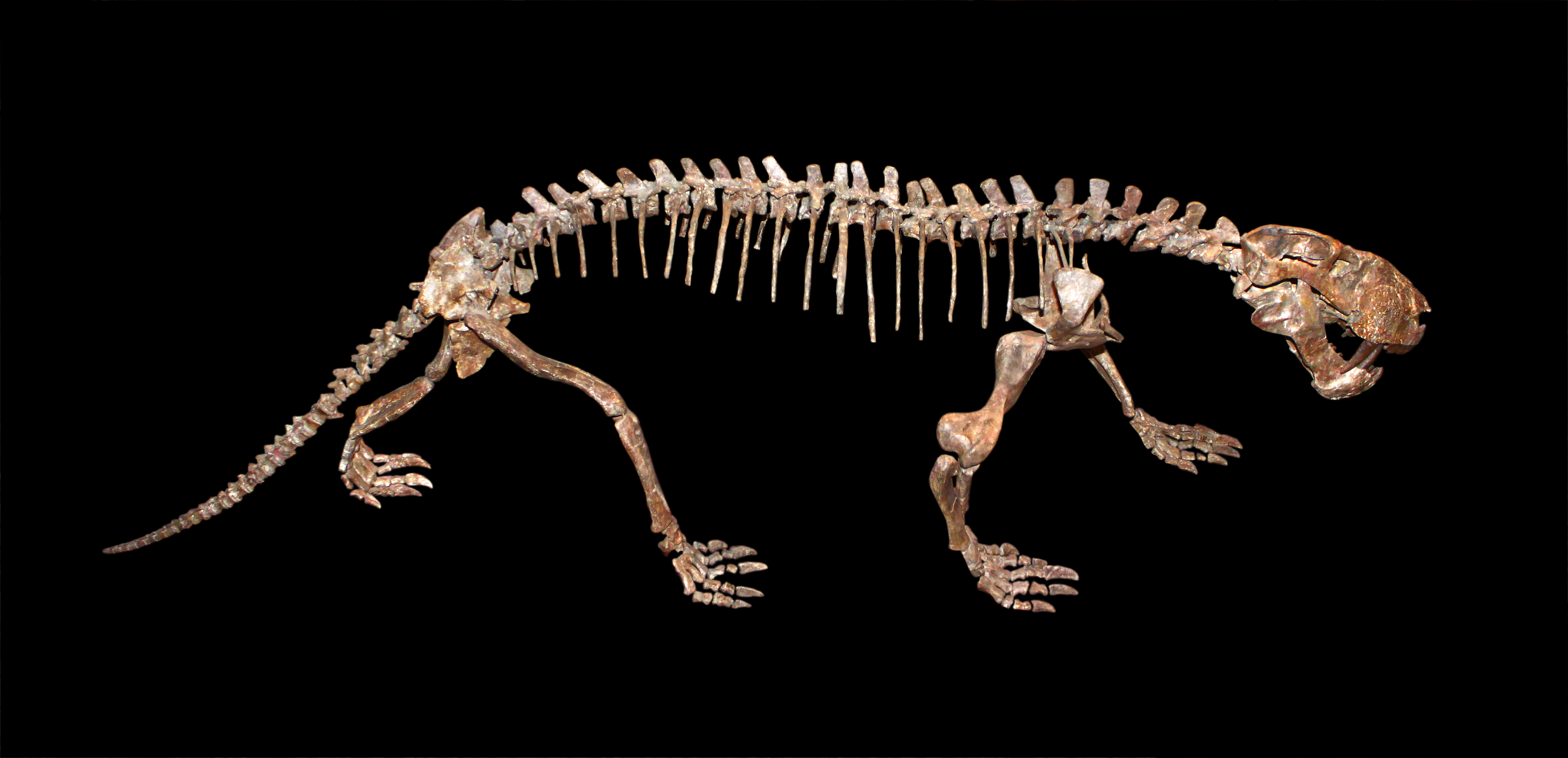
Skeleton of a specimen numbered as GPIT-PV-31579

The seven cervical vertebrae (in the neck) are all the same size as each other except for the last one, which is shorter and lower; there is one atlas and one axis. Like sabre-toothed cats, the neck is long with well-developed muscles, which would have been especially useful when the canines were sunk into an animal. Like other early synapsids, gorgonopsians have a single occipital condyle, and the articulation (the joints) of the cervical vertebrae is overall reptilian, permitting side-to-side movement of the head but restricting up-and-down motion. The last cervical is shaped more like the dorsal vertebrae.

The dorsals are spool-shaped and all appear about the same as each other. The spinous processes jut out steeply from the centra, and feature sharp keels on the front and back sides. Unlike eutheriodonts, gorgonopsians do not have distinguished lumbar vertebrae. Nonetheless, the dorsals equating to that series are similar to the lumbars of sabre-toothed cats with steeply oriented zygopophases, useful in stabilising the lower back especially when pinning down struggling prey.

There are three sacral vertebrae, and the series attached to the pelvis by the first vertebra. The pelvis is reptilian, with separated ilium, ischium, and pubis. The femur is slightly s-shaped, and is short but longer and slenderer than the humerus. For most, the tibia and fibula strongly curve into each other, and the tibia is more robust than the fibula. The joint between the ankle and the heel bones may have been somewhat mobile. The fifth digit for both the hands and feet was not attached to the carpus/tarsus, and instead connected directly to the ulna/heel bone.

== Taxonomy ==
=== Fossil bearing sites ===
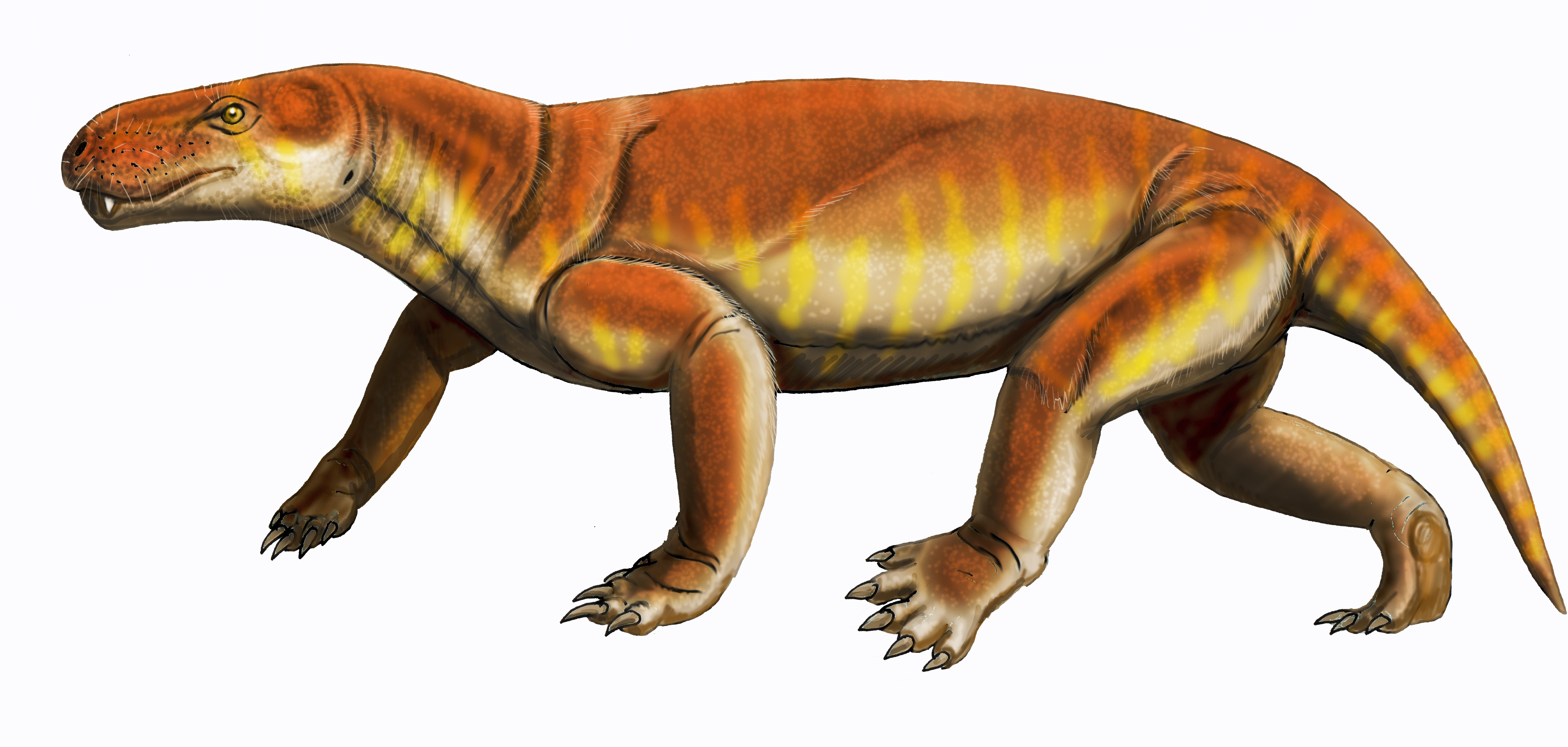
Reconstruction of Gorgonops

In 1876, the first gorgonopsian remains were identified in the Beaufort Group of the Karoo Supergroup of South Africa, by the biologist and paleontologist Richard Owen. He classified the fossils as Gorgonops torvus, combining the Greek Gorgon, a mythological beast, with the word óps (ὄψ), meaning 'aspect'. In Africa, gorgonopsians have also been found in Karoo outcroppings in the Ruhuhu Valley of Tanzania, the Upper Luangwa Valley of Zambia, and Chiweta, Malawi.

Gorgonopsians were first identified in Russia in the 1890s at the Sokolki locality on the Northern Dvina under the supervision of Russian palaeontologist Vladimir Prokhorovich Amalitskii. In a posthumous publication, it was described as Inostrancevia alexandri (the genus being then spelled as Inostranzevia), and it is one of the best known and largest gorgonopsians. Since then, only a few more Russian taxa have been described: Pravoslavlevia, Sauroctonus, Viatkogorgon, Suchogorgon, and Nochnitsa.

Gorgonopsians are conspicuously rare beyond these two areas. In 1979, Chinese palaeontologist Yang Zhongjian described a Chinese gorgonopsian "Wangwusaurus tayuensis" based on teeth from the Late Permian Jiyuan Formation, but in 1981, palaeontologists Denise Sigogneau-Russell and Ai-Lin Sun found the assigned material to be a random assemblage of which only two have even a remote similarity to Gorgonopsia. In 2022, paleontologists Jun Liu and Wan Yiang confirmed the presence of a gorgonopsian in China based on an incomplete set of fossil teeth discovered in the Turpan Depression, Xinjiang. In 2003, Indian palaeontologists Sanghamitra Ray and Saswati Bandyopadhyay assigned some skull fragments from the Late Permian Kundaram Formation of the Pranhita–Godavari Basin to a medium-sized gorgonopsian, though the gorgonopsian characteristics have also been documented in some therocephalians. In 2008, a large and probably rubidgeine upper jaw fragment and canine was identified at the Late Permian Moradi Formation in Niger (one of the few low-latitude Late Permian tetrapod-bearing formations), and is the first evidence of a low-latitude gorgonopsian. A second low-latitude gorgonopsian was described in 2024 from the Port des Canonge Formation of Mallorca in the western Mediterranean. Notably, it also likely represents the oldest gorgonopsian yet known in the fossil record, constrained to a minimum age before the middle Wordian, if not pre-Wordian. This suggests that the absence of gorgonopsians from low-latitudes reflects uneven sampling rather than a true restriction to high latitudes. Possible gorgonopsian footprints have been reported in Uruguay.

=== Classification ===
Upon discovery, Owen presumed that Gorgonops and several other taxa he described from the Karoo Supergroup were cold-blooded reptiles, despite bearing teeth resembling those of carnivorous mammals. He proposed classifying all of them under the newly coined order Theriodontia (which he placed in the class Reptilia). He decided to subdivide Theriodontia into families based on the anatomy of the nostrils (the bony narials)—"Mononarialia" for those with one opening in the skull for the nose as in mammals, "Binarialia" for those with two openings as in reptiles, and "Tectinarialia" for Gorgonops because its opening was overshadowed by a thick bone roof (tectus is Latin for "covered, roofed, decked"). In 1890, English naturalist Richard Lydekker made Gorgonops the type species of the family Gorgonopsidae. (Note: In more recent classifications, the family Gorgonopsidae is generally defined to exclude the basal representatives of the Gorgonopsia.) British palaeontologist Harry Seeley in 1894 believed Gorgonops lacked an opening in the temporal bone (temporal fenestra), which is a diagnostic feature of Theriodontia, and so elevated Gorgonopsidae to Gorgonopsia, distinct from Theriodontia. He classified all South African materials bearing both reptilian and mammalian traits into the order "Theriosuchia", and considered Gorgonopsia and Theriodontia suborders of it. American palaeontologist Henry Fairfield Osborn completely reworked the classification of Reptilia in 1903, and erected two major groups: Diapsida and Synapsida, and in 1905, South African palaeontologist Robert Broom created a third group, Therapsida, to house the "mammal-like reptiles", including Theriodontia. He also challenged Seeley's claim and relegated Gorgonops back to Theriodontia, but he placed it into his newly erected subgroup Therocephalia, dissolving Gorgonopsia. In 1913, especially in light of an almost complete G. torvus skull discovered by the Reverend John H. Whaits, Broom reinstated Gorgonopsia.

The number of South African genera rapidly grew in the 20th-century, headed principally by Broom, whose extensive work on the Karoo therapsids—from the beginning of his career in the country in 1897 to his death in 1951—led to his description of 57 gorgonopsian holotype specimens and 29 genera. Many of Broom's taxa would later be invalidated. Many other contemporary workers created wholly new species or genera based on single specimens. Consequently, Gorgonopsia has been the subject of much taxonomic turmoil, and is one of the most problematic synapsid groups. Because the skull anatomy differs very little across taxa, many are defined based on vague proportional differences, including even the well-known members. Nominal species are distinguished predominantly by traits which are known to be quite variable depending on the age of the individual, including eye orbit size, snout length, and number of postcanine teeth. Thus, it is possible that some taxa are synonymous with each other, and represent different stages of development.

Among the first attempts to organise the clade was carried out by British zoologist David Meredith Seares Watson and American palaeontologist Alfred Romer in 1956, who split it into twenty families, of which the members of three (Burnetiidae, Hipposauridae, and Phthinosuchidae) are not considered gorgonopsians anymore. In 1970 and again in 1989, predominantly considering African taxa, Sigogneau-Russell published a comprehensive monograph on Gorgonopsia (defining it as an infraorder), and recognised only two families: Watongiidae and Gorgonopidae. Watongia was moved to Varanopidae in 2004 by the Canadian paleontologists Robert R. Reisz and Michel Laurin. Sigogneau-Russell split Gorgonopidae into three subfamilies—Gorgonopsinae, Rubidgeinae, and Inostranceviinae—and reduced the number of genera to twenty-three. In 2002, Russian palaeontologist Mikhail Feodosievich Ivakhnenko, considering the Russian taxa, instead considered Gorgonopsia a suborder, and grouped it together with Dinocephalia into the order "Gorgodontia". He divided Gorgonopsia into the superfamilies "Gorgonopioidea" (families Gorgonopidae, Cyonosauridae, and Galesuchidae) and "Rubidgeoidea" (Rubidgeidae, Phtinosuchidae, and Inostranceviidae). In 2007, biologist Eva V. I. Gebauer, in her comprehensive review of Gorgonopsia (her PhD dissertation), rejected Ivakhnenko's model in favour of Sigogneau-Russell's, and further reduced the number of genera to fourteen in addition to the Russian genera: Aloposaurus, Cyonosaurus, Aelurosaurus, Sauroctonus, Scylacognathus, Eoarctops, Gorgonops, Njalila (formally described in 2026), Lycaenops, Arctognathus, Aelurognathus, Sycosaurus, Clelandina, and Rubidgea. In general, Sigogneau-Russell's model is supported, but there is little consensus on which genera can be assigned to which subfamilies. In 2015, American palaeontologist Christian F. Kammerer and colleagues redescribed Eriphostoma (which was labelled as an indeterminate theriodont) as a gorgonopsian, and sunk Scylacognathus and the next year Eoarctops into it.

The first phylogeny (family tree) of the members of Gorgonopsia was published in 2016 by American palaeontologist Christian F. Kammerer, who specifically investigated Rubidgeinae, and re-described both the subfamily and the nine species he assigned to it (reducing the number from thirty-six species). Kammerer also resurrected Dinogorgon, Leontosaurus, Ruhuhucerberus, and Smilesaurus. Kammerer was unsure if Leontosaurus, Clelandina, Dinogorgon, and Rubidgea all represent the same taxon or not (for which Dinogorgon has priority), but he decided to classify all of them in the tribe Rubidgeini pending further examination. In 2018, Kammerer and Russian palaeontologist Vladimir Masyutin identified a new genus Nochnitsa as the basalmost known gorgonopsians, and found that all Russian taxa (except Viatkogorgon, which is in the outclade) form a completely separate clade from the African taxa. Also in 2018, palaeobiologist Eva-Maria Bendel, Kammerer, and colleagues resurrected Cynariops. In 2022, Kammerer and fellow palaeontologist Bruce S. Rubidge described Phorcys from South Africa. Macungo and colleagues (2026) described Jirahgorgon as a new South African taxon closely related to Phorcys. They recognised these two genera as forming a subgroup of relatively large gorgonopsians from the middle Permian, independent of later large gorgonopsians (such as Inostrancevia and rubidgeines) that they named as the new family Phorcyidae. Their phylogenetic analysis recovered these two genera in an early branching subclade of African gorgonopsians that also includes Eriphostoma and Gorgonops.

- †Gorgonopsia
  - Nochnitsa
  - - Viatkogorgon
    - - "Russian clade"
        - Suchogorgon
        - - Sauroctonus
          - - Pravoslavlevia
            - Inostrancevia
      - "African clade"
        - - Eriphostoma
          - - Gorgonops
            - - Jirahgorgon
              - Phorcys
        - - Cynariops
          - - Lycaenops
            - - - Arctops
                - - DA21/17-01-01
                    (Port des Canonge Fm. gorgonopsian)
                  - Smilesaurus
              - - Arctognathus
                - Rubidgeinae
                  - Aelurognathus
                  - - Ruhuhucerberus
                    - - - Sycosaurus
                        - Rubidgeini
                          - Leontosaurus
                          - - Dinogorgon
                            - - Clelandina
                              - Rubidgea

Phylogeny of Gorgonopsia according to Macungo et al. (2026)

=== Evolution ===
Synapsida has traditionally been split into the basal "Pelycosauria" and the derived Therapsida. The former comprises cold-blooded creatures with a sprawling gait and presumably lower metabolism which evolved in the Upper Carboniferous. Through the middle to late 20th-century, American palaeontologist Everett C. Olson investigated synapsid diversity in the Middle Permian San Angelo, Flowerpot, and Chickasha Formations in North America, and noted that pelycosaur diversity reduced from six to three in these formations, and that they coexisted with several fragmentary specimens which he interpreted as therapsids. He then suggested the adaptive shift from pelycosaur-grade to therapsid-grade took place during the Middle Permian (Olson's Extinction); however, the classification of those "therapsids" and the age of the formations have since been challenged. Thus, the exact timing of the therapsid takeover is unclear, but the six major therapsid groups (Biarmosuchia, Dinocephalia, Anomodontia, Gorgonopsia, Therocephalia, and Cynodontia) had evolved by 265 million years ago during the Wordian.

Classical view of therapsid relationships, after Rubidge and Sidor, 2001:

- Sphenacodontia
  - Sphenacodontidae
  - Therapsida
    - Biarmosuchia
    - Eutherapsida
      - Dinocephalia
      - Neotherapsida
        - Anomodontia (incl. Dicynodontia)
        - Theriodontia
          - Gorgonopsia
          - Eutheriodontia
            - Therocephalia
            - Cynodontia (incl. Mammalia)

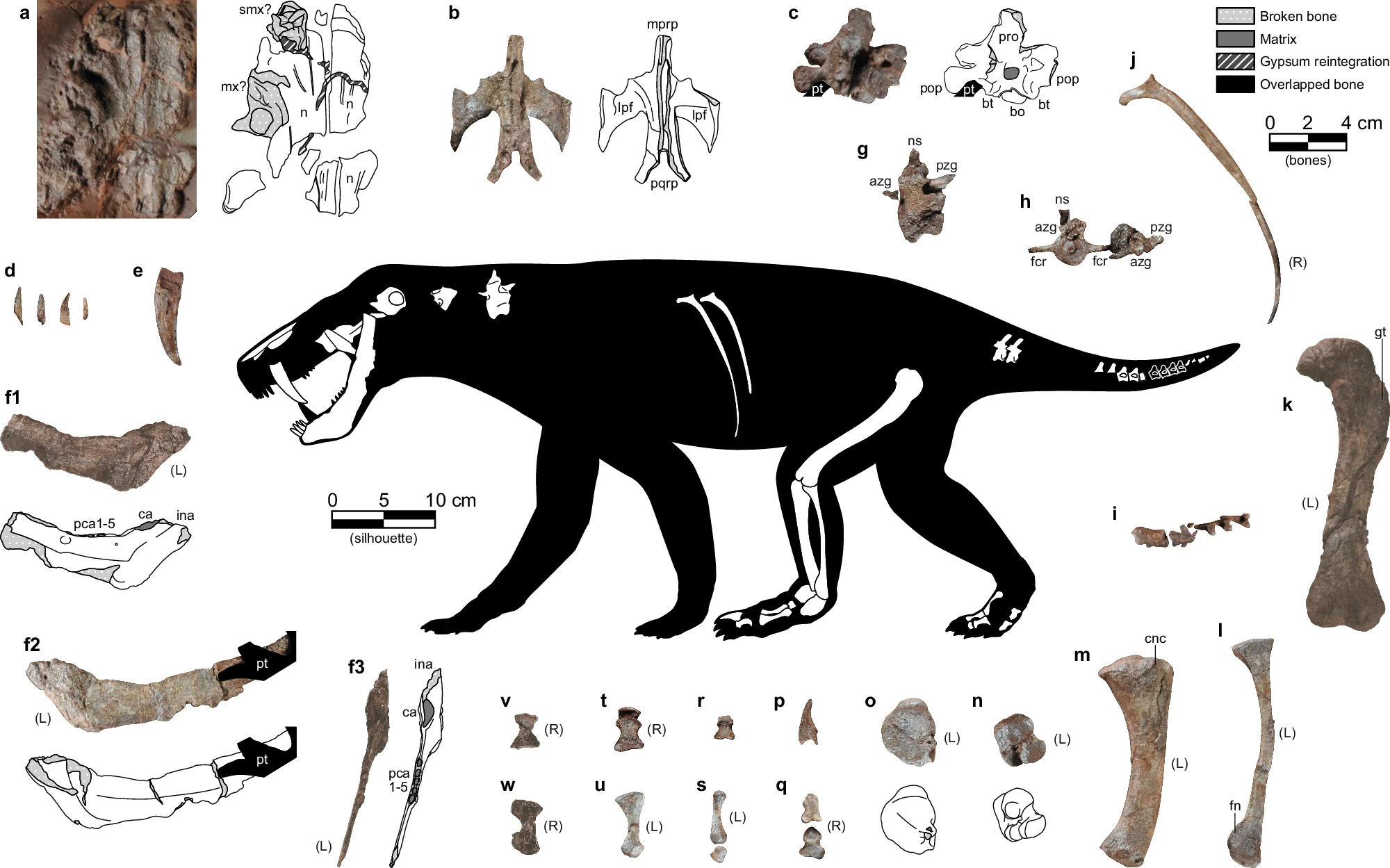
DA21/17-01-01, a gorgonopsian specimen from the Permian Port des Canonge Formation of Mallorca, currently the oldest record of the group

The oldest definitive gorgonopsian fossil worldwide comes from the Port des Canonge Formation of Mallorca in the western Mediterranean. The rocks of this formation are imprecisely dated, however magnetostratigraphy, palynology and ichnology constrain its age to the earliest Wordian at minimum. The stratigraphic position of the gorgonopsian itself and surrounding fossil track record may suggest it is significantly older, potentially Roadian of the early Guadalupian (Middle Permian) or even of the Kungurian or Artinskian stages of the Cisuralian (Early Permian). Such an age would not only make it the oldest gorgonopsian yet known, but the oldest therapsid altogether. Although of indeterminable species, the anatomy of the Mallorcan gorgonopsian suggests it is more derived than the earliest-diverging recognised gorgonopsian, Nochnitsa, and is consistent with a position in or just outside of the base of the "African" and "Russian" clades. This suggests that not only were gorgonopsians present in the earliest Wordian, if not the late Cisuralian, but that their diversification was well underway by this time and that the clade as a whole likely originated before this interval. Furthermore, it suggests that early gorgonopsian (and indeed therapsid) diversity was not restricted to high-latitudes of temperate Pangaea, as previously suggested from literal readings of the fossil record, but also included the low equatorial latitudes of the supercontinent (where Mallorca was located).

The oldest high-latitude gorgonopsians both come from the Karoo Sugergroup of South Africa. The older of the two is a partial snout belonging to a large undeterminable genus from the Eodicynodon Assemblage Zone of the Karoo Basin, roughly dating to the Wordian. Phorcys, known from the lowermost end of Karoo's Tapinocephalus Assemblage Zone (roughly dating a little later to the Wordian/Capitanian boundary), is the oldest identifiable gorgonopsian taxon. Although highly fragmentary, both Karoo taxa are estimated to have had skulls measuring approximately 30 centimetres (12 in) in length, significantly larger than the estimated ~18 centimetres (7.1 in) skull of the Mallorcan gorgonopsian and the slightly younger Eriphostoma. This suggests gorgonopsian body size was also diversifying early in their evolution.

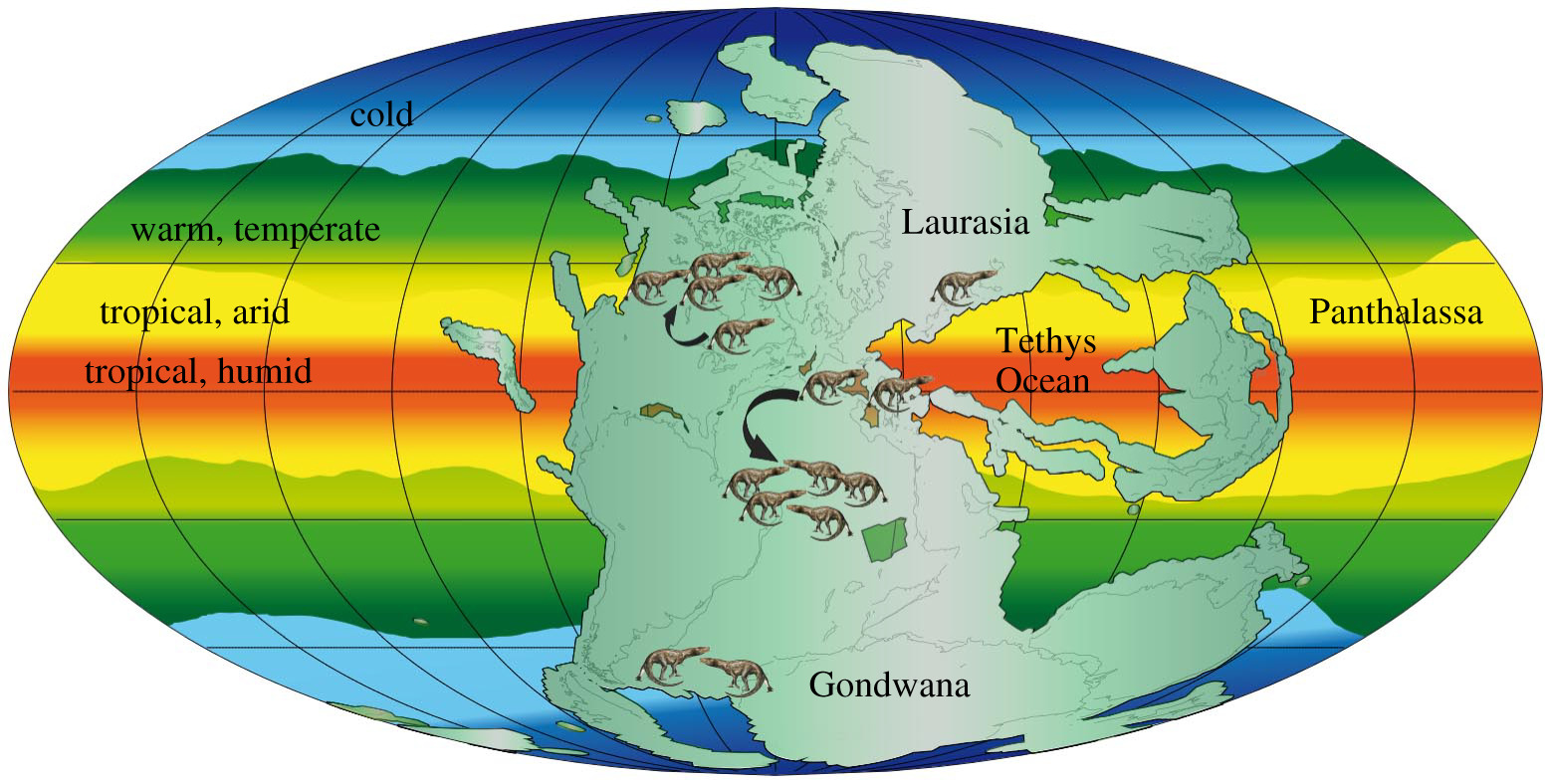
Tetrapod distribution and temperature belts through the Upper Permian and Early Triassic

The Permian progressively became dryer and dryer. In the Upper Carboniferous and Lower Permian, pelycosaurs seem to have clung to the everwet coal swamp habitats near the equator (fossils known within 10° of either side of the palaeoequator); beyond this to about 30° was an expansive desert which extended all the way to the coast, separating the swamps from the temperate regions. By the Middle Permian, the equatorial forests had switched to a seasonal wet/dry system, but the swamps were connected to the temperate zones via coastal passages along East Pangaea, allowing cross-continental migration from what is now South Africa to what is now Russia. Therapsids appear to have evolved in this seasonally humid/dry landscape, expanding even into the temperate zones. At this point, synapsids were the only large terrestrial animals of their environment; and pelycosaurs may not have been able to adapt to the aridification. At about the time of pelycosaur extinction, therapsids experienced a major adaptive radiation (all carnivores) continuing into the Upper Permian.

Throughout the Middle Permian, the often gigantic dinocephalians were the dominant animals of their ecosystems, with basal therocephalians taking over the sabertooth predator niche. Dinocephalians would go extinct during the Capitanian mass extinction event caused by volcanic activity which has formed the Chinese Emeishan Traps. The exact cause of their extinction is unclear, but they were replaced by gorgonopsians and dicynodonts (which began to greatly increase in size) and the smaller therocephalians. It was thought that the extinction of basal therocephalians allowed the diversification of gorgonopsians, with their replacement likely due to gorgonopsians being able to exploit a wider variety of prey. The rubidgines were the most derived gorgonopsians, and consequently the most massive and heavily built.

== Palaeobiology ==
=== Bite ===
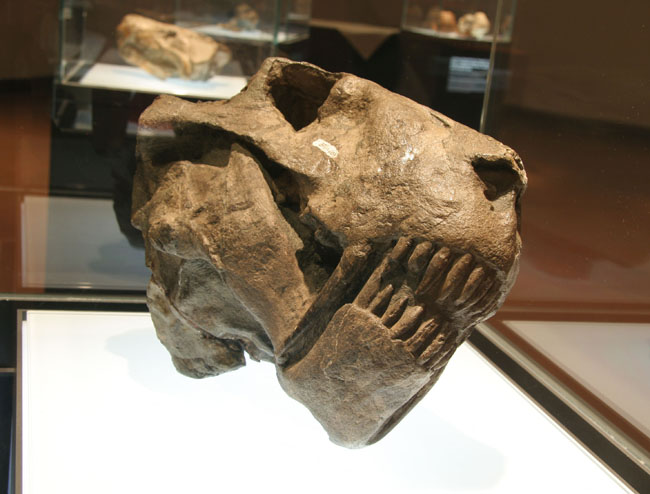
Smilesaurus ferox has the proportionally longest canines of any gorgonopsian.

Gorgonopsians were likely active predators. The rubidgeines have an especially robust skull among gorgonopsians, comparable to those of enormous macropredators which use their skulls as their primary weapon, such as mosasaurs or some theropod dinosaurs. Less robust gorgonopsians with longer canines and much weaker bite, such as Smilesaurus or Inostrancevia, instead probably used their canines for slashing, much more similar to sabre-toothed cats. The postcanines of Clelandina were replaced by a smooth ridge unlike dicynodonts which have a blade-like keratinous ridge, and it may have predominantly gone after prey it could swallow whole. Gorgonopsian taxa did coexist with each other—as many as seven at one time—and the fact that some rubidgeines possess postcanines while some other contemporary ones do not suggests that they practiced niche partitioning and pursued different prey items.

The elongated canines have generally been thought to have been instrumental in their hunting tactics. The gorgonopsian jaw hinge was double jointed and made up of somewhat mobile and rotatable bones, which would have allowed them to open their mouths incredibly wide—perhaps in excess of 90°—without having to unhinge the jaw. It has alternatively been suggested (first in 2002 by biologists Blaire Van Valkenburgh and Tyson Secco, though in reference to cats) that sabres evolved primarily due to sexual selection as a form of mating display. This is exhibited in some modern deer species, but is difficult to test given the lack of living sabre-toothed synapsid predators. In sabre-toothed cats, long-sabred ("dirk-toothed") taxa are thought to have been pursuit hunters, whereas short-toothed ("scimitar-toothed") taxa are thought to have been ambush predators. Among the dirk-toothed cats, these predators are suggested to have killed with a well-placed slash to the throat after grappling prey, but gorgonopsians may have been less precise with bite placement, armed with reptilian jaws and tooth arrangements. Instead, gorgonopsians possibly used a bite-and-retreat tactic: the predator would ambush its quarry and take a sizable and debilitating bite out of it, and then follow as the prey tried to escape before succumbing to its injury, whereupon the gorgonopsian would deliver a killing bite. Because the postcanines are reduced or entirely absent, meat would have been forcibly torn away from the carcass and swallowed whole. This "puncture–pull" strategy is also hypothesised to have been used by theropod dinosaurs.

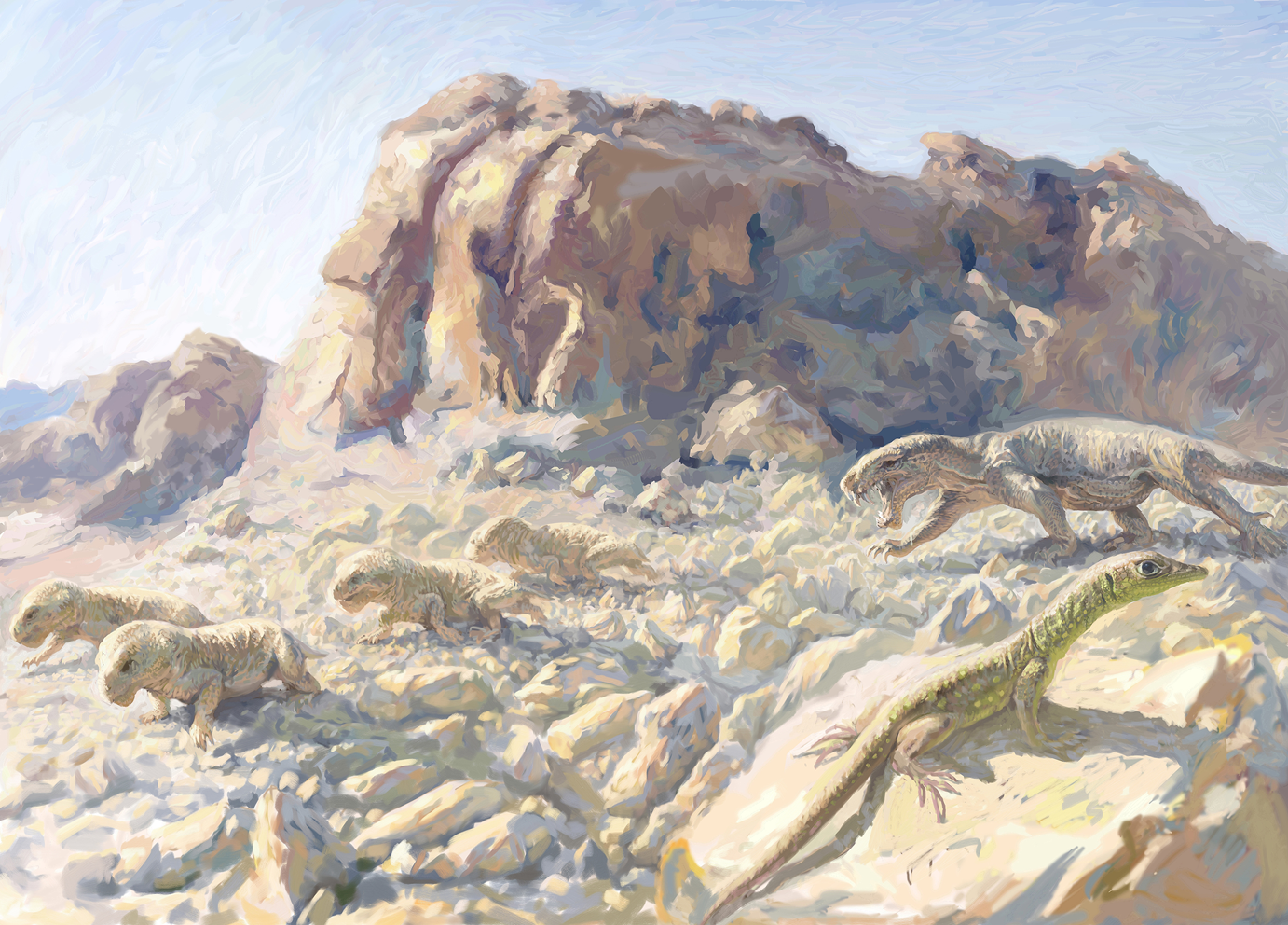
Reconstruction of a gorgonopsian chasing a herd of Endothiodon, based on the Late Permian Tanzanian Usili Formation

Gorgonopsians, along with other early carnivores as well as crocodiles, predominantly relied on "Kinetic-Inertial system" (KI) of biting down onto prey, in which the pterygoid and temporalis muscles rapidly clamped the jaws shut, using momentum and the kinetic energy of the jaws and teeth to grapple the victim. Mammalian carnivores, including sabre-toothed cats, instead rely mainly on the "Static-Pressure system" (SP) where the temporalis and masseter muscles produce a strong bite force to kill prey. The temporalis and masseter had only separated in mammals, and gorgonopsians instead had a muscle stretching from the underside of the skull roof, back to the squamosal bone (at the back of the skull), and across the cheekbones. The part anchored by the cheeks stabilised the jawbone and allowed it to move side-to-side while closing. This may have been very important in biting, as the cheekbones get stronger in tandem with the canines getting longer.

Smaller gorgonopsians, such as Cyonosaurus (which may actually represent a juvenile of a different species), had gracile skulls and sabres, and may have acted much like jackals and foxes. Bigger gorgonopsians, such as Gorgonops, had long robust snouts with strongly flared cheeks, which would have supported strong pterygoids and a powerful KI bite. The medium-size Arctognathus had a box-like skull and resultantly powerful snout, which would have allowed strong bending and torsion movements, and a combination of both KI and SP bite elements. Even bigger gorgonopsians, such as Arctops, had a shorter and more convex snout like the earlier sphenecodont Dimetrodon, and would have been able to rapidly clamp the jaws shut from a wide gape (which would have been necessary given the long canines). The even larger Rubidgeinae had extremely powerful, heavily built, buttressed skulls, with wide snouts, strongly flanged cheeks, and exceedingly long teeth; the sabres of Rubidgea atrox are longer than the teeth of Tyrannosaurus.

Unlike mammalian carnivores, gorgonopsians (and therocephalians) had reduced or completely lacked postcanines, and the jaw likely could not exert shearing pressure necessary for crushing bones open to access the bone marrow. It has largely been unclear if bone marrow had even evolved yet in Permian synapsids (fish and many amphibians lack this in present day), but in 2021 it was shown that the Early Permian amphibians Seymouria and Discosauriscus likely had haematopoietic (red blood cell-producing) bone marrow in their limbs.

=== Locomotion ===
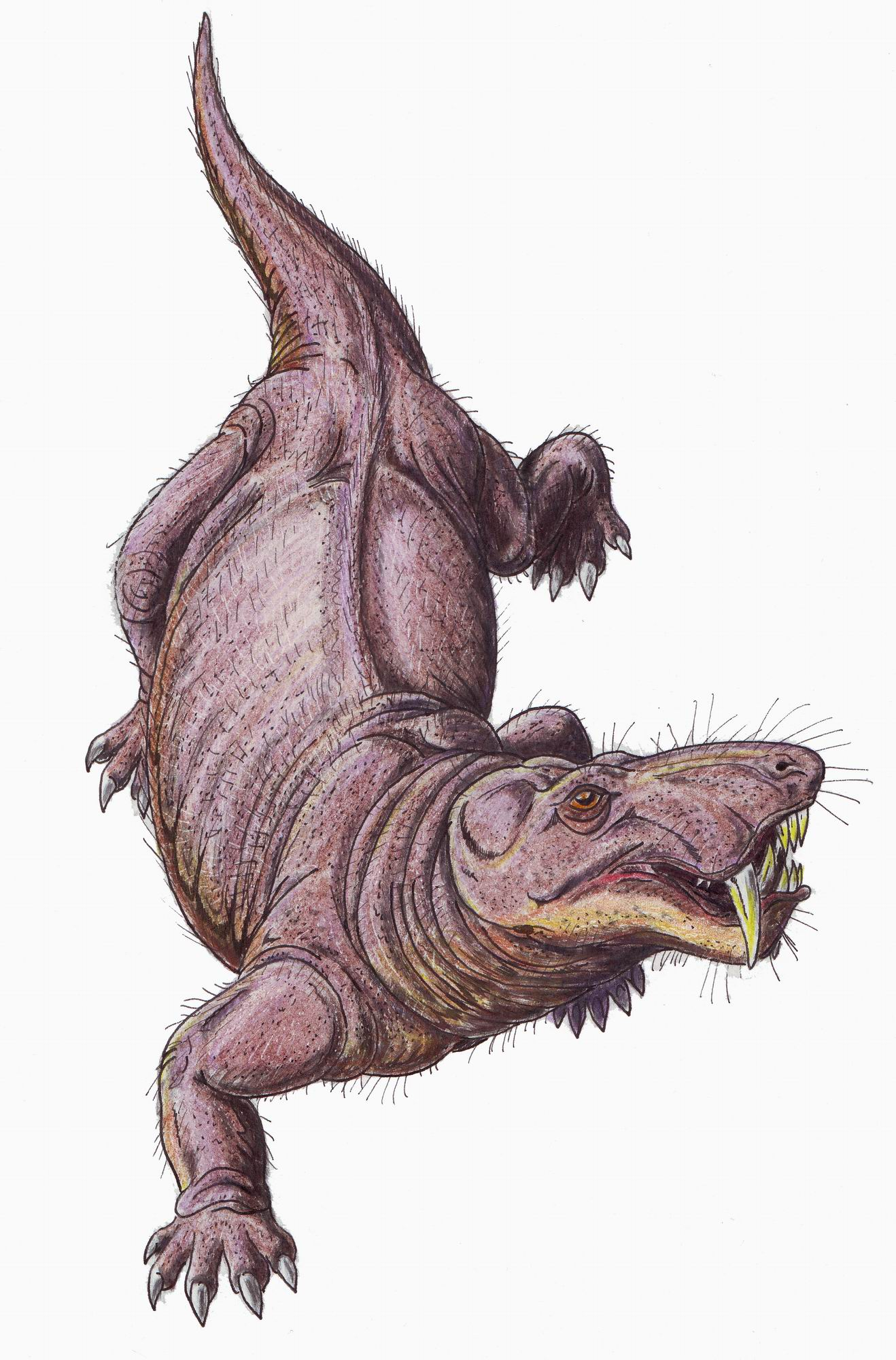
Reconstruction of Rubidgea atrox walking with a sprawling gait

Gorgonopsians are considered to have been strictly terrestrial. They are thought to have been able to move with an erect gait similar to that used by crocodilians, the limbs positioned almost vertically as opposed to horizontally as in the sprawling gait of lizards. The glenoid cavity on the shoulder blade is strongly angled tailwards, so the limbs had limited forward movement, and they may have had a short stride length. Lizards often move their spines side to side to increase stride length, but the more vertically orientated facet joints connecting the vertebrae in gorgonopsians would have made the spine more rigid and stable, encumbering such movement.

The gorgonopsian shoulder joint has a highly unusual configuration. The humeral head which connects to the shoulder is longer than the glenoid, so it could not fit into the cavity. Consequently, they may have been attached with a large mass of cartilage, with the humerus performing a rolling movement over the glenoid. This could theoretically make the angle between the humerus and the glenoid anywhere from 80 to 145° when facing the animal. If the angle was on the lower end, this would have been a rather firm joint, allowing the deltoids to exert great force through the forelimb, such as when pinning down struggling prey, or holding down a carcass while ripping off flesh. If the humerus was positioned at a higher angle, this could have permitted enhanced extension forwards and backwards (along the long axis) and thus greater stride length, useful in an attack or short chases. The shoulder blade expands off to the sides of the animal (protrudes laterally), also providing a large attachment for the deltoids. All the scapulohumeral muscles had strongly developed attachments, particularly the deltoids. When extending the forelimbs, the deltoids may have raised the front side (anterior margin) of the humerus, and coracobrachialis muscle lowered the back side (posterior margin). When retracting the forelimb, the pectoralis muscle may have pushed the anterior margin down, and the subscapularis muscle pulled the posterior margin up.

The pelvis joint has the usual ball-and-socket joint configuration. The somewhat flattened femoral head could theoretically have fit into the hip socket at a wide range of angles. In 1982, palaeontologist Tom S. Kemp suggested that early theriodonts, including gorgonopsians, could place the femur at both a horizontal angle in a sprawling gait, as well as a more vertical angle in an erect gait. He compared the locomotory habits of these creatures to those of crocodilians, which utilise a sprawling gait over short distances, but switch to an erect one while running or moving over longer distances. Though the hip of the specimen then numbered as GPIT/RE/7113 seems to be anatomically intermediate between Dimetrodon and mammals—with the ilium expanded more in the headwards direction than the tailwards, and the pubis somewhat reduced—the puboischiofemoralis muscle (a large muscle carried only by reptiles which runs from the pelvis to the femur) extensively attached to the underside of the pubis and ischium, which would have allowed it to produce a strong adducting force (drawing the legs closer to the body), useful in a sprawling gait. It is also conceivable that gorgonopsians primarily engaged this muscle while grappling struggling prey. The shins are relatively short compared to the femur, which suggests gorgonopsians were not well adapted for running long distances.

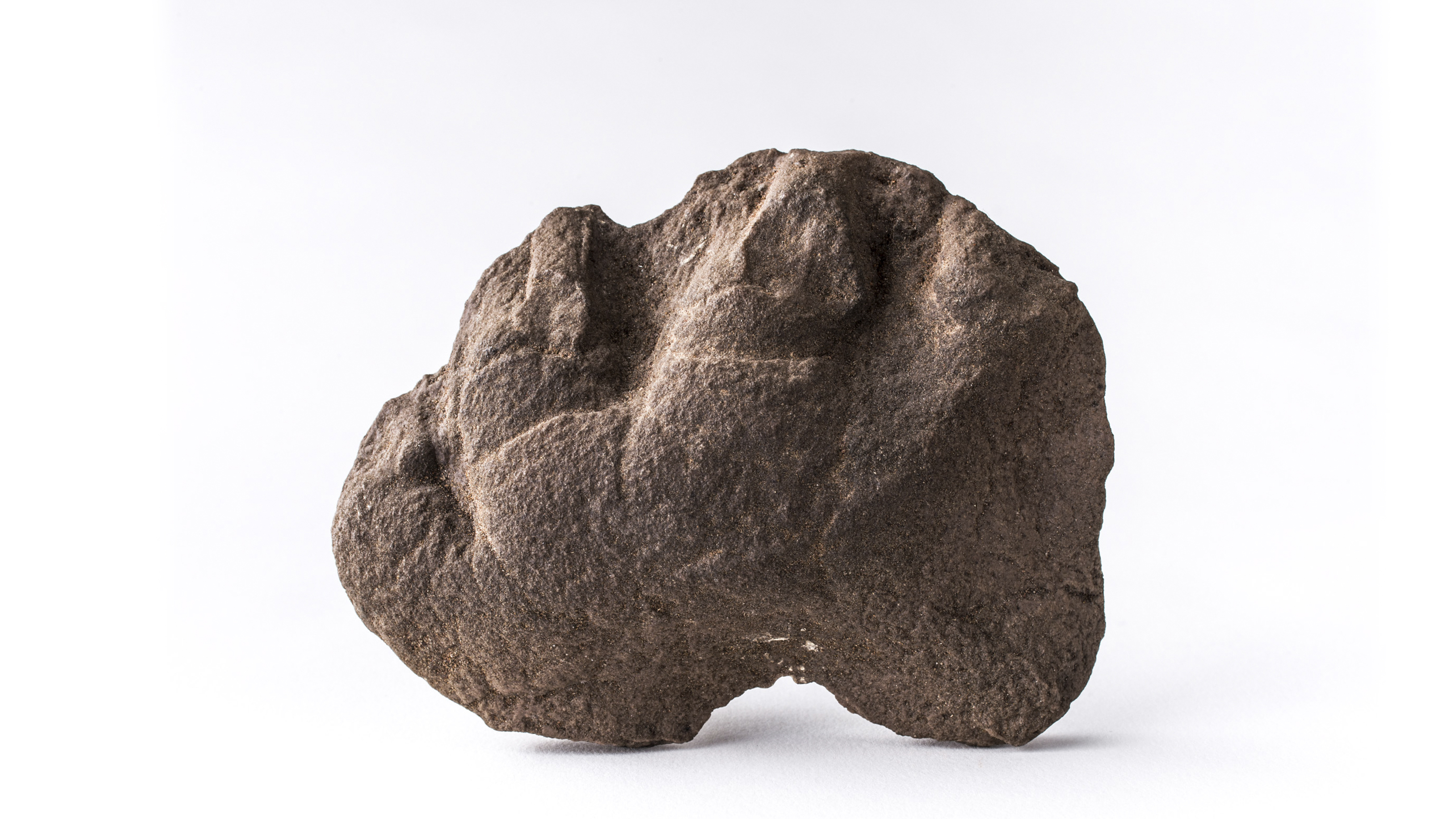
Gorgonopsian footprint

In regard to how the feet were placed on the ground, gorgonopsians are the only early therapsids which present ectataxony (the last digit bears the most weight), homopody (footprints and handprints look the same), and semi-plantigrady (to some degree, the feet were placed flat on the ground). These adaptations may have made gorgonopsians swifter and more agile than their prey. Gorgonopsians had rather nimble digits, indicative of grasping capability for both the hands and feet, possibly for grappling struggling prey to prevent excessive load bearing on, and consequential fracturing or breaking of, the canines while they were sunk into the victim.

=== Senses ===
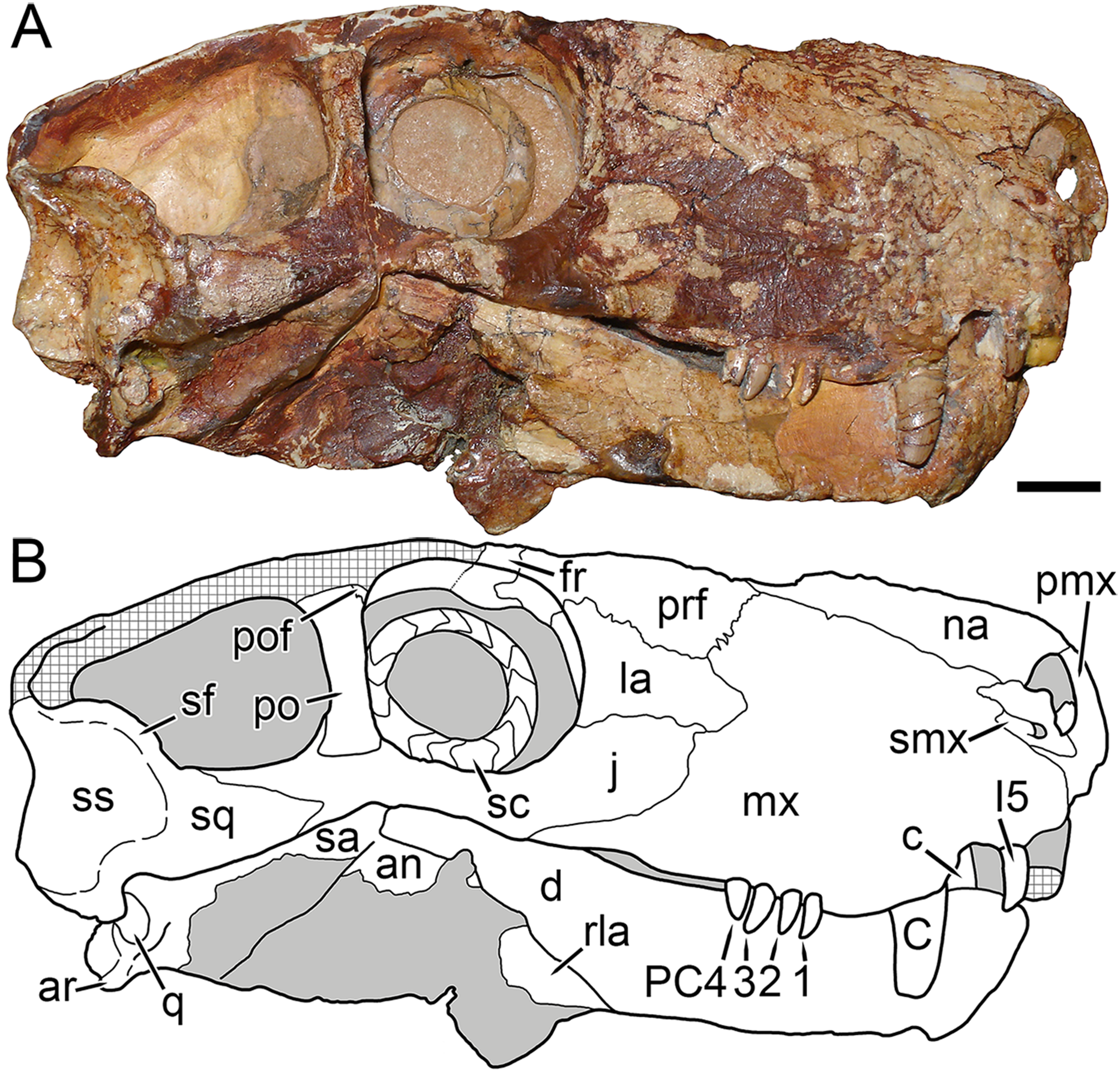
The skull of Viatkogorgon with proportionally large scleral rings

Unlike eutheriodonts, but like some ectothermic creatures today, all gorgonopsians possessed a pineal eye on the top of the head, which is used to detect daylight (and thus, the optimal temperature to be active). It is possible that other theriodonts lost this due to the evolution of either endothermy, intrinsically photosensitive retinal ganglion cells in the eyes—in tandem with the loss of colour vision and a shift to nocturnal life—or both. Nocturnal behaviour has long been assumed to have originated in mammals (nocturnal bottleneck), but the large orbit size and presence of scleral rings in many early synapsids, stretching as far back as the Carboniferous, would suggest that the ability to venture out in low-light conditions evolved much earlier. Based on these aspects, the specimen SAM-PK-K10034 may have had mesopic vision, and Cyonosaurus scotopic or photopic vision. The diameters of the scleral rings for the small Viatkogorgon are proportionally large, with an inner diameter of 1.5 cm (0.6 in) and outer diameter of 2.3 cm (0.9 in), compared to a diameter of 2.8 cm (1.1 in) for the orbit itself, which suggests it made predominantly nocturnal excursions. Among gorgonopsians, the rubidgeine Clelandina has unusually small scleral rings, indicating it had photopic vision and was strictly diurnal; Kammerer suggested that niche partitioning among rubidgeines (as there have been as many as seven different taxa coexisting in an area), in part, took the form of different species being active at different times of the day, but the scleral rings of only Clelandina among this subfamily have been identified, making this hypothesis highly speculative.

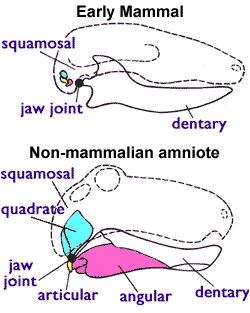
Early mammal (above) vs. pelycosaur (below) jaw configuration with relevance to hearing

Gorgonopsians have a rather short nasal cavity, like pelycosaurs, but it features abundant longitudinal ridges behind the internal nostrils (which connect the nasal cavity to the throat); because respired air would not have passed through them, these are typically interpreted as having been olfactory turbinates, and would have given gorgonopsians a rather highly developed sense of smell. Gorgonopsians possessed a vomeronasal organ ("Jacobson's organ")—a part of the accessory olfactory system—which would have been placed at the base of the nasal septum; unlike dicynodonts and therocephalians, there seems to have been a canal connecting the organ with the mouth, indicating it was functional in gorgonopsians.

Early theriodonts (including gorgonopsians) may have possessed an eardrum, unlike earlier pelycosaurs, indicated by the reduction of the connection between the quadrate bone (at the jaw hinge) and the pterygoid bone (at the palate), allowing the quadrate to independently vibrate to a degree. This may have allowed the detection of air-borne sounds with a low amplitude of less than 1 mm (0.039 in), but the eardrum would have been supported by cartilage or ligaments instead of bone. If correct, then the postdentary bones (which in early mammals form the middle ear bones) would have needed to become detached from the dentary (jawbone); the gorgonopsian fossil record seems to indicate the postdentary-dentary connection was reduced. Though, given the specialisations required for biting, the condition of an isolating quadrate in gorgonopsians could alternatively be explained as streptostyly (rotatable quadrate) in order to widen the gape rather than facilitate hearing.

=== Thermoregulation ===
A major anatomical shift occurred between earlier pelycosaurs and therapsids, which is postulated to have been related to an increasing metabolism and the origins of homeothermy (maintenance of a high body temperature). The evolution of a secondary palate, and the separation of the mouth from the nasal cavity, may have increased ventilation efficiency associated with high levels of aerobic activity; gorgonopsians did not have a bony secondary palate, but possibly had one of soft tissue. Nonetheless, the secondary palate could have instead aided in eating large quantities of food at once rather than in ventilation. The reorganisation of the skeleton (from a sprawling to a parasagittal gait) has been postulated to be indicative of the presence of a diaphragm, and thus also enhanced ventilation for aerobic activity; but it could have instead been to increase acceleration or agility, which does not necessarily equate to intense aerobic activity, much like in crocodiles. Fibrous lamellar cortical bone, which all early therapsids had, would indicate an increased growth rate, but this may not be linked to metabolic rate.

Modern large reptiles naturally give off body heat at a slower rate than smaller ones, and are considered "inertial homeotherms", but they maintain a low body temperature of 25–30 °C (77–86 °F). If therapsids required a higher body temperature of 35–40 °C (95–104 °F), they would either have needed to have been endotherms (generating their own body heat) or have had greater control over heat loss (that is, better homeothermy). The parasagittal gait may have aided the latter, as it would have kept most of the body off the ground as well as allowed blood to stay in the abdomen instead of having to circulate through the appendages, both of which would reduce heat transfer to the ground and stabilise core temperature. The reduced tail would have also reduced the total surface area of the animal, further minimising heat loss. Among therapsids, only eutheriodonts (not gorgonopsians) have respiratory nasal turbinates, which help retain moisture while breathing in large quantities of air, and its evolution is typically associated with the beginning of "mammalian" oxygen consumption rates and the origins of endothermy.

If gorgonopsians were inertial homeotherms, it is not impossible that they had hair. The snout is typically riddled with foramina (small holes which confer with blood vessels), which could potentially point to the existence of loose skin (as opposed to scales), hair, various skin glands (such as sweat glands), and whiskers; however, some reptiles present a similar patterning of foramina, which are instead related to dental development rather than skin. Analysis on inner ear biomechanics found that gorgonopsians probably had a body temperature 23.7–28.6 °C (74.7–83.5 °F), suggesting the clade was ectothermic.

=== Palaeopathology ===
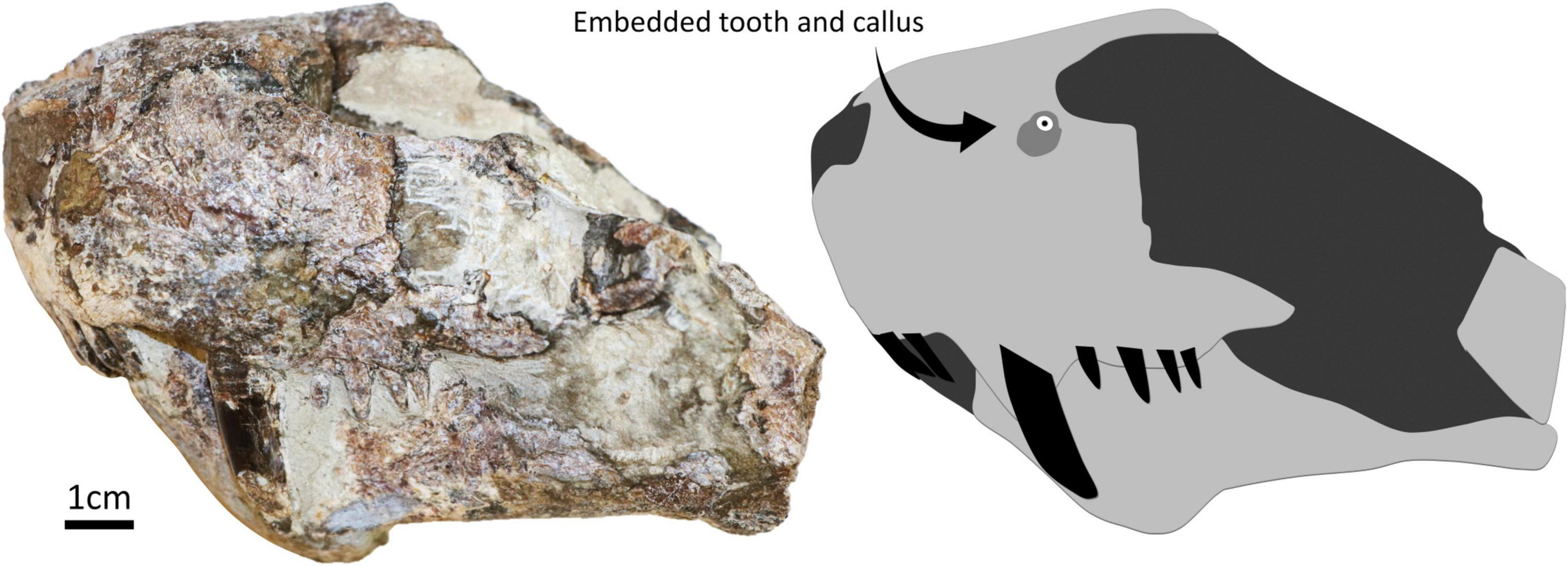
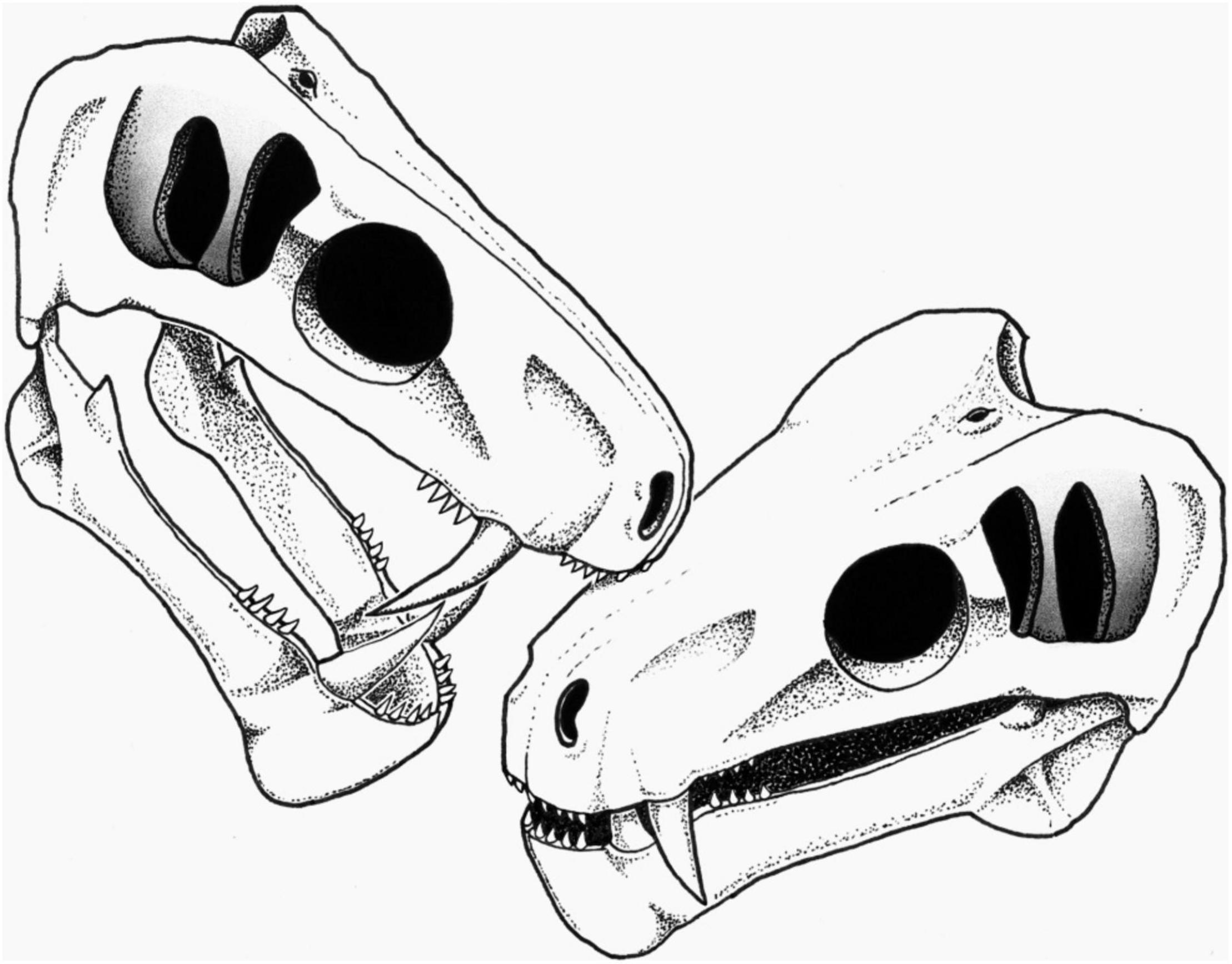
SAM-PK-11490 with an imbedded tooth wound (above), and speculative reconstruction of gorgonopsian social biting (below)

The anterolateral aspect of the left radius (a forearm bone) of the gorgonopsian specimen NHCC LB396 presents a circular bony lesion, featuring irregular-to-radial spikes made of cortical bone surrounded by a thin layer of subperiosteal bone, which grew rapidly over a single growing season. This is consistent with periostitis most likely stemming from subperiosteal haematoma. This specific condition as well as the fast growth rate are more reminiscent of mammals and dinosaurs than crocodilians or monitor lizards. Among early synapsids, the only other pathology noted is osteomyelitis in several pelycosaur groups.

The labial (lip/cheek) side of the tooth root of a functional canine of RB382 presents as many as 8 lesions, clustering along the midline of the tooth, which resemble miniature teeth with a pulp, dentine, and a thin enamel coating. They are roughly circular—with diameters varying from 0.3–3.9 mm (0.012–0.154 in)—though they become less circular at around the middle point of the root until passing the cervix of the tooth. This is roughly consistent with the human ailment odontoma, the most frequent type of odontogenic tumour, which previously only extended a few million years back in the fossil record. At 255 million years old, RB382 presents the oldest-known case of odontoma.

The adult snout SAM-PK-11490 from an indeterminate Middle Permian gorgonopsian species has an imbedded tooth from an unidentifiable animal. The bone developed a callus around the tooth, indicating it healed and the individual survived the attack. It either came from a predator—namely a biarmosuchian, a therocephalian, or another gorgonopsian—or intraspecific face biting as is commonly exhibited in social predators—such as big cats or monitor lizards, and it has been suggested for several extinct lineages such as theropods, aquatic reptiles, and saber-toothed cats. Social biting is intended to assert dominance or facilitate breeding, and, if correct, suggests at least some Middle Permian gorgonopsians were social carnivores. The tooth was initially overlooked so it is unclear how common this pathology actually is.

== Palaeoecology ==
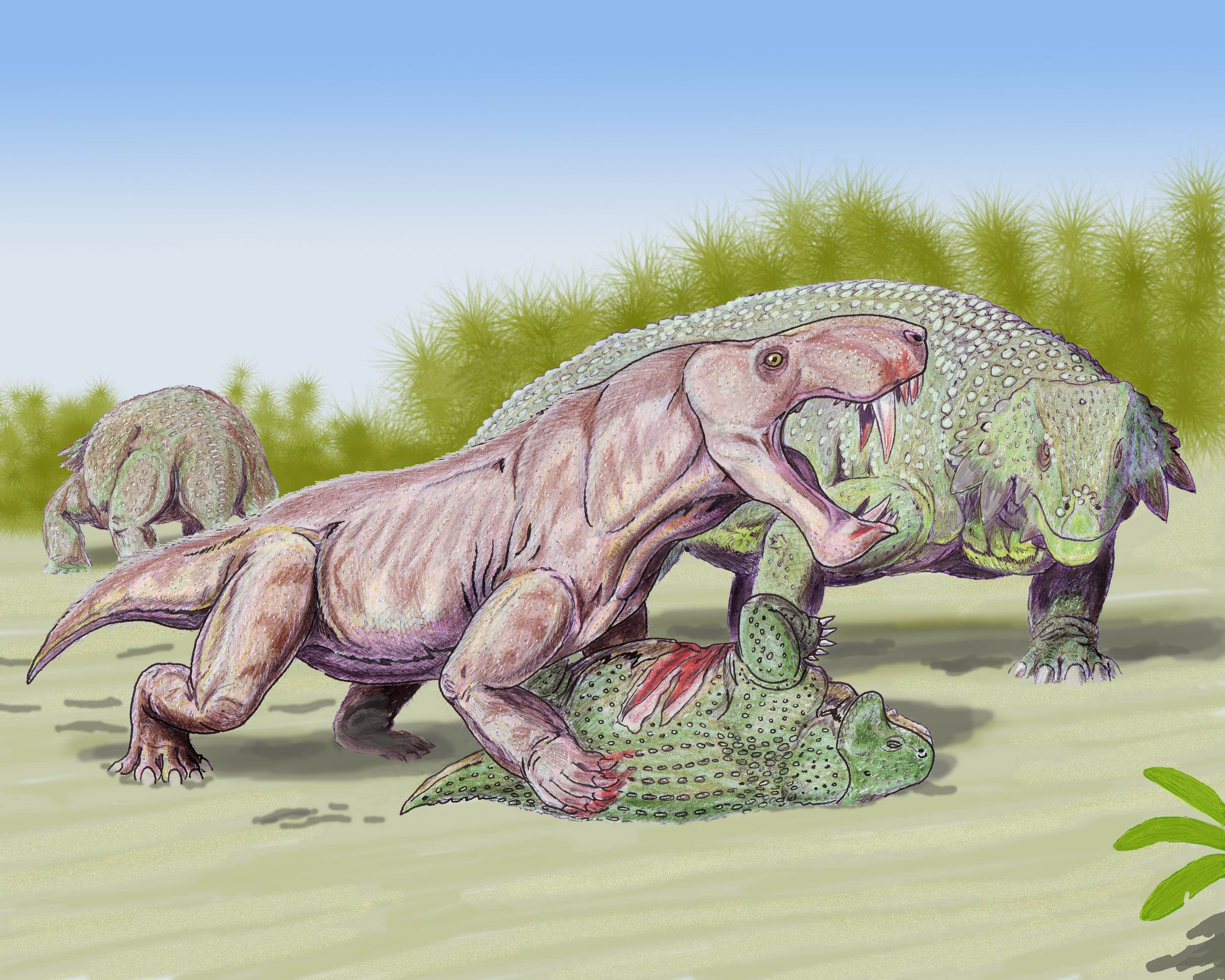
Inostrancevia hunting Scutosaurus

Following the extinction of the dinocephalians and (in South Africa) the basal therocephalians Scylacosauridae and Lycosuchidae, gorgonopsians evolved from small and uncommon forms into large apex predators. (Note: The publication in 2022 of the official description of the genus Phorcys and a similar indeterminate specimen shows that some gorgonopsians were already larger in size during the Middle Permian, without, however, reaching similar sizes to Inostrancevia or the rubidgeines. However, large gorgonopsians such as Phorcys and other large therapsids may have left the niche partitioning to smaller representatives after the Capitanian extinction.) Through the Middle to Upper Permian, in South Africa the dicynodonts were the most common animals, whereas the pareiasaurs Deltavjatia and Scutosaurus were the most abundant in the gorgonopsian-bearing Russian formations. During the Upper Permian, the South African Beaufort Group was a semi-arid cold steppe featuring large, seasonal (ephemeral) rivers and floodplains draining water sources much farther north into the Karoo Sea, with some occurrences of flash floods after sudden, heavy rainfall; the distribution of carbonates is consistent with present-day caliche deposits which form in climates with an average temperature of 16–20 °C (61–68 °F) and 100–500 mm (3.9–19.7 in) of seasonal rainfall. The gorgonopsian-bearing Salarevskian Formation in western Russia was also probably deposited in a semi-arid environment with highly seasonal rainfall, and featured hygrophyte and halophyte plants in coastal areas, as well as more drought-resistant conifers at higher elevations. The Moradi Formation was an arid desert, primarily dominated by the captorhinid reptile Moradisaurus and the pareiasaur Bunostegos. It featured voltzian conifers, and has environmentally been compared to the interior Namib Desert or the Lake Eyre basin.

== Extinction ==
Just before the Permian–Triassic extinction event, gorgonopsians began to go extinct in Africa and Eastern Europe. In Eastern Europe, gorgonopsians went extinct due their inability to adapt to changes in temperature and humidity. Following their extinction the macropredator niches were taken over by large therocephalians and archosauriform reptiles taking over macropredatory niches. In Africa, the Daptocephalus Assemblage Zone saw a reduction in gorgonopsian diversity, with only two genera being present in the upper subzone. Majority of the large-bodied rubidgeines died out early Daptocephalus Assemblage Zone. Rubidgea, the last rubidgeine, went extinct during a turnover event that separates the lower and upper subzones being replaced by Inostrancevia. The gorgonopsians in the upper subzone consisted of Arctognathus, Inostrancevia, and Cyonosaurus in the upper Daptocephalus AZ, with the latter two being the geographically the youngest known gorgonopsians. Both taxa went extinct during the PTEM, which was primarily caused by volcanism which formed the Siberian Traps. The resultant massive spike in greenhouse gases caused rapid aridification due to: temperature spike (as much as 8–10 °C at the equator, with average equatorial temperatures of 32–35 °C, or 90–95 °F, at the beginning of the Triassic), acid rain (with pH as low as 2 or 3 during eruption and 4 globally, and the subsequent dearth of forests for the first 10 million years of the Triassic), frequent wildfires (though they were already rather common throughout the Permian), and potential breakdown of the ozone layer (possibly briefly increasing UV radiation bombardment by 400% at the equator and 5000% at the poles). Initially, it was thought Cyonosaurus survived into the Early Triassic, but later analysis found it to have been erroneous. Despite this, it is the youngest occurrence of gorgonopsians within the Karoo Basin, suggesting it was more resilient to the early phases of the mass extinction.

Ostehistological analysis on gorgonopsians found they reached reproductive maturity later than Early Triassic therapsids, making them more vulnerable to the environmental changes during the PTME. Following the extinction, Moschorhinus would ecologically replace gorgonopsians and was the largest predator in the Karoo Basin prior to the arrival of archosauriforms. The large predatory niches gorgonopsians left open were eventually filled by the archosaurs (including crocodiles and dinosaurs) during the early stages of the Triassic.

== See also ==
- Evolution of mammals
- Therocephalia
