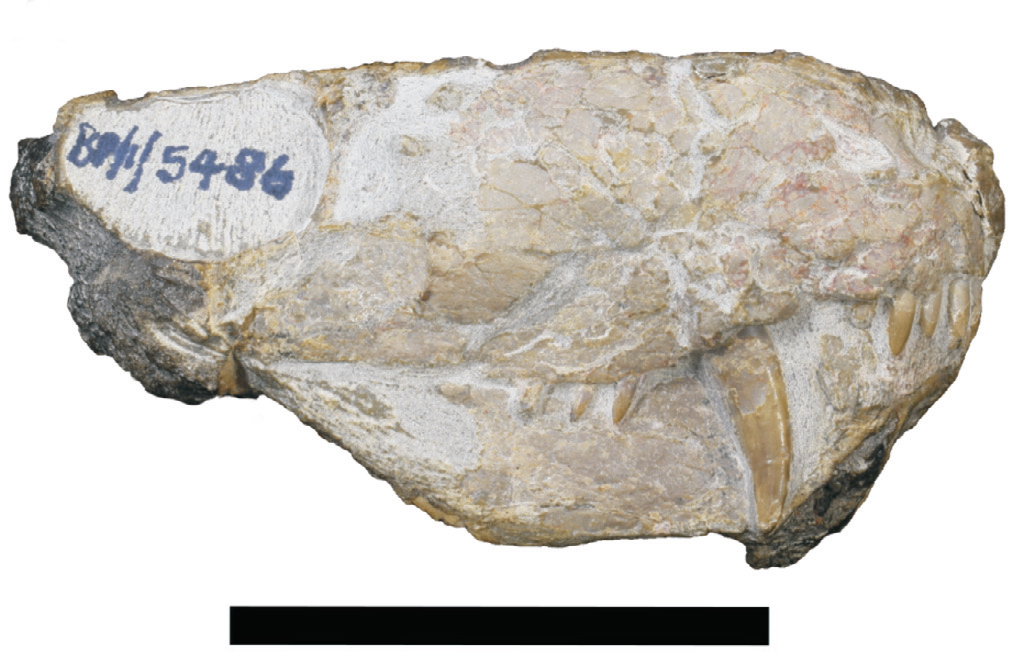
- Skull

Scientific classification
- Kingdom: Animalia
- Phylum: Chordata
- Clade: Synapsida
- Clade: Therapsida
- Clade: †Gorgonopsia
- Genus: †Eriphostoma; Broom, 1911

Type species
- †Eriphostoma microdon Broom, 1911

Synonyms
- Eoarctops vanderbyli Haughton, 1929; Galesuchus gracilis Haughton, 1915; Scylacognathus parvus Haughton, 1913

= Eriphostoma =

Eriphostoma Temporal range: Middle to Late Permian (Capitanian to Wuchiapingian) c. 261–258 Ma

Extinct genus of therapsids

Eriphostoma is an extinct genus of gorgonopsian therapsids known from the Middle to Late Permian of South Africa. It has one known species, Eriphostoma microdon, and was first named by Robert Broom in 1911. It is one the oldest known gorgonopsian and among the smallest and most basal members of the clade.

== History ==
Eriphostoma was named in 1911 by Robert Broom, based on a poorly preserved specimen collected by the Reverend J. H. Whaits in the town of Fraserburg Road (now Leeu-Gamka), South Africa. The holotype was accessioned in the American Museum of Natural History with the specimen number AMNH FARB 5524. It was the first named gorgonopsian from the Tapinocephalus Assemblage Zone of the Beaufort Group. Despite its status as one of the oldest known gorgonopsians, its poor preservation meant that the specimen was largely ignored for the rest of the 20th century, and typically regarded as a nomen dubium. A 1989 comprehensive revision of gorgonopsians only briefly mentioned it as an indeterminate theriodont.

However, in 2014, CT scanning of the holotype allowed its redescription as a valid species of gorgonopsian. Further study, and the discovery of new specimens, allowed most gorgonopsians from the Tapinocephalus AZ to be synonymized. The species Eriphostoma microdon, Scylacognathus parvus, Galesuchus gracilis, and Eoarctops vanderbyli were synonymized, and Eriphostoma microdon became the valid name due to the Principle of Priority. A fifth species of Tapinocephalus AZ gorgonopsian, Broomisaurus planiceps, is probably also synonymous, but it is currently a nomen dubium due to its poor state of preparation.

== Description ==
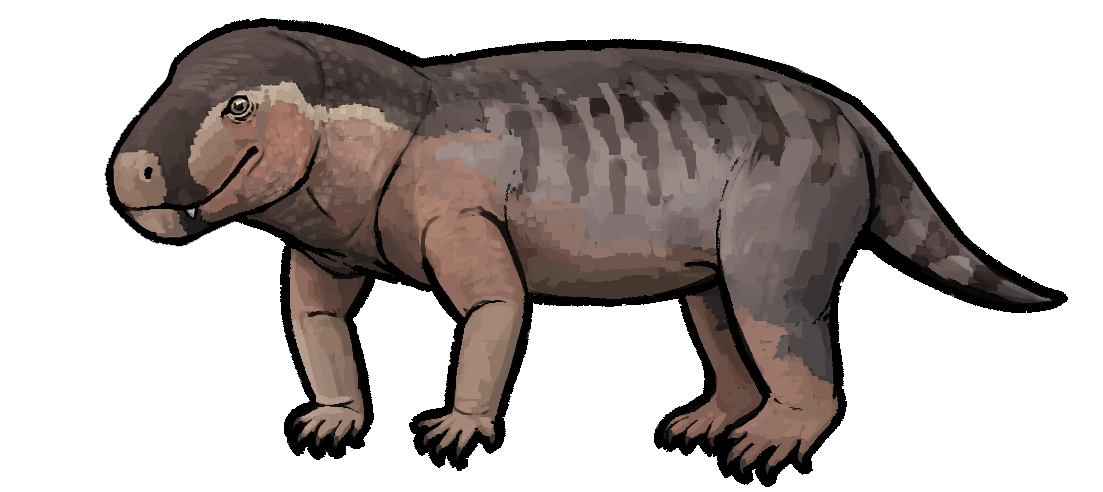
Life restoration

Gorgonopsians were a morphologically conservative group, and like all gorgonopsians, Eriphostoma would have been a quadrupedal predator. It was among the smaller members of the group, with a skull less than 15 centimetres (5.9 in) long. It had a relatively short, deep snout and large orbits compared to other gorgonopsians. Like all gorgonopsians, it had five incisors and a canine tooth on each side of the upper jaw, but it had only three small postcanine teeth in its maxilla. The palate of Eriphostoma has delta-shaped palatine bosses covered in numerous teeth, like Gorgonops and many basal therapsids, but not more derived gorgonopsians which tend to have ridge-like palatine bosses with few teeth.

== Classification ==
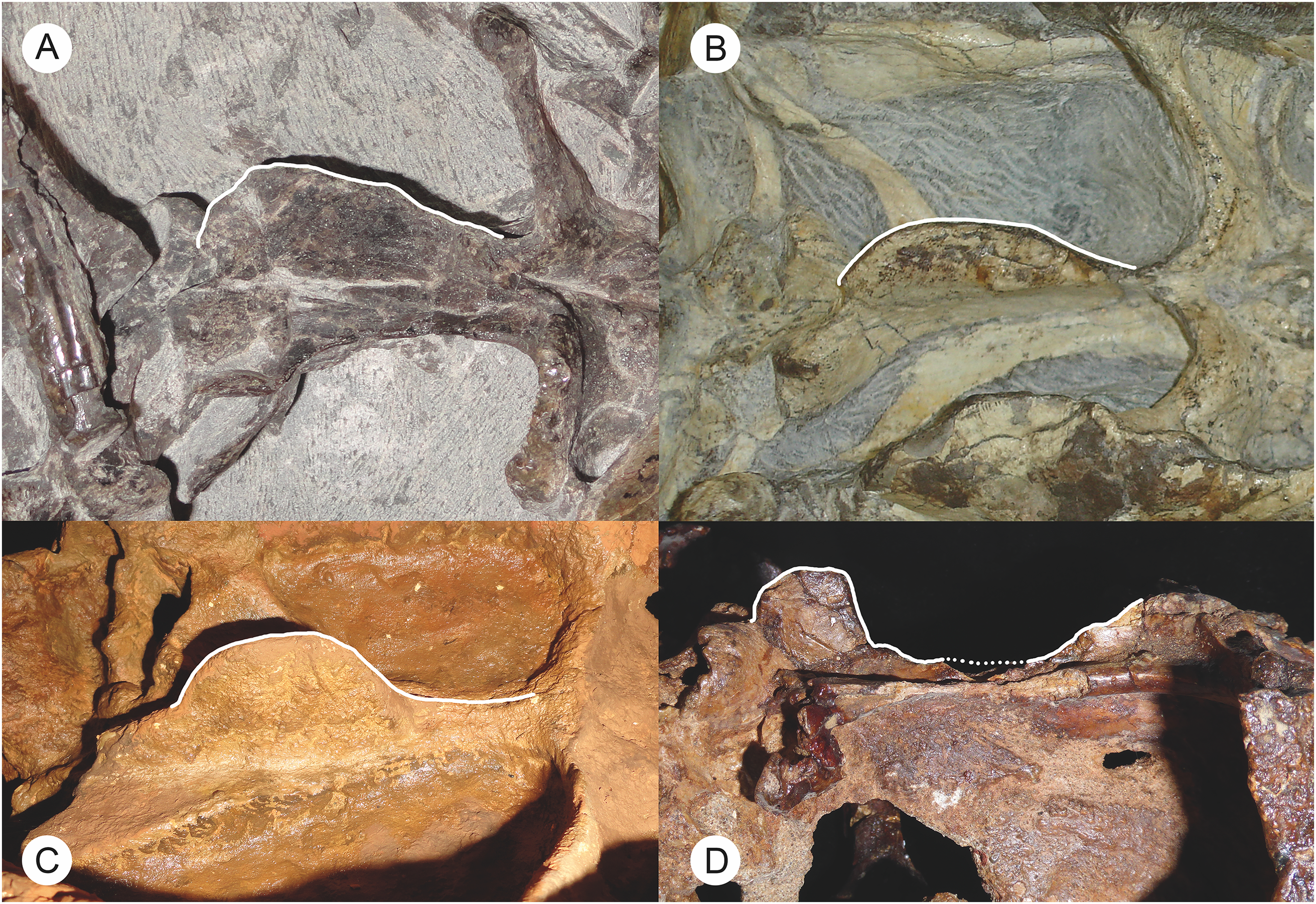
Basicranial girder in Russian and African gorgonopsians; (A) is Eriphostoma

Eriphostoma is one of the most basal member of an endemic African radiation of gorgonopsians.

- Gorgonopsia
  - Nochnitsa
  - - Viatkogorgon
    - - "Russian clade"
        - Suchogorgon
        - - Sauroctonus
          - - Pravoslavlevia
            - Inostrancevia
      - "African clade"
        - Phorcys
        - Eriphostoma
        - Gorgonops
        - - Cynariops
          - - Lycaenops
            - - Smilesaurus
              - Arctops
            - - Arctognathus
              - Rubidgeinae

== Palaeoenvironment ==
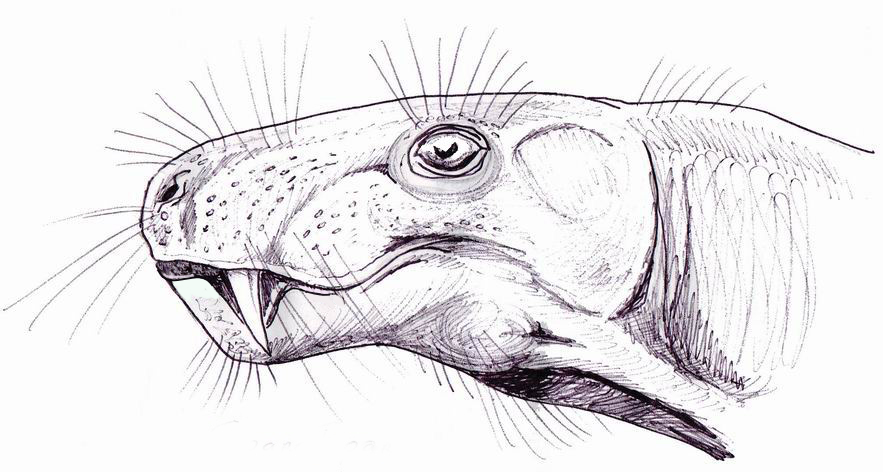
Restoration of the head

All known specimens of Eriphostoma are from the Beaufort Group of South Africa. The holotype is from the Abrahamskraal Formation, but some of the referred specimens are from the overlying Teekloof Formation. Biostratigraphically, it ranges from the upper Tapinocephalus Assemblage Zone to the upper Pristerognathus Assemblage Zone, and is the oldest known gorgonopsian.
