= Wangwusaurus =

Wangwusaurus Temporal range: Late Permian 255 Ma

Scientific classification
- Kingdom: Animalia
- Phylum: Chordata
- Clade: Synapsida
- Clade: Therapsida
- Clade: †Gorgonopsia (?)
- Genus: †Wangwusaurus; Zhongjian, 1979
- Species: †W. tayuensis

Binomial name
- †Wangwusaurus tayuensis Zhongjian, 1979

Extinct genus of dubious therapsids

Wangwusaurus is an extinct genus of probable gorgonipsid therapsid that lived in the Late Permian in present-day China. Only one species is known, Wangwusaurus tayuensis, described by the paleontologist Yang Zhongjian in 1979 from seventeen teeth found in the Jiyuan formation, of which at least seven are recognized as not belonging to those of therapsids.

== Description ==
One of the teeth found also has characteristics similar to those of gorgonopsians, which led the Chinese paleontologist Yang Zhongjian to classify it as the first member of this group to have lived outside of Russia and Africa, places where they are officially recognized. However, three years later, in 1981, paleontologists Denise Sigogneau-Russell and Ai-Lin Sun found the assigned material to be a random assemblage of which only two have even a remote similarity to gorgonopsians, making its classification uncertain.

== See also ==
- List of therapsids
