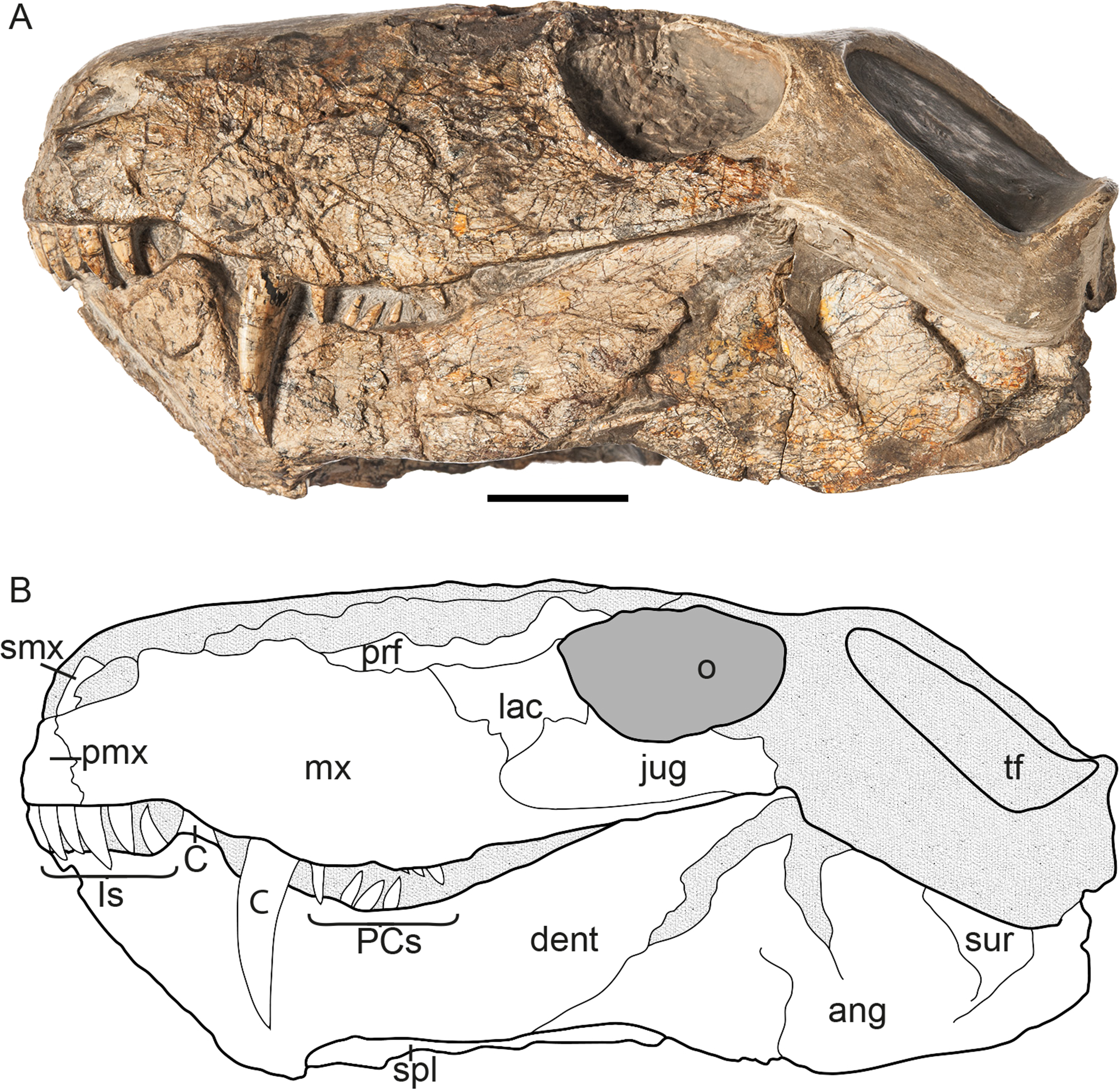
- Skull MB.R.999

Scientific classification
- Kingdom: Animalia
- Phylum: Chordata
- Clade: Synapsida
- Clade: Therapsida
- Clade: †Gorgonopsia
- Genus: †Cynariops; Broom, 1925
- Species: †C. robustus

Binomial name
- †Cynariops robustus Broom, 1925

= Cynariops =

Cynariops Temporal range: Late Permian (Wuchiapingian) c. 258–256 Ma

Genus of gorgonopsians

Cynariops is an extinct genus of gorgonopsian that lived in what is now South Africa during the Permian. The holotype skull specimen BMNH R5743 was made the basis of the new genus and species Cynariops robustus by Robert Broom in 1925, but the genus was later synonymised with other genera such as Scylacognathus. Specimen MB.R.999 was catalogued as a specimen of Aelurognathus at the Museum für Naturkunde, Berlin, until it was further prepared and described in 2018, and the genus Cynariops resurrected.

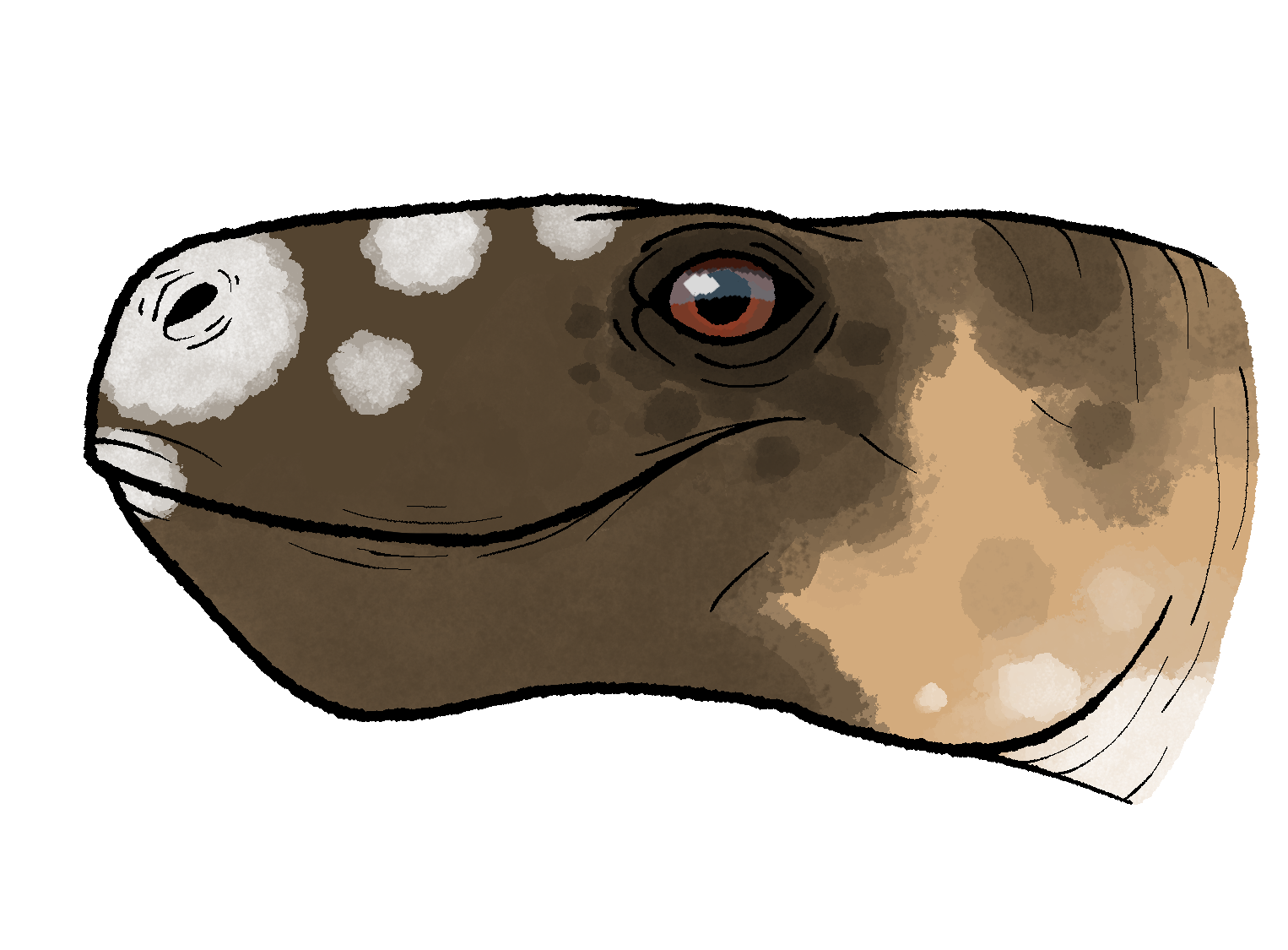
Life restoration
