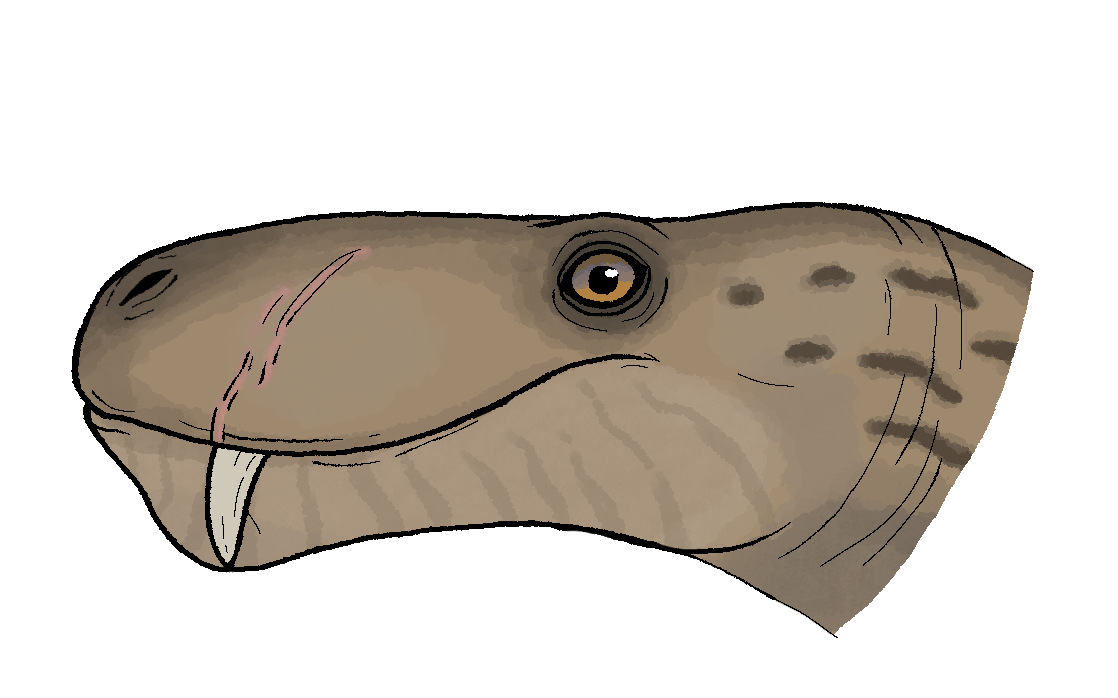
- Life restoration

Scientific classification
- Kingdom: Animalia
- Phylum: Chordata
- Clade: Synapsida
- Clade: Therapsida
- Clade: †Gorgonopsia
- Family: †Phorcyidae
- Genus: †Jirahgorgon; Macungo et al., 2026
- Species: †J. ceto

Binomial name
- †Jirahgorgon ceto Macungo et al., 2026

= Jirahgorgon =

Jirahgorgon Temporal range: Middle Permian, Wordian–Capitanian boundary

Extinct genus of therapsid

Jirahgorgon is an extinct genus of gorgonopsian therapsid (mammal-line synapsid) known from the Permian (Wordian–Capitanian age) Abrahamskraal Formation (Tapinocephalus Assemblage Zone) of South Africa. The genus contains a single species, Jirahgorgon ceto, known from a complete skull articulated with the lower jaw.

== Discovery and naming ==
Jirahgorgon type locality in Laingsburg, South Africa

The Jirahgorgon fossil material was discovered by Julien Benoit, with assistance from Michael O. Day, in March 2019 in outcrops of the middle Abrahamskraal Formation (Grootfontein Member), representing part of the Tapinocephalus Assemblage Zone. These outcrops are situated on the Wilgerbos farm in the town of Laingsburg in the Western Cape of South Africa. The specimen is housed in the Evolutionary Studies Institute (formerly the Bernard Price Institute for Palaeontological Research), part of the University of the Witwatersrand, where it is permanently accessioned as specimen BP/1/8260. It consists of a complete skull, preserved in occlusion with the mandible (lower jaw). To facilitate greater study and research of the specimen, it was μCT-scanned at the European Synchrotron Radiation Facility in France.

In 2026, Zanildo Macungo and colleagues described Jirahgorgon ceto as a new genus and species of gorgonopsian based on these fossil remains, establishing BP/1/8260 as the holotype specimen. The generic name, Jirahgorgon, honors Evolutionary Studies Institute (ESI) curator Sifelani Jirah, whose work focuses on fossils from South Africa's Karoo Basin, especially those of Permian therapsids. This is combined with 'gorgon'—alluding to a trio of monsters in Greek mythology—refers to the larger clade, Gorgonopsia, to which the taxon belongs. The specific name, ceto, is also derived from Greek myth, wherein Ceto is the mother of the gorgons and the wife of Phorcys (for whom the closely related gorgonopsian Phorcys was named).

== Classification ==
To test the affinities and relationships of Jirahgorgon, Macungo et al. (2026) included it in an updated version of the phylogenetic matrix of Macungo et al. (2025). This dataset recovered Jirahgorgon as a member of the newly recognized family Phorcyidae within the Gorgonopsia, as the sister taxon to Phorcys. Gorgonops and Eriphostoma were recovered as successive earlier-diverging lineages. These results are displayed in the cladogram below:

- †Gorgonopsia
  - Nochnitsa geminidens
  - - Viatkogorgon ivakhnenkoi
    - - "Russian clade"
        - Suchogorgon golubevi
        - - Sauroctonus progressus
          - - Pravoslavlevia parva
            - - Inostrancevia africana
              - Inostrancevia alexandri
      - "African clade"
        - - Eriphostoma microdon
          - - Gorgonops torvus
            - - Jirahgorgon ceto
              - Phorcys dubei
        - - Cynariops robustus
          - - Lycaenops ornatus
            - - - Arctops willistoni
                - - DA21/17-01-01
                    (Port des Canonge Fm. gorgonopsian)
                  - Smilesaurus ferox
              - - Arctognathus curvimola
                - Rubidgeinae
                  ⊞
                  - Aelurognathus tigriceps
                  - - Ruhuhucerberus haughtoni
                    - - - Sycosaurus laticeps
                        - Sycosaurus nowaki
                      - Rubidgeini
                        - Leontosaurus vanderhorsti
                        - - Dinogorgon rubidgei
                          - - Clelandina rubidgei
                            - Rubidgea atrox
                  ⊟
