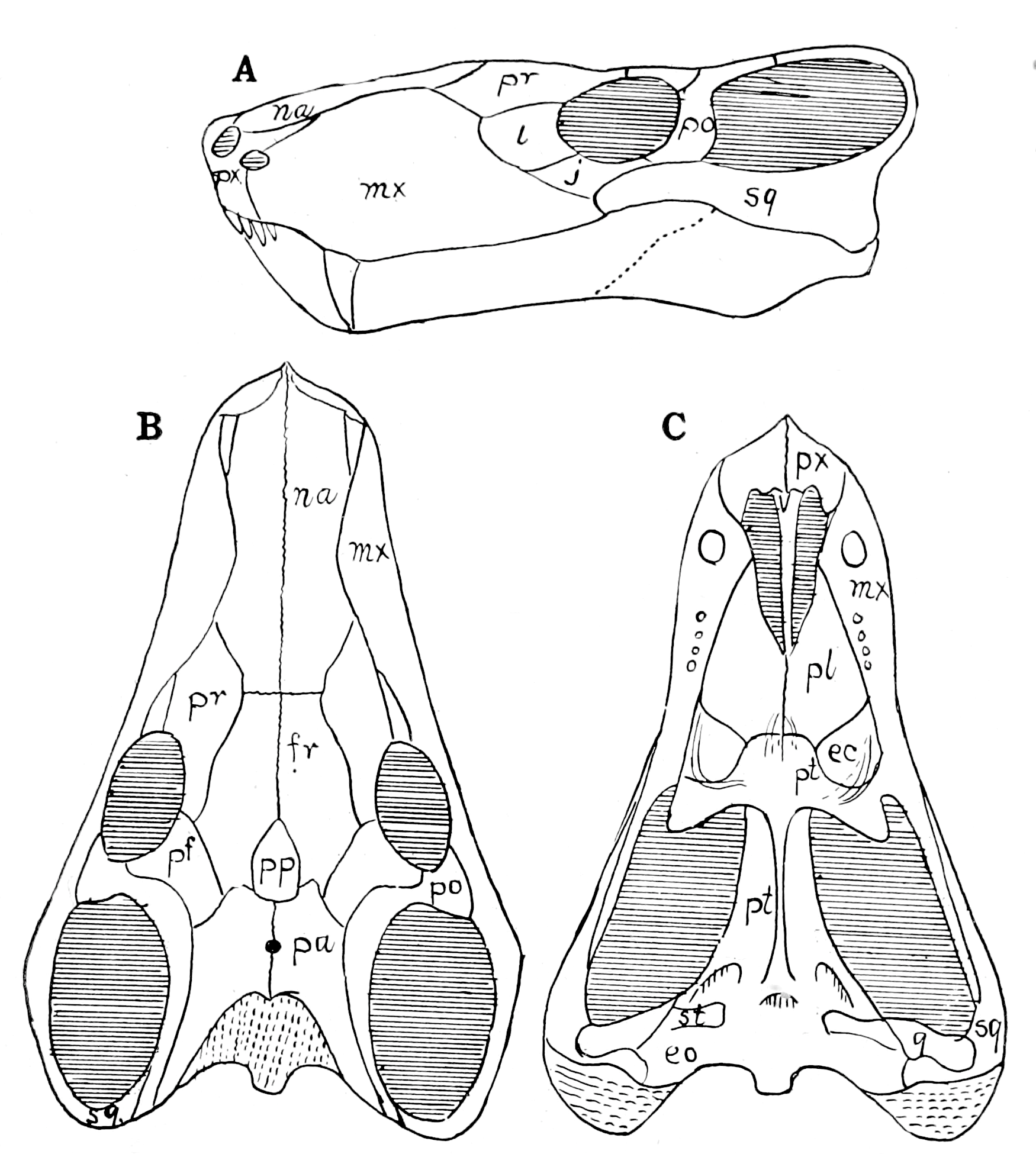
- Skull in lateral, dorsal, and ventral views

Scientific classification
- Domain: Eukaryota
- Kingdom: Animalia
- Phylum: Chordata
- Clade: Synapsida
- Clade: Therapsida
- Clade: †Gorgonopsia
- Family: †Gorgonopsidae
- Subfamily: †Gorgonopsinae
- Genus: †Scylacops; Broom, 1913

S. capensis and S. bigendens
- Type species S. capensis

= Scylacops =

Scylacops Temporal range: Late Permian; 259.0 to 254.0 Ma

Extinct genus of therapsids

Scylacops (meaning "face that tears") is an extinct genus of Gorgonopsia. It was first named by Broom in 1913, and contains two species, S. bigendens, and S. capensis. Its fossils have been found in South Africa and Zambia. It is believed to be closely related to the Gorgonopsian Sauroctonus progressus. Scylacops was a moderately sized Gorgonopsid.

Scylacops is a carnivorous therapsid, existing from 259.0 to 254.0 Ma. S. bigendens was first described by Brink and James Kitching in 1953, although its original description was Sycocephalus bigendens.

According to the paleobiology database Scylacops specimens have been found in the following locations in South Africa; Uitsspansfontein at Beaufort West, Dunedin, Wellwood, and Sondagsriviershoek. Scylacops is also known from Zambia.

== Systematics ==
Although there have been multiple alignments for Scylacops within Gorgonopsidae starting with Broom's original declaration that Scylacops is “allied with Gorgonops torous,” morphological similarities point to it as a close relative of Sauroctonus progressus. Battail & Surkov described Gorgonopsinae a subfamily of Gorgonopsidae. However, now only Rubidgeinae is recognized as a sub-family of Gorgonopsidae. Because Battail & Surkov diagnosed Scylacops as Gorgonopsinae, a description of Gorgonopsinae is warranted. Gorgonopsinae is diagnosed by a thin zygomatic arch, a ventrally extended edge of posterior cranial roof, an often present preparietal and a post temporal fossa oriented horizontally. Because of the research and analysis of Battail & Surkov, a phylogeny which includes Scylacops as sister Sauroctonus to can be inferred.

- - Nochnitsa
  - - Viatkogorgon
    - - - Suchogorgon
        - - Sauroctonus
          - - Pravoslavlevia
            - Inostrancevia
      - - Eriphostoma
        - - Gorgonops
          - - Cynariops
            - - Lycaenops
              - - Smilesaurus
                - Arctops
              - - Arctognathus
                - Rubidgeinae
                  - Aelurognathus
                  - - Ruhuhucerberus
                    - - Sycosaurus
                      - Rubidgeini
                        - Leontosaurus
                        - - Dinogorgon
                          - - Clelandina
                            - Rubidgea

Phylogeny of Gorgonopsia according to Bendel et al. 2018

Because of Scylacops’ relationships in the Therapsid clade. Broom describes the key morphological differences between Gorgonopsia and Therocephalia. Gorgonopsia have a broad parietal region vs a narrow one in Therocephalians. Gorgonopsians have a preparietal while Therocephalians do not. Gorgonopsians have a large post frontal while Therocephalians have a small one. Gorgonopsians have a single true vomer while Therocephalians have a pair of prevomers. Gorgonopsians have strong mandible symphysis while Therocephalians have loosely articulated jaws. Gorgonopsians have an angular with a deep grove while they are perforated in Therocephalians.

Analysis shows cyclical growth in cortical fibrolamellar bone tissue in Scylacops. Early–Middle Triassic non-mammalian cynodonts Cynognathus and Early Jurassic Tritylodon exhibit rapid, sustained growth and are placed closer to crown Mammalia.

== Description/morphology ==
A Lateral view diagnoses include a large septomaxilla, a large prefrontal which meets the post- frontal and shuts out the frontal from the orbital margin, and the increased forward extension of the zygomatic portion of the squamosal. Dorsal view diagnoses include a large frontal which does not reach the orbital margins, behind the frontal is a large postfrontal bounded by the prefrontal, the frontal, the parietal, and the postorbital. Scylacops has 5 incisors 1 canine and 3 molars. Scylacops has a similar occipital region to Lycaenops ornatus, another gorgonopsian discovered by Broom in 1920. Its occipital region is described with the following characteristics. The interparietal is a large broad bone between the parietal and supraoccipital. The interparietal is entirely on the occipital face. Below it lies a large broad supraoccipital forming the upper margin of the foramen magnum. The interparietal articulates inferiorly with the exoccipital and the opisthotic with the tabular forming the outer portion of the occiput. Above the interparietal is articulation with the parietal and the squamosal. As part of the articulation with the quadrate is a long process lying against the squamosal externally and the opisthotic internally. The exoccipitals are small and form the lateral walls of the foramen magnum.

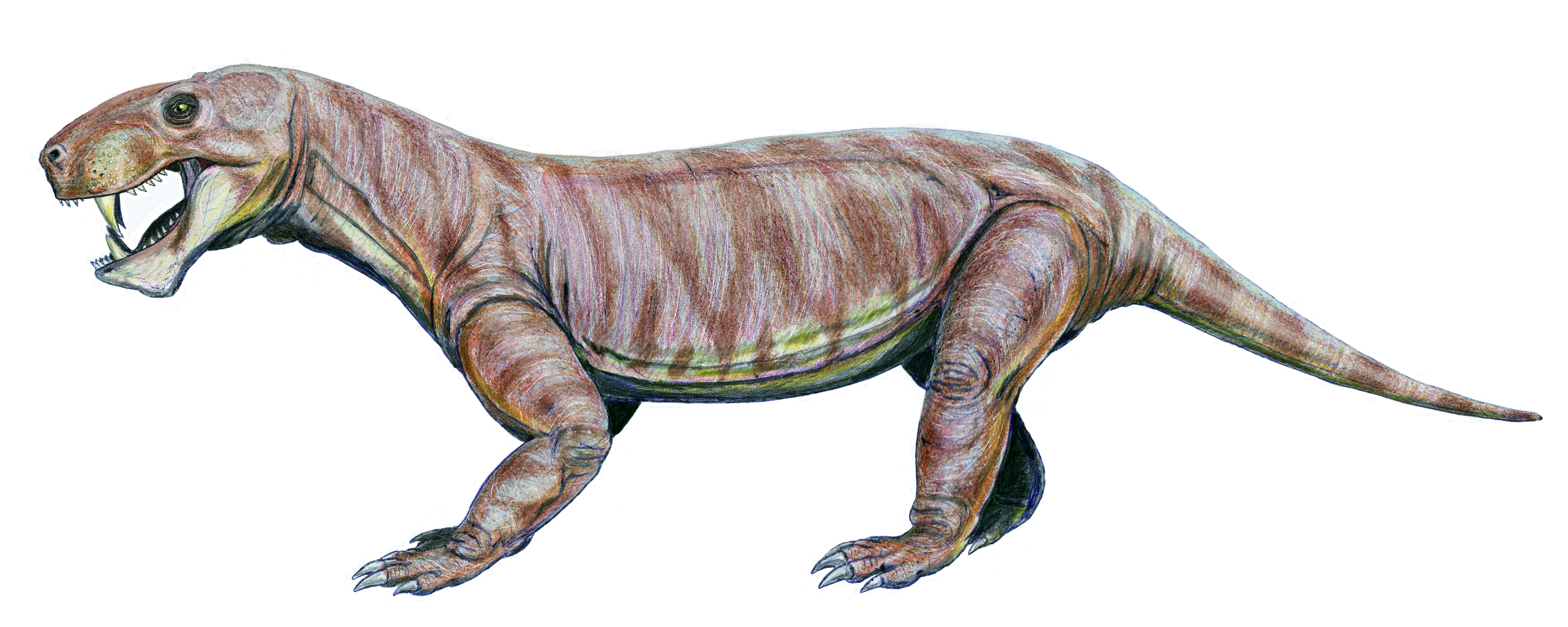
Sauroctonus progressus

Battail & Surkov describe Scylacops as the closest overall morphological relative to the Russian gorgonopsine Sauroctonus progressus. Battail & Surkov diagnose S. progressus by small orbits, a skull narrow posteriorly, infraorbital and temporal widths are very narrow, the postorbital bar widens ventrally with transverse flanges of pterygoids, and has 4-6 upper post canine teeth. Like Scylacops it is considered a medium-sized gorgonopsid. Scylacops SAM-PK-10188 from the Iziko South African Museum has measurements as follows; Humerus 100 mm, Radii 83.25 mm, Ulna 99 mm, Femur 174.8 mm, Fibula, 96.67 mm.

== Histology ==
Therapsids have quick osteogenesis in the cortical fibrolamellar bone tissue. Analysis of Scylacops sp. specimen SAM-PK-10188 from Dunedin shows a cyclical and zonal growth pattern. This cyclical growth is a strong effect of Scylacops’ environment. Scylacops’ cortical fibrolamellar bone tissue shows a phylogenic relationship between Scylacops and the gorgonopsid from the Rubidgeinae sub-family Aelurognathus. However, there is a clear distinction between the two. Scylacops was distinctly cyclical with intermediate growth, where periods of fast growth were interrupted by periods of slow growth or halting of growth. Aelurognathus sustained fast growth early in ontogeny only to be interrupted at a later stage of growth.

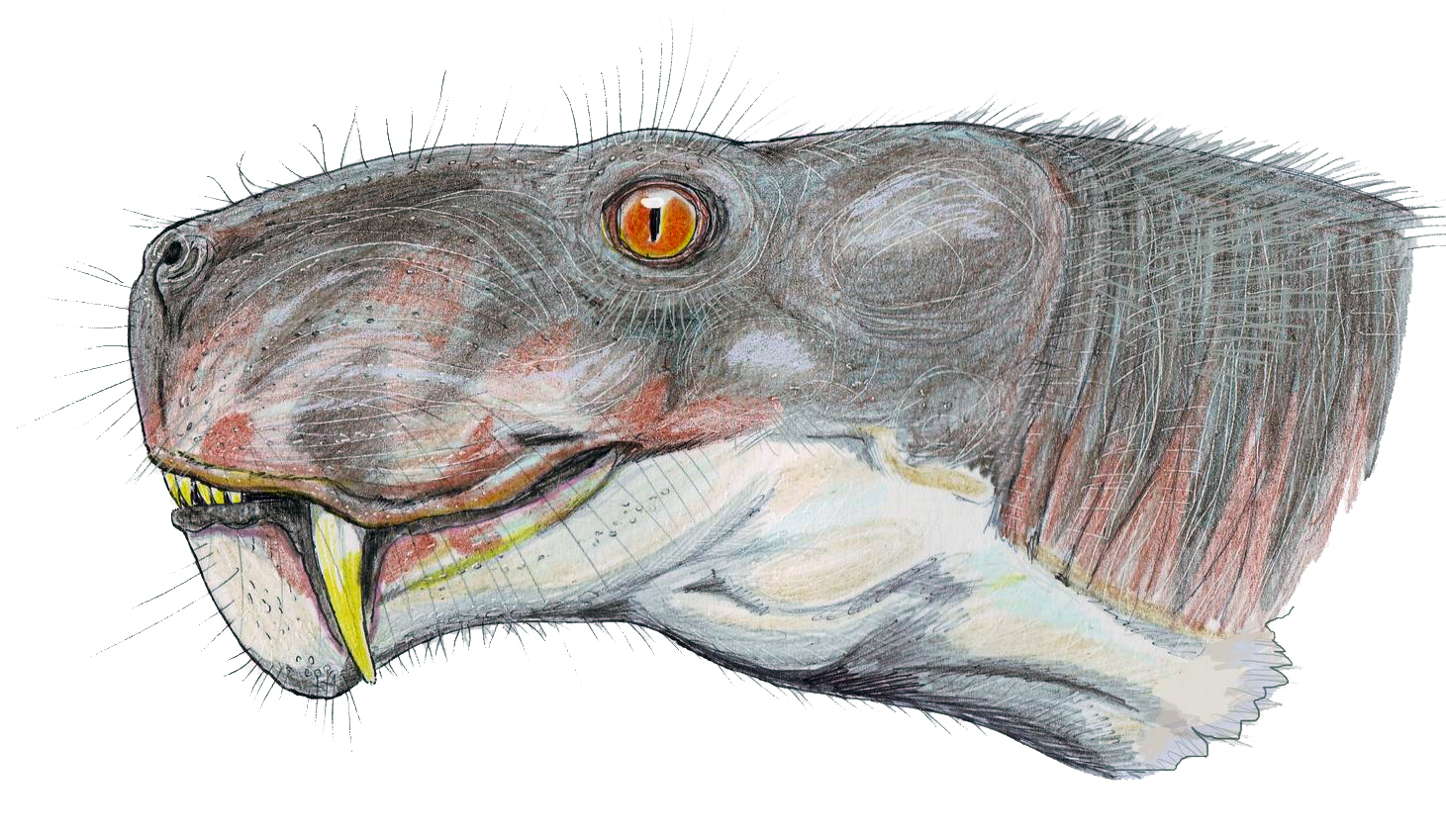
Aelurognathus tigriceps

SAM-PK-10188’s histology shows wide zones separated by annuli and LAGs. These wide zones are composed of a woven-fibered bone matrix with mainly longitudinally oriented channels and osteonal deposits forming primary osteons and fibrolamellar bone tissue. The outer cortical periphery is irregular with few channels opening subperiosteally. The longitudinally oriented channels in this region show few osteonal deposits and are larger than well-developed primary osteons. Organization of primary osteons varies depending on the element and even locally within the same section. The medullary cavity in all the elements are lined by endosteally lamellated bone the extent of which varies depending on the position and type of element. Secondary reconstruction is prevalent in the inner cortex resulting in enlarged resorption cavities.

== Stratigraphy ==
Stratigraphy of the Karoo Supergroup in the Karoo Basin
Period	Group	Formation west of 24°E	Formation east of 24°E	Assemblage Zone
Jurassic	Drakensberg	Hiatus	Drakensberg	
Jurassic	Stormberg	Hiatus	Clarens	
Triassic	Stormberg	Hiatus	Elliot	
Triassic	Stormberg	Hiatus	Molteno	
Triassic	Beaufort	Hiatus		
Triassic	Beaufort	Hiatus	Burgersdorp	Cynognathus
Triassic	Beaufort	Hiatus	Katberg	Lystrosaurus
Triassic	Beaufort	Hiatus	Balfour	
Permian	Beaufort	Hiatus	Balfour	Dicynodon
Permian	Beaufort	Teekloof	Balfour	
Permian	Beaufort	Teekloof	Balfour	Cistecephalus
Permian	Beaufort	Teekloof	Middleton	
Permian	Beaufort	Teekloof	Middleton	Tropidostoma
Permian	Beaufort	Teekloof	Middleton	Pristerognathus
Permian	Beaufort	Abrahams-Kraal	Abrahams-Kraal	
Permian	Beaufort	Abrahams-Kraal	Abrahams-Kraal	Tapinocephalus
Permian	Beaufort	Abrahams-Kraal	Abrahams-Kraal	Eodicynodon
Permian	Ecca	Waterford	Waterford	
Permian	Ecca	Tierberg / Fort Brown	Fort Brown	
Permian	Ecca	Laingsburg / Ripon	Ripon	
Permian	Ecca	Collingham	Collingham	
Permian	Ecca	Whitehill	Whitehill	
Permian	Ecca	Prince Albert	Prince Albert	
Carboniferous	Dwyka	Elandsvlei	Elandsvlei	
References: Rubidge (2005), Selden and Nudds (2011).

The Cistecephalus zone is regarding the biostratigraphy of a genus of burrowing dicynodont from the late Permian of South Africa. The strata assigned to the zone is made from gray-green, bluish-green, purple and reddish mudstone with lenticular sandstone and siltstone beds. Fossils mostly are found in mudstone horizons lasting several miles. The Uitsspansfontein locality in Beaufort west is characterized by a low relief and small exposures covering strata immediately below the Cistecephalus band. Beaufort biostratigraphy is made up of five zones, the Daptocephalus, Cistecephalus, Tropidostoma, Pristerognathus and Tapinocephalus. The Cistecephalus zone has an age range of around 257 to 255 ma. Beaufort West is lithographically siliciclastic. The Geologic age in which Scylacops lived across all sites, is the Wuchiapingian, Late Permian.

Parts of the upper Cistecephalus zone may be referenced as Endothiodon zone due to many endothiodont specimens found by Broom and Von Huene directly above the recognized Cistecephalus zone. However, there is no lithological distinction between the two rock beds. They both consist of the same identical gray-green and bluish-green and purple mudstone and shale sediments, interbedded with lenticular sandstone and siltstones. Kitching proposes that the varied color of mudstones and lenticular sandstones are not reliable markers of separation as they do not follow a consistent stratigraphical plane but are sporadic across the Beaufort series.

The only location outside of South Africa where Scylacops has been found is the Madumabisa Mudstone formation in the Drysdall and Kitching locality 3–4, Upper Luangwa Valley, Zambia. It has a mudstone Lithography, and is geologically in the Wuchiapingian.

== See also ==
- List of therapsids
