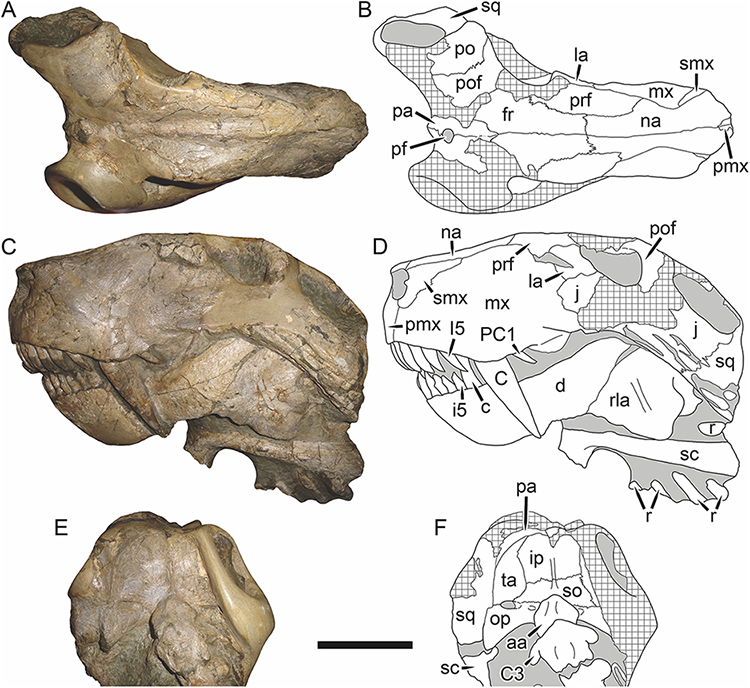
- Holotype skull

Scientific classification
- Kingdom: Animalia
- Phylum: Chordata
- Clade: Synapsida
- Clade: Therapsida
- Clade: †Gorgonopsia
- Family: †Gorgonopsidae
- Genus: †Smilesaurus; Broom, 1948

Type species
- †Smilesaurus ferox Broom, 1948

Synonyms
- Genus level: Pardocephalus Broom, 1948; Species level: Pardocephalus wallacei Broom, 1948; Smilesaurus maccabei Broom, 1948; Aelurognathus ferox Gebauer, 2007

= Smilesaurus =

Smilesaurus Temporal range: Late Permian (Wuchiapingian to Changhsingian), 259–254 Ma

Extinct genus of therapsids

Smilesaurus is an extinct genus of gorgonopsian known from South Africa. It lived during the Late Permian. It contains the single species S. ferox.

== Description ==
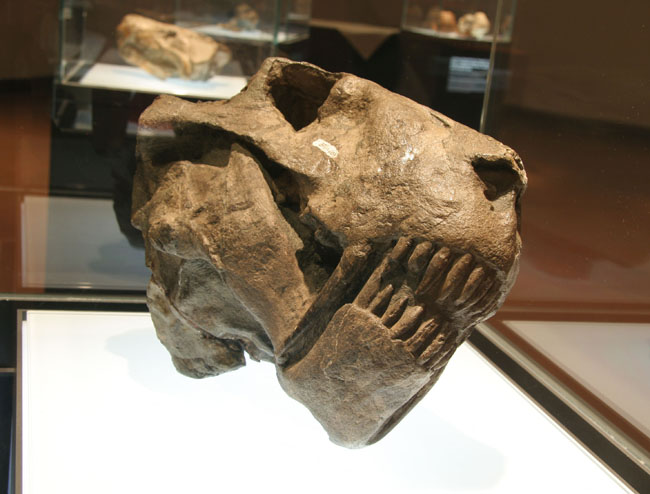
Skull of Smilesaurus ferox

Smilesaurus was a large gorgonopsian, with a skull length of up to 31 centimeters. It is characterized by extremely long canine teeth, and has the proportionally longest canines of any gorgonopsian. Unlike other gorgonopsians, which probably hunted similarly to predatory reptiles, Smilesaurus probably was a true saber-toothed predator which hunted using similar tactics to saber-toothed cats. It can be distinguished by other rubidgeines by its lack of cranial pachyostosis and rugosoties, and by its relatively small orbits.

== Classification ==
The classification of Smilesaurus has been disputed. It has often been included in Rubidgeinae, but it differs from other members of the clade considerably. Instead, it may be more closely related to Arctops, a position supported by a phylogenetic analysis in 2018.

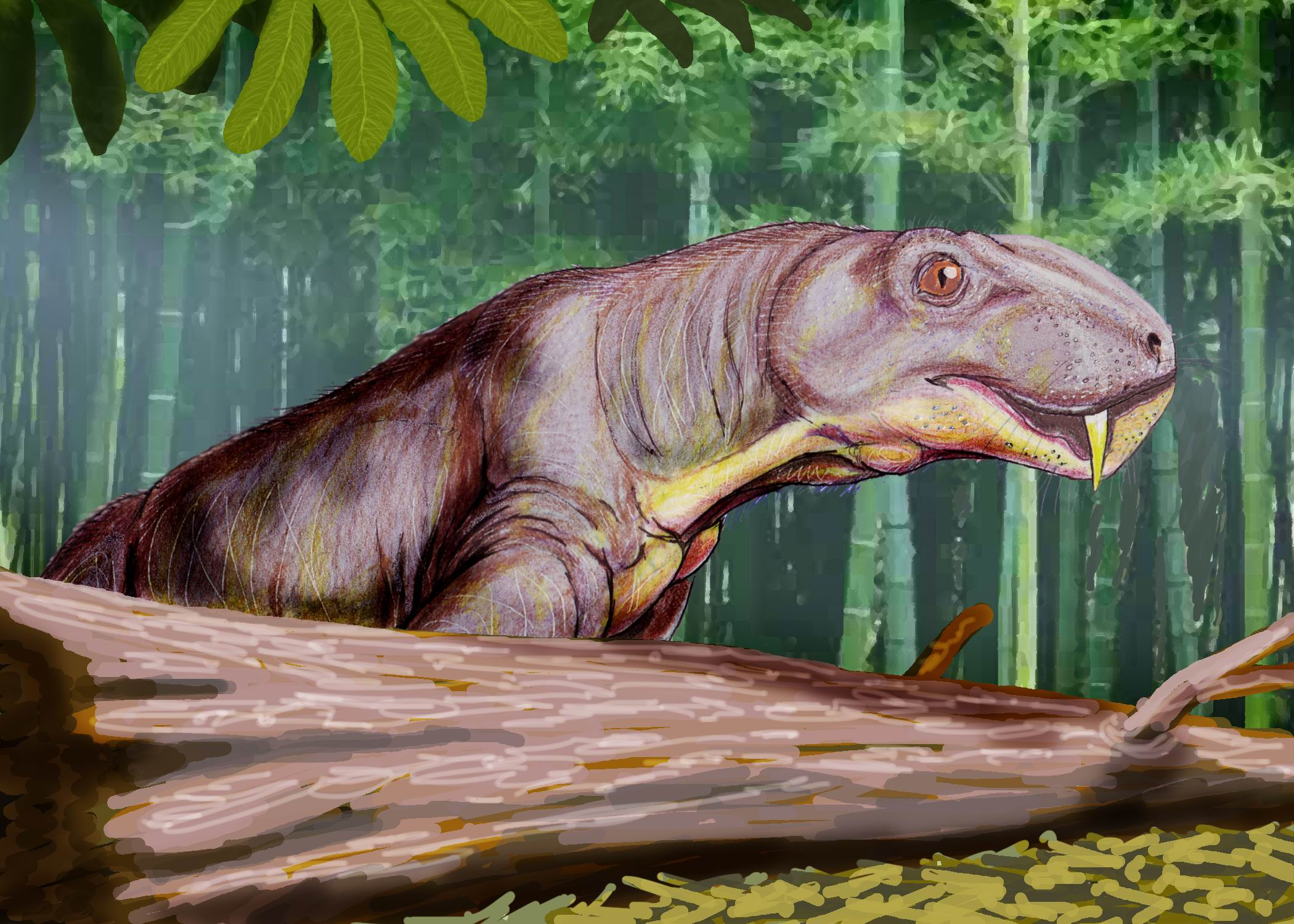
Restoration

Below is a cladogram of Gorgonopsia from Bendel et al., 2018:

- - Nochnitsa
  - - Viatkogorgon
    - - - Suchogorgon
        - - Sauroctonus
          - - Pravoslavlevia
            - Inostrancevia
      - - Eriphostoma
        - - Gorgonops
          - - Cynariops
            - - Lycaenops
              - - Smilesaurus
                - Arctops
              - - Arctognathus
                - Rubidgeinae
                  - Aelurognathus
                  - - Ruhuhucerberus
                    - - Sycosaurus
                      - Rubidgeini
                        - Leontosaurus
                        - - Dinogorgon
                          - - Clelandina
                            - Rubidgea

== See also ==
- List of therapsids
