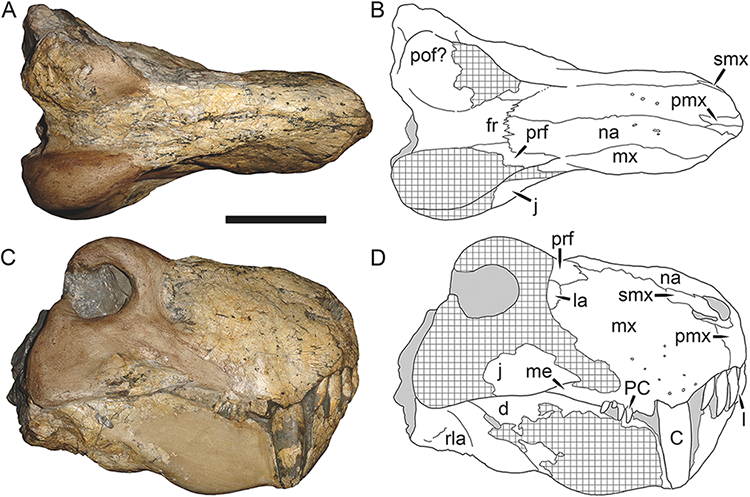
- Holotype skull of D. rubidgei

Scientific classification
- Kingdom: Animalia
- Phylum: Chordata
- Clade: Synapsida
- Clade: Therapsida
- Clade: †Gorgonopsia
- Tribe: †Rubidgeini
- Genus: †Dinogorgon; Broom, 1936

Type species
- †Dinogorgon rubidgei Broom, 1936

Synonyms
- Dinogorgon quinquemolaris Huene, 1950; Dinogorgon oudebergensis Brink & Kitching, 1953; Prorubidgea robusta Brink & Kitching, 1953; Rubidgea quinquemolaris Gebauer, 2007

= Dinogorgon =

Dinogorgon Temporal range: Late Permian (Wuchiapingian to Changhsingian), ~256–254 Ma

Extinct genus of therapsids

Dinogorgon is a genus of gorgonopsian from the Late Permian of South Africa and Tanzania. The generic name Dinogorgon is derived from Greek, meaning "terrible gorgon", while its species name rubidgei is taken from the surname of renowned Karoo paleontologist, Professor Bruce Rubidge, who has contributed to much of the research conducted on therapsids of the Karoo Basin. The type species of the genus is D. rubidgei.

Dinogorgon is part of the gorgonopsian subfamily Rubidgeinae, a derived group of large-bodied gorgonopsians known exclusively from the Late Permian (Lopingian). The subfamily first appeared in the Tropidostoma Assemblage Zone, and reached their highest diversity in the Cistecephalus and Daptocephalus assemblage zones of the Beaufort Group in South Africa.

== Classification ==
=== History of Discovery ===
The type specimen of Dinogorgon rubidgei was discovered on Wellwood farm, a farm owned by the grandfather of Bruce Rubidge, Sidney H. Rubidge, outside of Graaff-Reinet. The fossil was recovered by Bruce's aunt Peggy Rubidge in 1934, and were only described by British paleontologist, Sidney H. Haughton, and James Kitching between 1953 and 1965.

=== Phylogeny ===
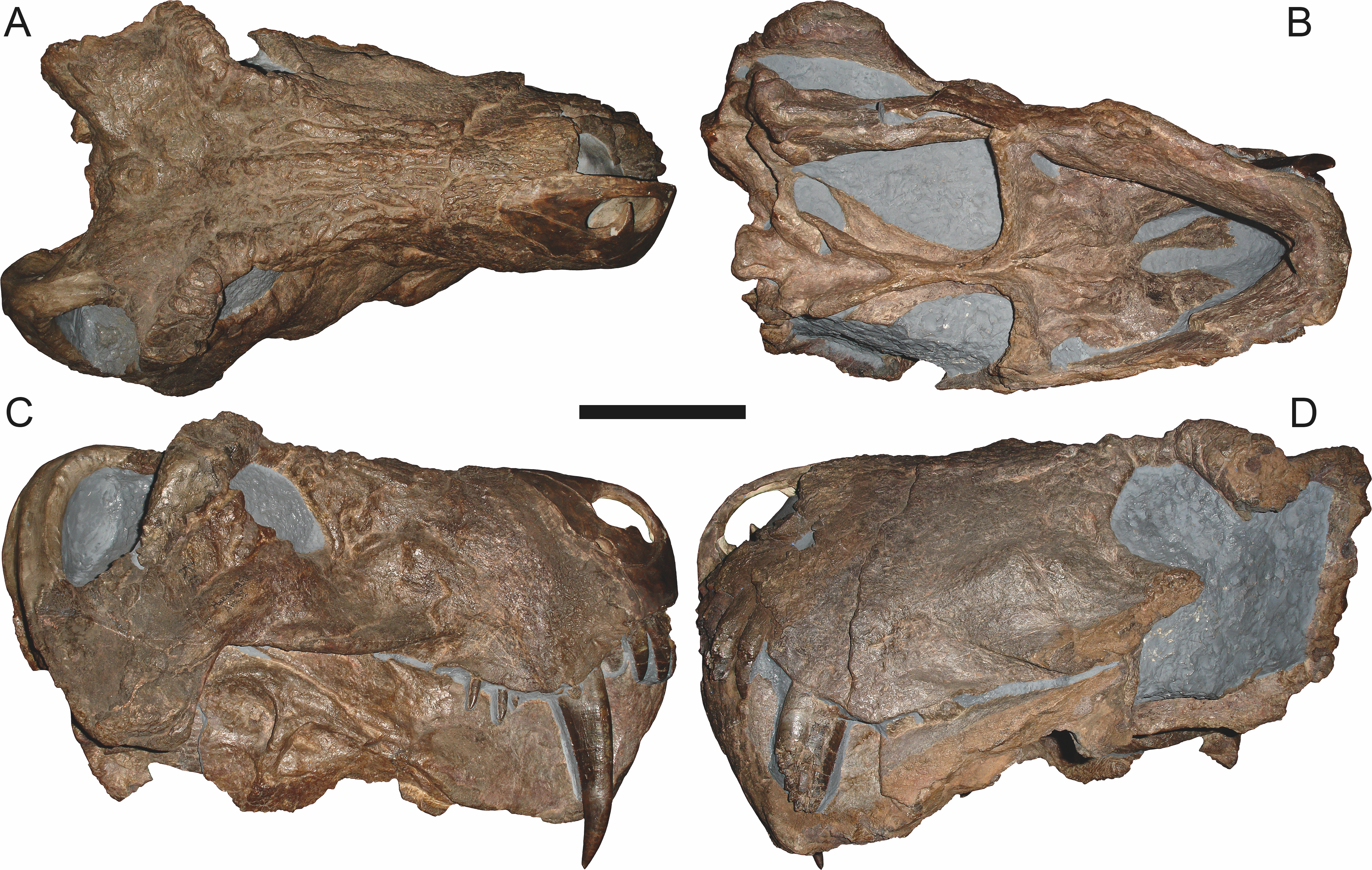
Holotype of D. quinquemolaris, a synonym of D. rubidgei

The Rubidgeinae are a subfamily of derived gorgonopsids that have only been found in Africa. They are composed of six genera and 17 species. The Rubidgeinae are closely related to their sister group, the Inostranceviinae, which have only been found in Russia. Out of the gorgonopsian clade, the systematics of the Rubidgeinae are the best resolved due to their distinctive character traits. The systematics of other gorgonopsian subfamilies remain chaotic due to a high degree of cranial homomorphism between taxa, making it difficult to distinguish different taxa effectively.

Three species were formally recognized in the genus: D. rubidgei, D. quinquemolaris, and D. pricei, but these are now all considered to be D. rubidgei. Dinogorgon shares many characteristics with Rubidgea and Clelandina, which has led some authors to synonymize them. All three are now considered to be part of the same tribe, Rubidgeini, rather than the same genus.

The cladogram below (Kammerer et al. 2016) displays currently accepted systematic relationships of the Gorgonopsia.

- Rubidgeinae
  - Smilesaurus ferox
  - - Aelurognathus tigriceps
    - - Ruhuhucerberus haughtoni
      - - - Sycosaurus laticeps
          - Sycosaurus nowaki
        - Rubidgeini
          - Leontosaurus vanderhosti
          - - Dinogorgon rubidgei
            - - Rubidgea atrox
              - Clelandina rubidgei

== Description ==
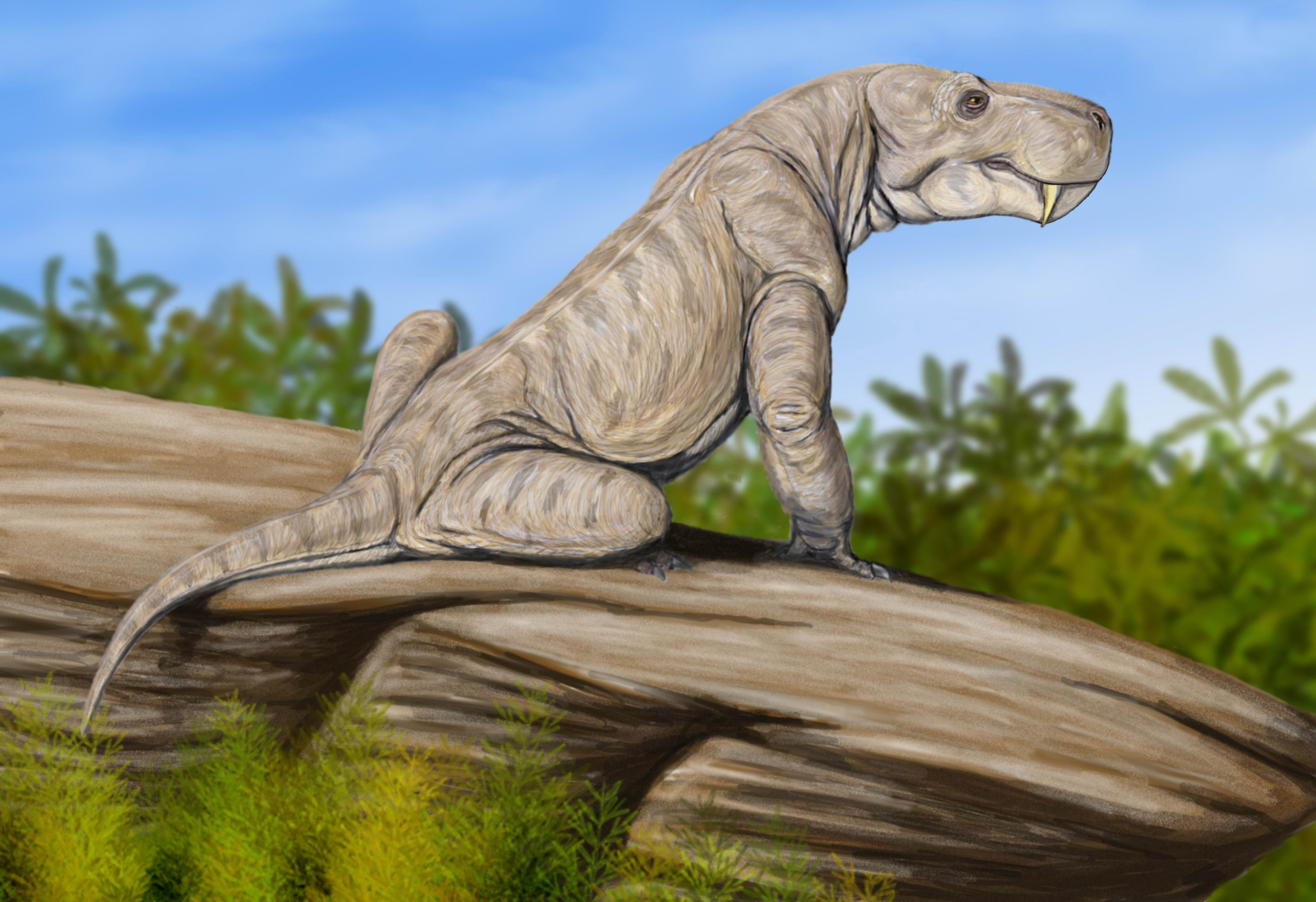
Restoration of D. rubidgei

Dinogorgon was one of the largest species of Rubidgeinae, with the skull length of nearly 40 centimetres (16 in), almost as large as Rubidgea had. Like more derived rubidgeines, Dinogorgon had a number of bosses on its skull, likely to reduce the stresses caused by struggling prey. Its snout was deep but narrow, similar to Aelurognathus, but narrower than Rubidgea and Clelandina. It had 4 to 5 upper and lower postcanine teeth, which further distinguishes it from Rubidgea.

== Palaeoenvironment ==
Numerous therapsid species, including rubidgenine gorgonopsids, are used as biostratigraphic markers in other African basins, such as the Upper Madumabisa Mudstone of Zambia, the Usili Formation of Tanzania, and the Chiweta Beds of Malawi. Dinogorgon was believed to have predated upon reptiles and smaller therapsids.
