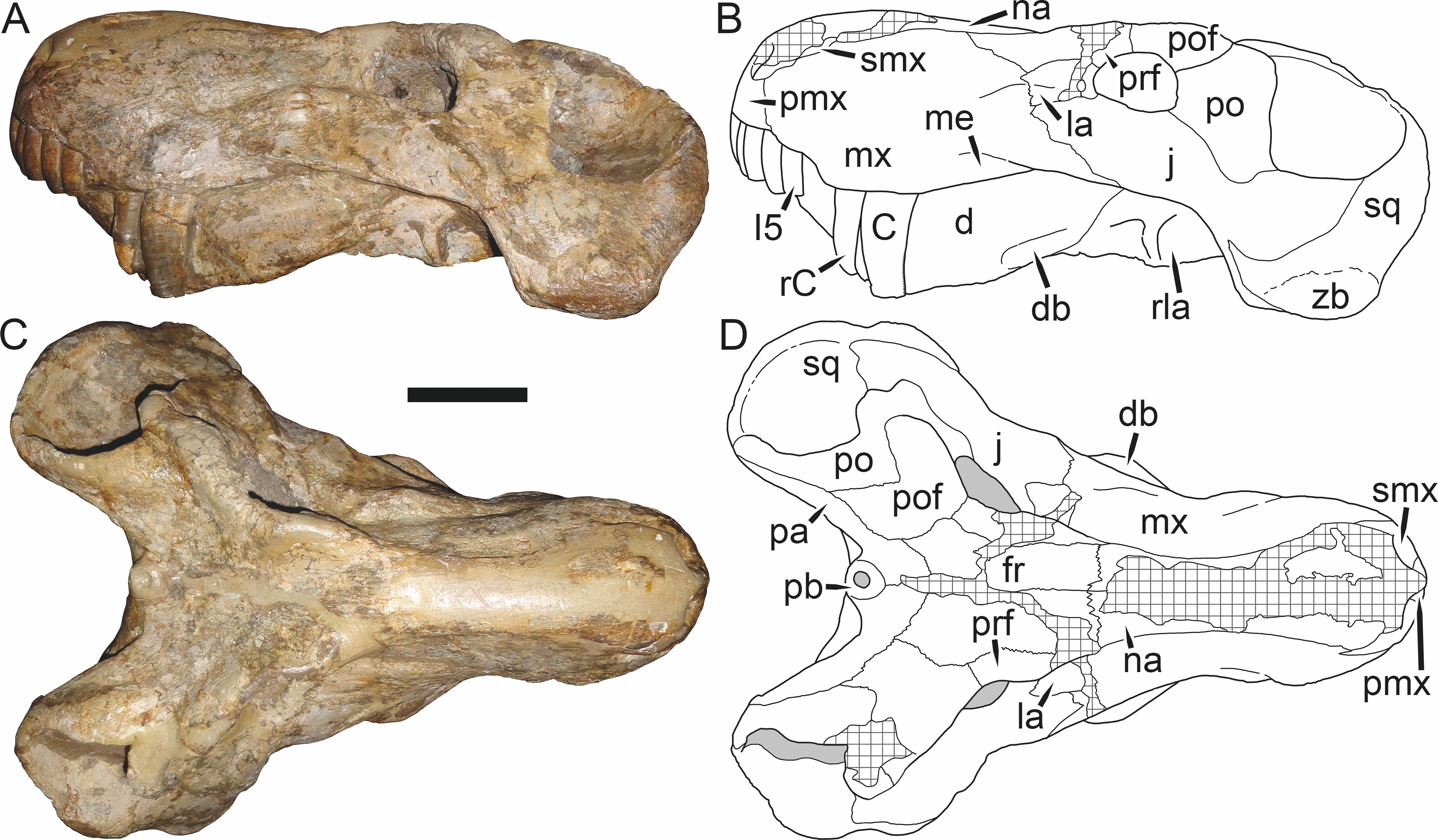
- Dorsal and lateral view of the holotype (RC 13)

Scientific classification
- Kingdom: Animalia
- Phylum: Chordata
- Clade: Synapsida
- Clade: Therapsida
- Clade: †Gorgonopsia
- Tribe: †Rubidgeini
- Genus: †Rubidgea

Type species
- †Rubidgea atrox Broom, 1938

Synonyms
- Genus-level: Broomicephalus Brink & Kitching, 1953; Titanogorgon Maisch, 2002; Species-level: Rubidgea kitchingi Broom, 1938; Rubidgea laticeps Broom, 1940; Gorgonognathus maximus Huene, 1950; Broomicephalus laticeps Brink & Kitching, 1953; Rubidgea majora Brink & Kitching, 1953; Dinogorgon (Broomicephalus) laticeps Watson & Romer, 1956; Titanogorgon maximus Maisch, 2002; Clelandina laticeps Gebauer, 2007; Rubidgea platyrhina

= Rubidgea =

Rubidgea Temporal range: Late Permian (Wuchiapingian to Changhsingian), c. 256–253.48 Ma

Extinct genus of therapsids

Rubidgea is an extinct monospecific genus of carnivorous therapsid from the Late Permian of South Africa and Tanzania. The genus was originally thought to have consisted of four species; the type species R. atrox, R. majora, R. kitchingi, R. platyrhina, and R. laticeps. However recent analysis found the three other species were synonymous to R. atrox. The generic name Rubidgea honours fossil hunter Sidney Rubidge. Its species name, atrox, is derived from Latin, meaning "fierce, savage, terrible". Rubidgea is part of the subfamily Rubidgeinae, a derived group of gorgonopsians. Gorgonopsians were a clade of saber-toothed predators that first appeared in the Middle (or Early) Permian, and were the first group of synapsids to have specialized saber-like canines. The largest specimen, BP/1/699, had a skull measuring 47.5 cm (18.7 in), making Rubidgea was one of the largest gorgonopsians. Rubidgea was likely one of the apex predators of its time and likely competed with large gorgonopsians such as Inostrancevia.

Rubidgea would go extinct shortly before the end of the Permian following a turnover event that separated the lower and upper subzones of the Daptocephalus Assemblage Zone. This turnover event was thought to have been the result of aridification, with lacustrine floodplains being replaced by well-drained floodplains. Following its extinction, it was replaced by Inostrancevia in South Africa for the remainder of the Permian.

== Taxonomy ==
=== Discovery ===
The first Rubidgea fossil was discovered by C. J. M. "Croonie" Kitching, the father of renowned paleontologist James Kitching, on the farm Doornberg outside the small town Nieu-Bethesda during the early 1930s. In a paper published in 1938, Robert Broom named the fossil Rubidgea kitchingi. Broom noted the large size of the new gorgonopsid fossil, stating that it was a new species. Subsequent discoveries in the following decades confirmed Broom's suspicions that a new subfamily of gorgonopsians should be categorized, and the Rubidgeinae was erected.

=== Classification ===
The Rubidgeinae are a subfamily of derived gorgonopsians that have only been found in Africa. They are composed of six genera and 9 species. Rubidgeinae are distantly related to the subfamily Inostranceviinae, which have only been mostly been found in Russia. Out of the gorgonopsian clade, the systematics of the Rubidgeinae is the best resolved due to their distinctive character traits. The systematics of other gorgonopsian subfamilies remain chaotic due to a high degree of cranial homomorphism between taxa, making it difficult to distinguish different taxa effectively.

Within his diagnostic analysis of the genus in his 2016 paper, Kammerer recovered R. majora, R. kitchingi, R. platyrhina, and R. laticeps as to be specimens of R. atrox, suggesting the genus consisted of one species. Additionally, previously described gorgonopsians, such as Titanogorgon maximus, were recovered as junior synonym of R. atrox due to the lack of autapomorphies distinguishing it from South African specimens of Rubidgea. Within the same paper, Kammerer found Titanogorgon and Broomicephalus to be synonymous with R. atrox, with the latter recovered to be juvenile specimens within the species. Phylogenetic analysis recovered Rubidgea as a sister taxon of Clelandina, with both taxa being the most derived genera in the subfamily.

The cladogram below (Kammerer and Rubidge 2022) displays the currently accepted systematic relationships of the Gorgonopsia.

- Gorgonopsia
  - Nochnitsa
  - - Viatkogorgon
    - - "Russian clade"
        - Suchogorgon
        - - Sauroctonus
          - - Pravoslavlevia
            - Inostrancevia
      - "African clade"
        - Phorcys
        - Eriphostoma
        - Gorgonops
        - - Cynariops
          - - Lycaenops
            - - Smilesaurus
              - Arctops
            - Rubidgeinae
              - Arctognathus
              - - Aelurognathus
                - - Ruhuhucerberus
                  - - Sycosaurus
                    - Rubidgeini
                      - Leontosaurus
                      - - Dinogorgon
                        - - Clelandina
                          - Rubidgea

=== Evolution ===
Gorgonopsians are a major group of carnivorous therapsids, the oldest known definitive specimen coming from the Mediterranean island of Mallorca, dating to at least Wordian stage of the Middle Permian, with the possibility of dating to the Early Permian. The clade was thought to have split off from Eutheriodontia either during the Kungurian stage of the Early Permian or during the Roadian stage of the Middle Permian. Gorgonopsians were the first group of carnivores to develop saber teeth, before the appearance of dinosaurs and mammals. This feature later evolved independently multiple times in different predatory mammal groups, such as machaeroidines, nimravids, thylacosmilids, and machairodonts.

During the Middle Permian, the majority of representatives of the clade were quite small and their ecosystems were mainly dominated by dinocephalians, large therapsids characterized by robust cranial bones. The most common predators within the Middle Permian were basal therocephalians, another group of sabertoothed predators, which limited the diversity of gorgonopsians. However, some genera, such as Phorcys and Jirahgorgon, are relatively larger in size and already occupy the role of apex predator in one of the oldest geological strata of the Karoo Supergroup. After the Capitanian extinction, gorgonopsians began to occupy ecological niches abandoned by anteosaurs and basal therocephalians, and adopted an increasingly imposing size, which very quickly gave them the role of apex predators.

Geographically, gorgonopsians are mainly recovered in the present territories of Africa and European Russia, however, an indeterminate specimen having been identified in the Turpan Depression, in northwestern China, as well as a possible fragmentary specimen discovered in the Kundaram Formation, located in central India. The geographic distribution of rubidgeine was restricted to Africa, with their northernmost record being within the Moradi Formation of Niger. Rubidgeines first appeared in the Tropidostoma-Gorgonops subzone, although they became more diverse in the following assemblage zones.

== Description ==
=== Size ===
Size comparison of R. atrox compared to a 1.8 m (5.9 ft) tall human

Rubidgea was the largest African gorgonopsian, as well as one of the largest known gorgonopsians, only being rivaled by Inostrancevia. However, the sizes of the genus has varied between studies. GPIT K46 was a gigantic partial skull recovered from the Usili Formation, Maisch (2002) estimated the specimen had a total skull length of 50 cm (20 in). However, other studies have suggested a lower skull length for the largest specimens. Antón (2013) estimated Rubidgea had a skull length of 45 cm (18 in) and a total body length of 3 metres (9.8 ft). Kammerer (2016) estimated the holotype, RC 13, had skull measuring 40.2 cm (15.8 in), similar in size to the largest Dinogorgon and Leontosaurus specimens. In the same paper, Kammerer estimated the largest Rubidgea specimens had skulls measuring 45 cm (18 in) with BP/1/699 and BP/1/195 having the most massive skulls among the specimens analyzed. Kammerer et al. (2023) recovered BP/1/699 as the largest known rubidgeine, with an estimated skull length of 47.5 cm (18.7 in). The authors noted the specimen was similar in size to the holotype and paratype of Inostrancevia africana. The only gorgonopsian that exceeded Rubidgea in size were Inostrancevia alexandri and Inostrancevia latifrons, with a skull length of 50 cm (20 in) and 60 cm (24 in) respectively.

=== Skull and dentition ===
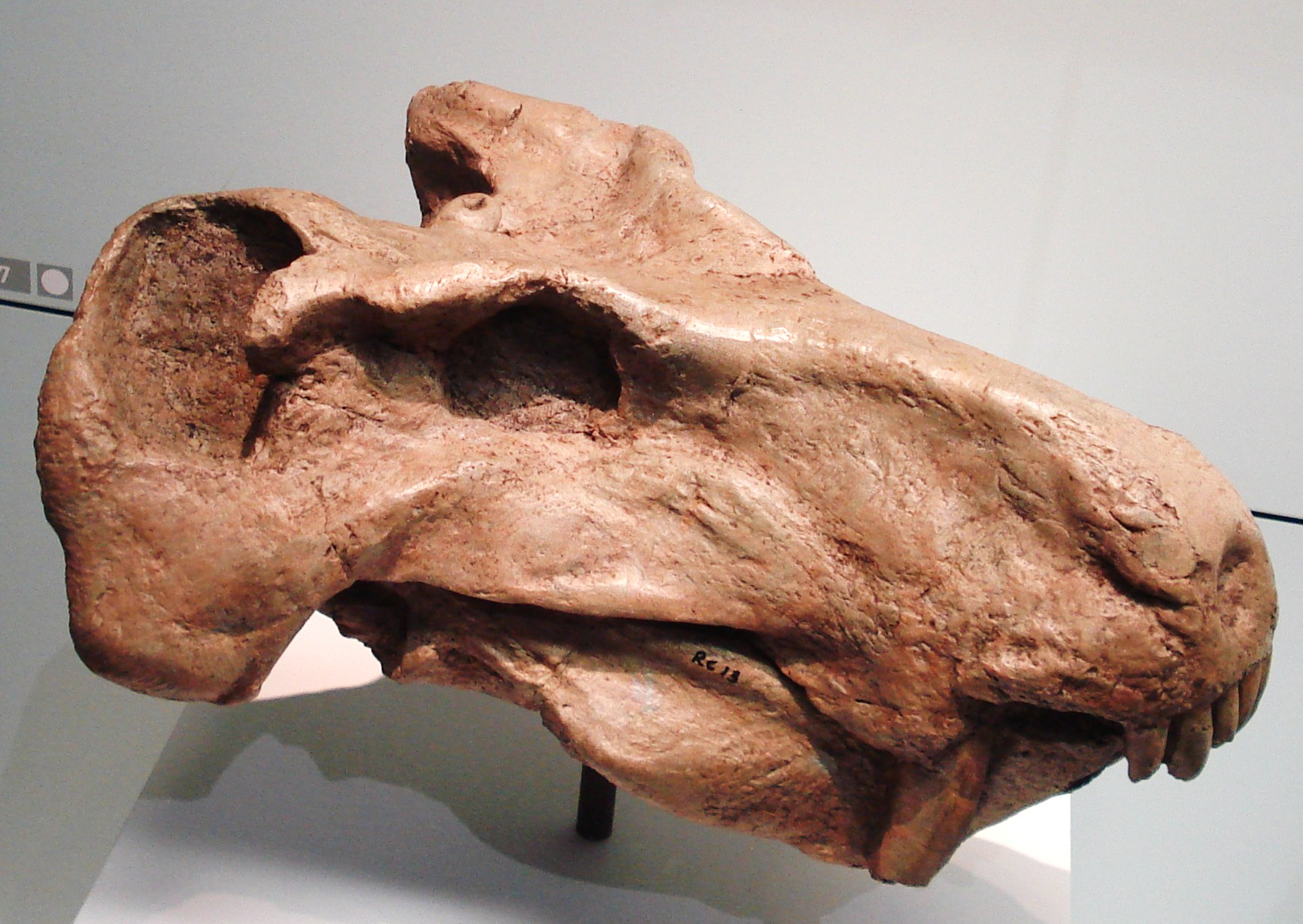
Skull of R. atrox

The skull of Rubidgea was noted to have approached the length of Inostrancevia, but was significantly more robust. It can be distinguished from other rubidgeines by an elongated boss present on the edge of dentary, posterior flange of postorbital bar in form of a rounded boss, and a jugal broadly exposed dorsal to squamosal in the subtemporal bar. Additional distinguishes included the combination of 1-2 upper postcanines and the absence of lower postcanines, reduced dentition palatine boss, well-developed supraorbital bosses, and a bulbous snout. Juvenile Rubidgea (formerly known as Broomicephalus) were noted to have maximum skull widths that exceeded skull length.

The dentition of the animal showed characteristics of ziphodonty, serrated teeth. The incisors and canines of Rubidgea were noted to have been very large, with the canines being longer than the teeth of Tyrannosaurus.

== Paleobiology ==
=== Bite mechanics ===
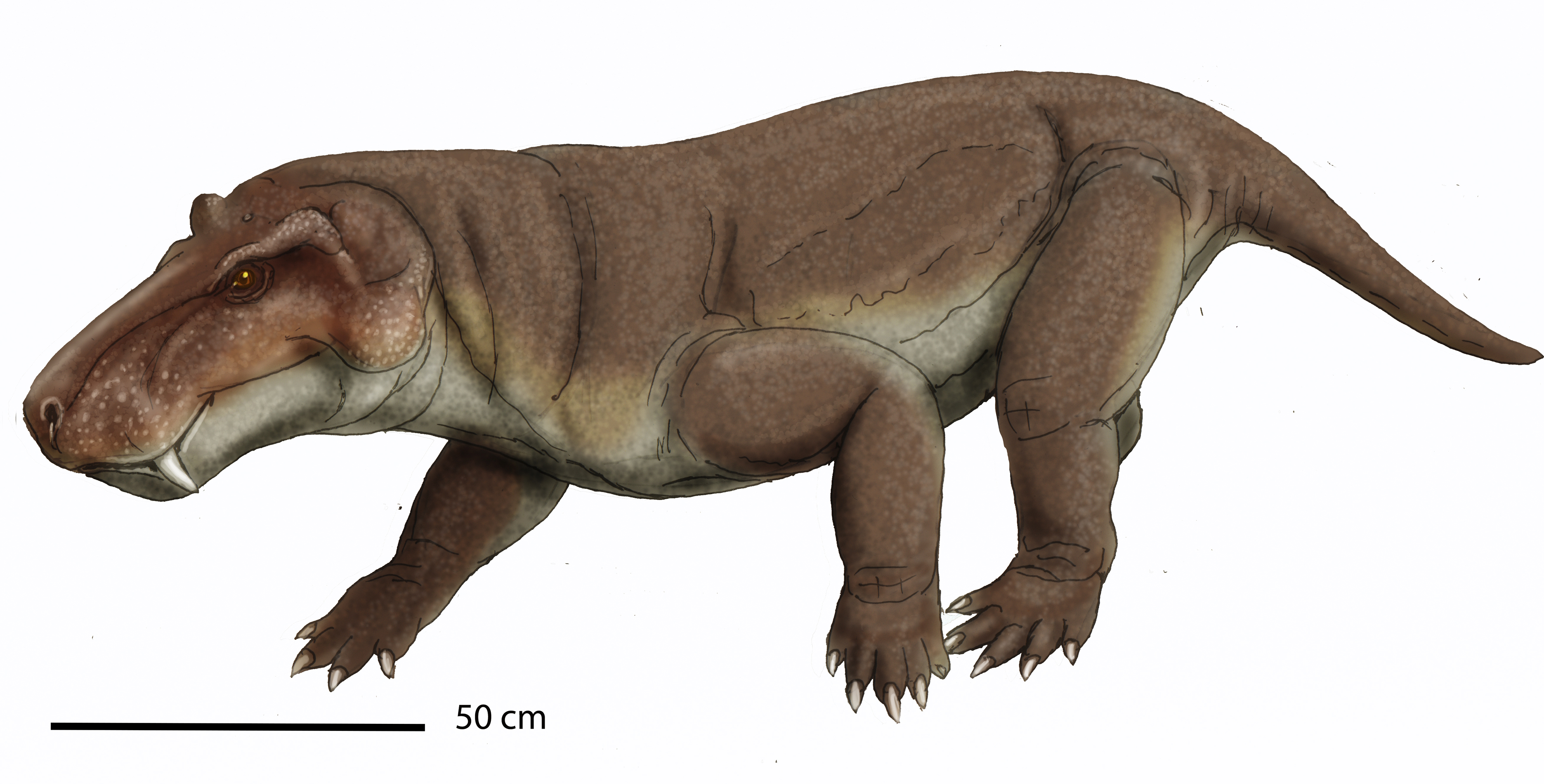
Life reconstruction of R. atrox

Rubidgea was thought to have been heavily-built, large-bodied apex predator, that supported a thick skull with long, sabre-like canines. Rubidgeines are known for the robust development of their skull roof ranging from rugose dorsal margins of the orbit to the massive supraorbital bosses within rubidgeins. Rubidgea was considered to have the most developed cranial feature among the rubidgeines with well-developed supraorbital, postorbital, subtemporal, and dentary bosses. The well-developed supraorbital bosses would've acted as a protective 'sink' for stresses inflected onto prey. Rubidgea was extremely convergent with the anteosaur Anteosaurus, from the supraorbital bosses down to the lateral mandibular bosses of unknown function.

Biomechanical analysis by Lautenschlager et al. (2020) estimated that Rubidgea had a maximum jaw gape of 78°, with an effective gape of 45°. This suggests gorgonopsians were likely specialized on prey similar in size or smaller as their actual jaw gapes were below 80°, in addition to their effective jaw gapes being below 60°. Their model size suggests Rubidgea was capable of producing a bite force of 715 newtons; suggesting massive gorgonopsians, such as Rubidgea, possessed a more powerful bite than other saber-toothed predators, although they lacked the adaptations to crush bone.

However, despite this, a gorgonopsian specimen (SAM-PK-11490) was noted to have an embedded tooth in its snout, with the attacker thought to have been another gorgonopsian. This suggests despite their inability to crush bone, the canines of gorgonopsians were capable of puncturing bone despite their weak bite force. The biting method of gorgonopsians was different from mammalian sabertooths as they relied on kinetic-inertial jaw-closing system similar to modern crocodilians, to deliver fast and powerful jaw closures.

=== Hunting behavior ===
How Rubidgea, as well as other gorgonopsians, hunted their prey has been debated by experts.

Antón provided an overview of gorgonopsian biology in his 2013 book, writing that despite their differences from saber-toothed mammals, many features of their skeletons indicated they were not sluggish reptiles but active predators. While their brains were relatively smaller than those of mammals, and their sideways placed eyes provided limited stereoscopic vision, they had well-developed turbinals in their nasal cavity, a feature associated with an advanced sense of smell, which would have helped them track prey and carrion. The canine saber teeth were used for delivering the slashing killing-bite, while the incisors, which formed an arch in front of the saber teeth, held the prey and cut the flesh while feeding. To allow them to increase their gape when biting, gorgonopsians had several bones in their mandibles that could move in relation to each other and had a double articulation with the skull—unlike in mammals where the rear joint articular bone has become the malleus ear bone. Antón envisioned gorgonopsians would hunt by leaving their cover when prey was close enough, and use their relatively greater speed to pounce quickly on it, grab it with their forelimbs, and bite any part of the body that would fit in their jaws. Such a bite would cause a large loss of blood, but the predator would continue to try to bite vulnerable parts of the body.

Kammerer (2016) suggested Rubidgea relied entirely on their incisors and canines to dispatch prey due to having supraorbital bosses and ziphodonty being comparable to that of jaw reliant predators such as rauisuchians, theropods, and mosasaurs. Within the same paper, he noted most gorgonopsians also hunted in a similar manner. On the other hand, Smilesaurus had exceeding long, blade-like canines, reduced postcanines, and little cranial support for dealing biting down on bone. He concludes Smilesaurus, as well as Inostrancevia, were the only gorgonopsians to have hunted more similarly to machairodonts.

However, postcranial analysis by Bendel et al. on the distantly related Gorgonops torvus found its forelimbs to be notably robust suggesting it (as well as gorgonopsians as a whole) used their forelimbs to grapple prey before using its canines to deliver a powerful bite with its serrated canines. This hunting method is similar felids and gorgonopsians adopted this hunting method may have been more widely. Furthermore analysis on digits of cf. Rubidgea and other carnivorous therapsids by Kümmell and Frey (2014) found the digits of gorgonopsians to be rather nimble. This suggests gorgonopsians had grappling capabilities which enabled them hold onto prey before delivering their saber-like canines. This may have been the prerequisite for the development of saberteeth.

== Paleoecology ==
Numerous therapsid species, including rubidgeine gorgonopsians, are used as biostratigraphic markers in other African Basins, such as the Upper Madumabisa Mudstone Formation of Zambia, and the Chiweta Beds of Malawi.

=== Usili Formation ===
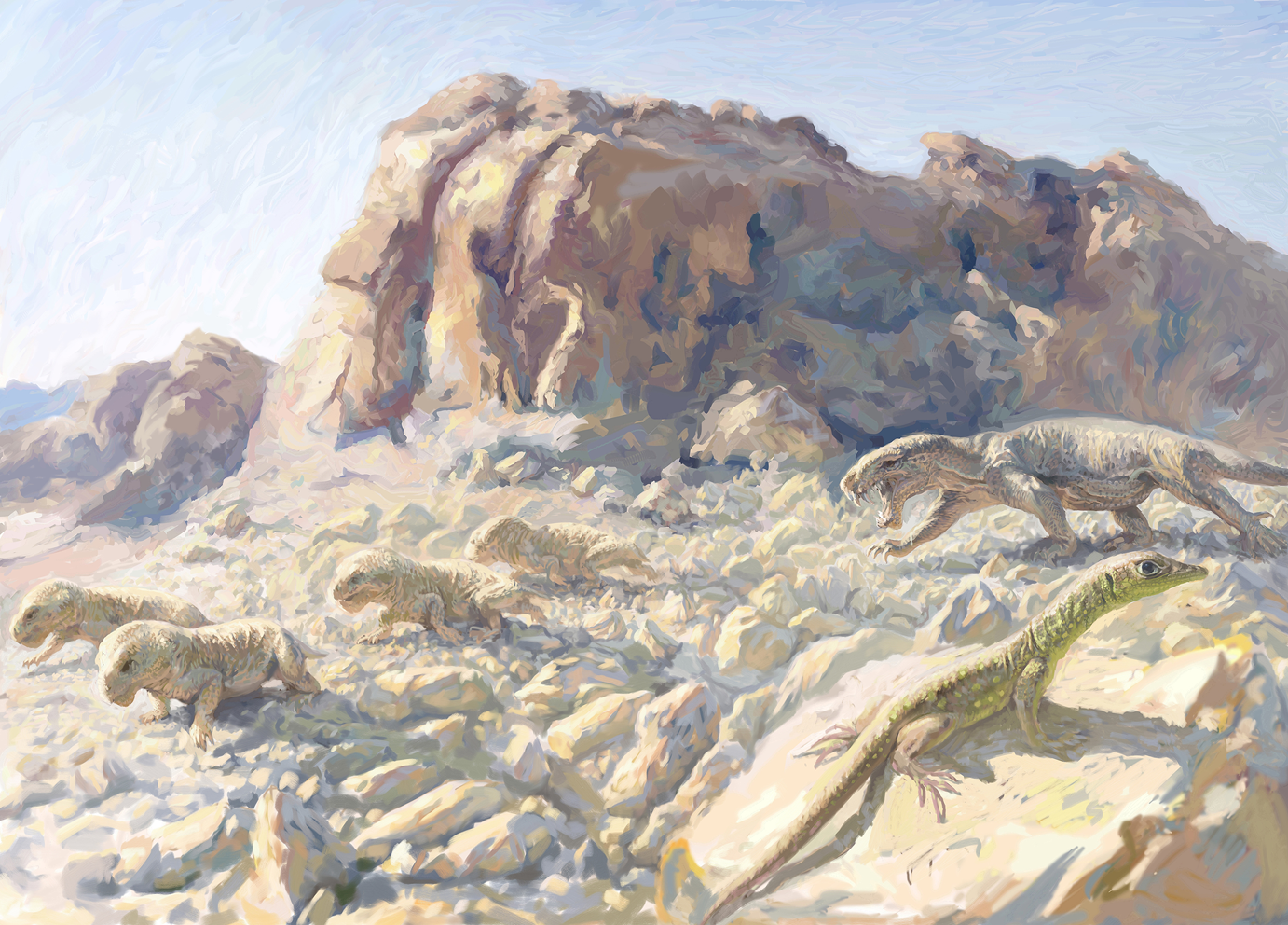
Reconstruction of a gorgonopsian pursuing a herd of Endothiodon, based on the Late Permian Tanzanian Usili Formation

Rubidgea remains have been recovered within Usili Formation of Tanzania, which yielded a diversity of therapsids. Gorgonopsians were represented by rubidgeines such as Ruhuhucerberus, Aelurognathus, Dinogorgon, as well as non-rubidgeine gorgonopsians included Scylacops, Gorgonops, Lycaenops, and the inostranceviine Inostrancevia africana. Therocephalians present were represented by Theriognathus and Ictidosuchoides, with cynodonts being solely represented by Procynosuchus delaharpeae. Dicynodonts were highly diverse consisting of several genera including Compsodon, Daptocephalus, Dicynodon, Dicynodontoides, Oudenodon bainii, Endothiodon bathystoma, Geikia locusticeps and Rhachiocephalus. Non-synapsid tetrapods included pareiasaurs Anthodon serrarius and Pareiasaurus serridens and the temnospondyl Peltobatrachus.

Rubidgea fossils being recovered at the Usili Formation indicates a biostratigraphic correlation with Late Permian-aged deposits of South Africa. The formation likely correlated to the upper Cistecephalus Assemblage Zone to lower Daptocephalus Assemblage Zone. The depositional environment of the formationw as thought to have been alluvial plain, which had numerous small meandering streams passing through well-vegetated floodplains. The basement of this formation would also have housed a generally high phreatic zone.

=== Daptocephalus Assemblage Zone ===
The lower subzone of the Daptocephalus Assemblage Zone, Dicynodon-Theriognathus subzone, was dated between 255.2 to 253 Ma of the Changhsingian stage. Contemporary gorgonopsians present included rubidgeines Aelurognathus, Dinogorgon, and Clelandina, non-rubidgeine gorgonopsans included Gorgonops, Lycaenops, Arctognathus, and Cyonosaurus. Dicynodonts included Daptocephalus, Dicynodon lacerticeps, Dicynodontoides, Oudenodon bainii, Compsodon, Rhachiocephalus magnus, Aulacephalodon bainii, Basilodon woodwardi, Dinanomodon gilli, and Kitchingamodon crassus. Cynodonts present included Procynosuchus delaharpeae, Cynosaurus suppostus, and Nanictosaurus kitchingi. Therocephalians present in the subzone included the whaitisid Theriognathus, lycideopid Lycideops, ictidosuchid Ictidosuchoides, and akidnognathid Akidnognathus. Non-synapsid tetrapods included sauropsids such as pareiasaurs Nanoparia and Pareiasaurus serridens, millerettids Milleretta, Milleropsis, and Millerosaurus, and the owenettid Owenetta rubidgei. As well as amphibians Laccosaurus watstoni and Rhinesuchus whaitsi. The subzone depositional environment was thought to have been a floodplain with lacustrine conditions due to the lack of pedogenic nodules, as well as laterally extensive varve-like mudstone and sandstone laminations. Rainfall was thought to have been seasonal as channel sandstones demonstrate fluctuating and weaning energy.

== Extinction ==
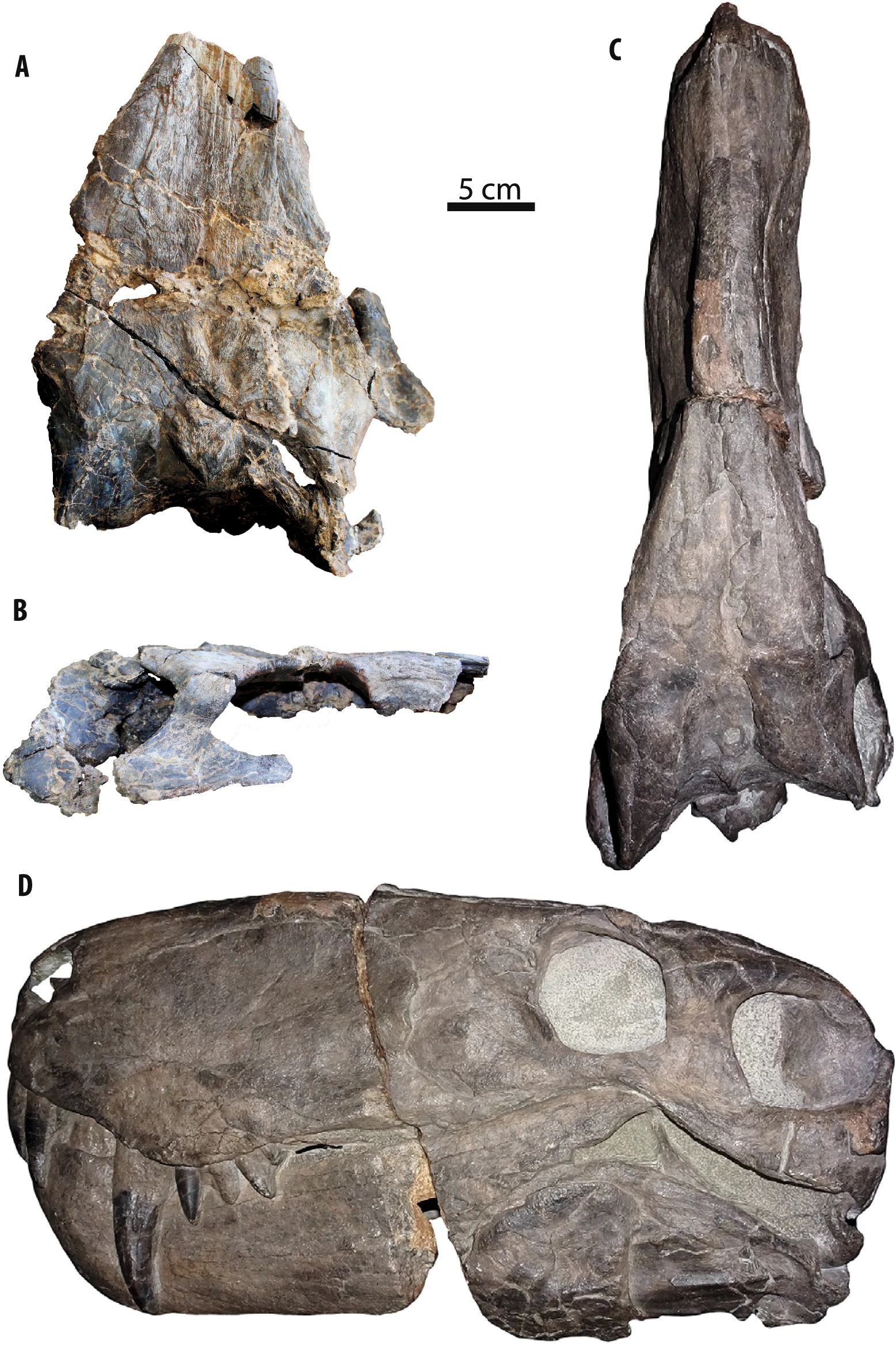
Cranial remains of Inostrancevia africana. Following the turnover event between the lower and subzones of the Daptocephalus AZ, Inostrancevia would replace Rubidgea as the largest predator in Karoo Basin, for the remainder of the Permian.

Most rubidgeines went extinct shortly after the start of the lower Daptocephalus Assemblage Zone, with only Rubidgea persisting. Originally, Rubidgea was thought to have persisted into the Lystrosaurus maccaigi-Moschorhinus subzone, going extinct during the Permian-Triassic extinction event. However, recent analysis by Kammerer et al. (2023) found that the supposed upper Daptocephalus AZ records of Rubidgea to be problematic. RS 19, one of the supposed upper Daptocephalus Assemblage Zone specimens, has four upper incisors (an autapomorphy of Inostrancevia), a narrow skull and the absence of pachyostosis. This may suggest that RS 19 may be another specimen of Inostrancevia africana, although more confirmation is needed. RC 598, another specimen that had been attributed to Rubidgea, showed no signs of being a rubidgeine other than its large size. Its skull has been noted to have been narrower than expected for a rubidgeine, although this could be due to distortion. The youngest reliable record of Rubidgea was TM 2002, from the Ripplemead Member of the Balfour Formation, part of the lower subzone of Daptocephalus AZ. This suggests that Rubidgea went extinct during a turnover event that separated the lower and upper subzones. The turnover event that separated the two subzones was likely due to aridification, which saw the decline of lacustrine floodplains, which were replaced by well-drained floodplains.

This turnover event also saw the extinction of many dicynodonts such as Diictodon feliceps and Aulacephalodon bainii, the gorgonopsian Lyaencops, cynodont Procynosuchus delarharpeae, and the therocephalian Theriognathus. The transition saw the appearance of Lystrosaurus maccaigi, which became increasing abundant following the end of the transition. With its extinction, the apex predator niche would later be filled by the inostranceviine Inostrancevia for the remainder of the Permian.
