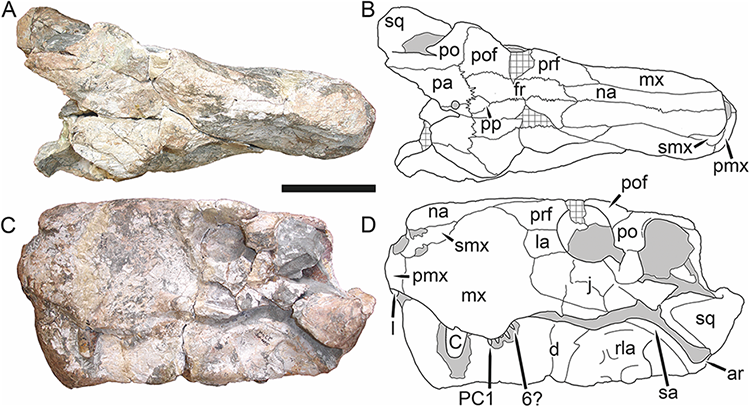
- Holotype skull of A. tigriceps

Scientific classification
- Kingdom: Animalia
- Phylum: Chordata
- Clade: Synapsida
- Clade: Therapsida
- Clade: †Gorgonopsia
- Subfamily: †Rubidgeinae
- Genus: †Aelurognathus; Haughton, 1924

Type species
- †Scymnognathus tigriceps Broom and Haughton, 1913

Synonyms
- Genus-level: Gorgonorhinus Broom, 1937; Leontocephalus Broom, 1940; Prorubidgea Broom, 1940; Tigricephalus Broom, 1948; Species-level: Scymnognathus serratidens Haughton, 1915; Gorgorhinus luckhoffi Broom, 1937; Leontocephalus cadlei Broom, 1940; Prorubidgea maccabei Broom, 1940; Sycosaurus brodiei Broom, 1941; Gorgorhinus minor Broom, 1948; Tigricephalus kingwilli Broom, 1948; Lycaenops alticeps Brink & Kitching, 1953; Prorubidgea brinki Manten, 1959; Aelurognathus broodei Gebauer, 2007

= Aelurognathus =

Aelurognathus Temporal range: Late Permian (Wuchiapingian to Changhsingian), 258–254 Ma

Extinct genus of therapsids

Aelurognathus is an extinct genus of gorgonopsian therapsids from the Permian of South Africa and Zambia.

== Taxonomy ==
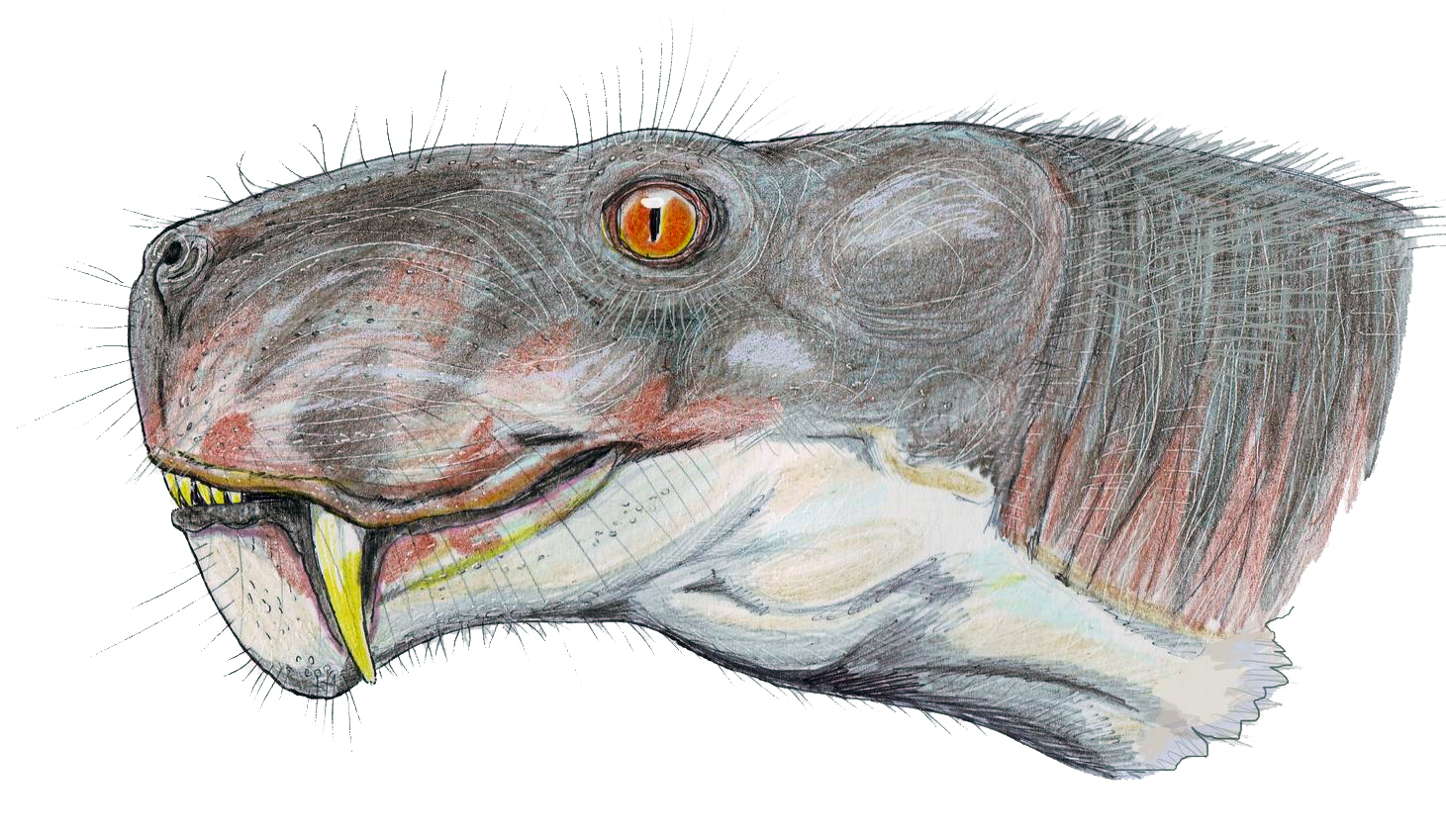
A. tigriceps restoration

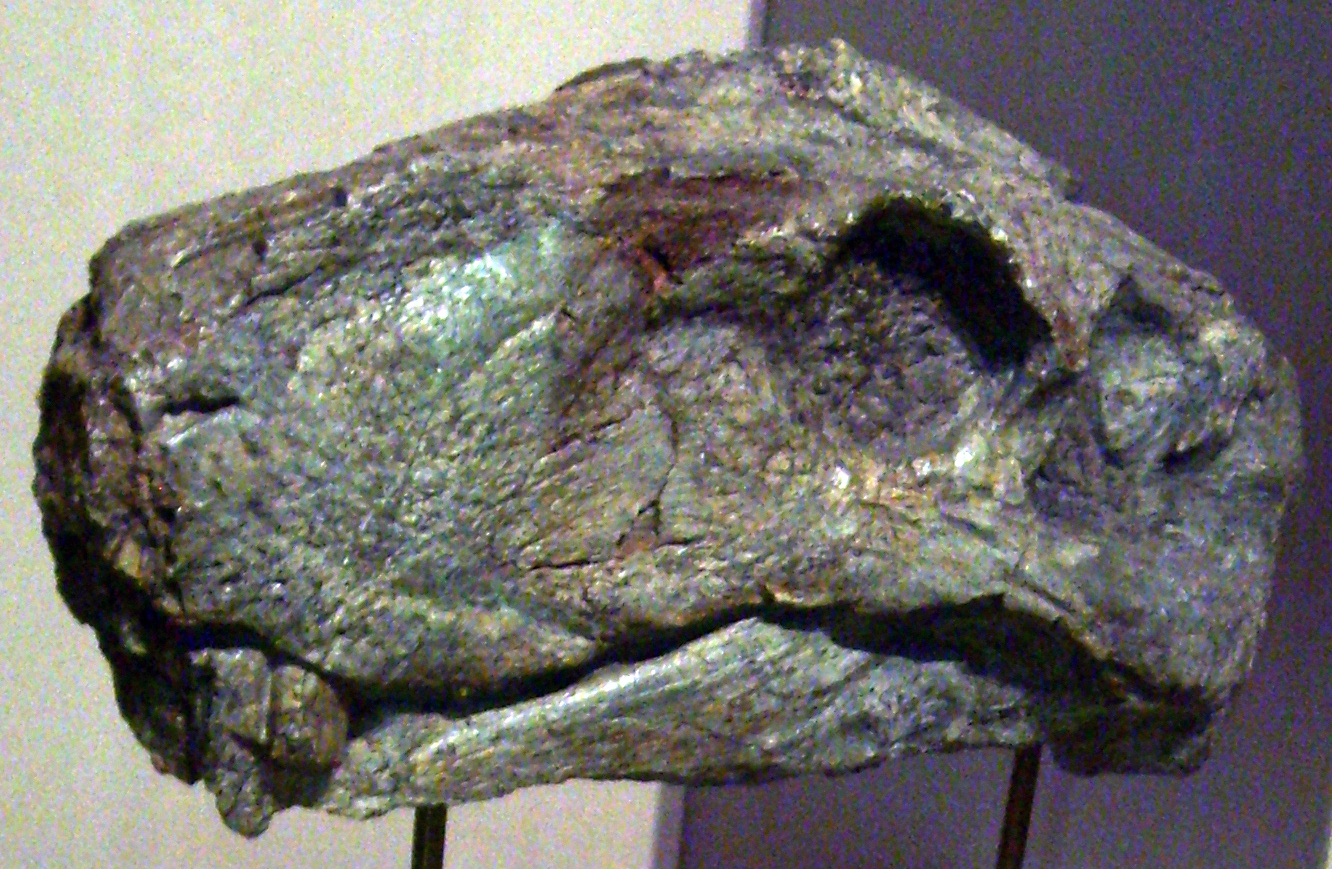
A. sp. skull at the Museum für Naturkunde, Berlin

The type species is Aelurognathus tigriceps, originally named Scymnognathus tigriceps by South African paleontologists Robert Broom and Sydney H. Haughton in 1913, and later assigned to the new genus Aelurognathus by Haughton in 1924.

Scymnognathus parringtoni von Huene, 1950, previously assigned to Aelurognathus, is now classified as a species of Sauroctonus. Aelurognathus nyasaensis Haughton, 1926 is not referable to the genus.

=== Classification ===
Below is a cladogram from the phylogenetic analysis of Gebauer (2007):

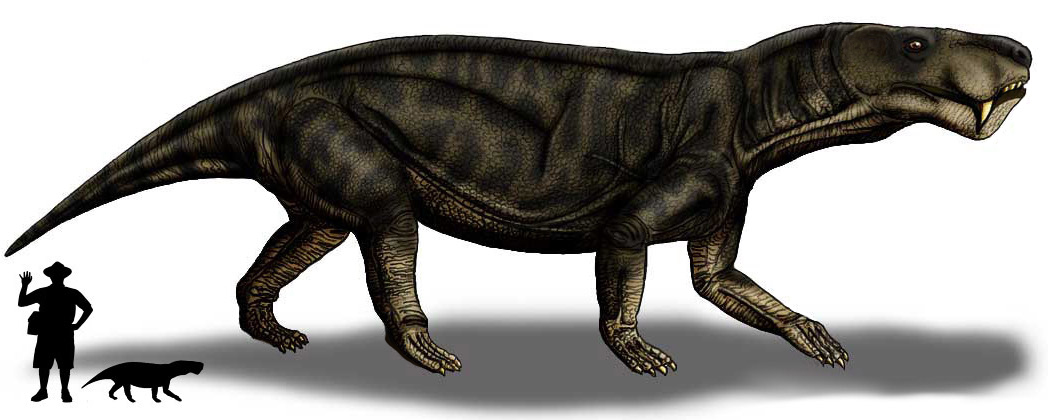
Restoration

- Gorgonopsia
  - Aloposaurus
  - - Cyonosaurus
    - - Aelurosaurus
      - Gorgonopsidae
        - Scylacognathus
        - - Eoarctops
          - Gorgonops
          - - Njalila
            - - Lycaenops
              - - Arctognathus
                - - Inostrancevia
                  - Rubidgeinae
                    - Aelurognathus
                    - - Rubidgea
                      - - Sycosaurus
                        - Clelandina

Cladogram of Rubidgeinae recovered by Kammerer (2016):

- Rubidgeinae
  - Smilesaurus ferox
  - - Aelurognathus tigriceps
    - - Ruhuhucerberus haughtoni
      - - - Sycosaurus laticeps
          - Sycosaurus nowaki
        - Rubidgeini
          - Leontosaurus vanderhosti
          - - Dinogorgon rubidgei
            - - Rubidgea atrox
              - Clelandina rubidgei

== Palaeobiology ==
A broken tooth beside the skeleton of a dicynodont from the Tropidostoma Assemblage Zone has been attributed to Aelurognathus, indicating that it scavenged. The bones of the back of the skeleton are the most scattered, suggesting that the Aelurognathus individuals fed on the rear of the carcass, removing the hind limbs to reach the soft underside. The small incisor teeth of Aelurognathus indicate that it was not able to crush bone but more likely stripped flesh from its prey like the modern-day wild dog Lycaon pictus. Bite marks on the bones of the skeleton were unlikely to have been made by Aelurognathus and may be an indication that another predator killed the dicynodont.

In 2026, a paper by Pevsner et al. described postcranial remains - as well as an additional skull - belonging to Aelurognathus, from the Daptocephalus Assemblage zone in the Karoo Basin. The material includes a near-complete series of dorsal vertebrae and ribs, complete pelvic girdle, hind limbs, feet, and a nearly complete tail. Notably, the tail of Aelurognathus is proportionally longer than in any other gorgonopsian known thus far. The specimen may represent an immature individual, based on the incomplete fusion of the cuboid, as well as its smaller size when compared with the holotype individual.
