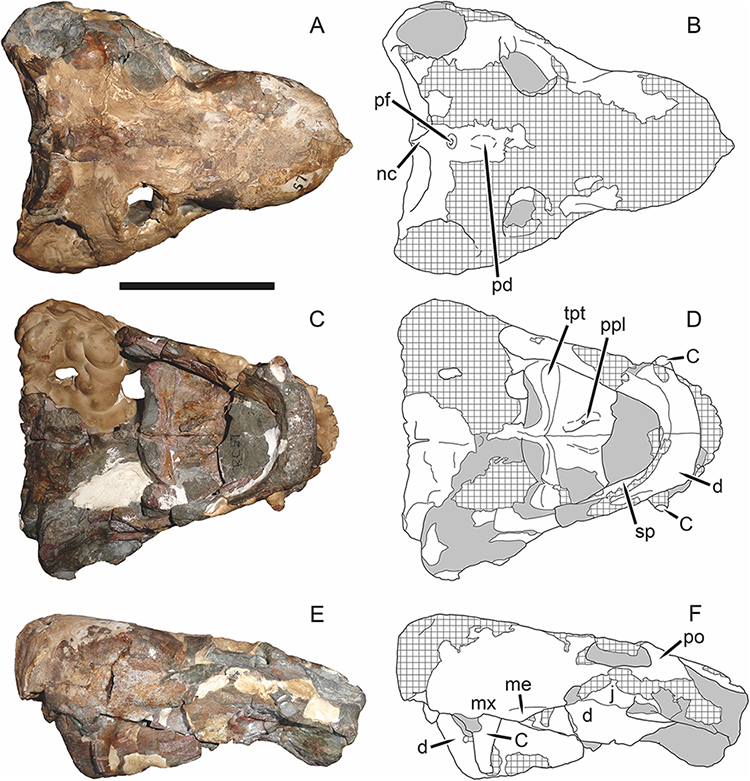
- Holotype skull of C. rubidgei

Scientific classification
- Kingdom: Animalia
- Phylum: Chordata
- Clade: Synapsida
- Clade: Therapsida
- Clade: †Gorgonopsia
- Family: †Gorgonopsidae
- Tribe: †Rubidgeini
- Genus: †Clelandina; Broom, 1948

Type species
- Clelandina rubidgei Broom, 1948

Synonyms
- Genus-level: Tigrisaurus Broom & George, 1950; Dragocephalus Brink & Kitching, 1953; Species-level: Clelandina major Broom, 1940; Tigrisaurus pricei Broom & George, 1950; Dracocephalus scheepersi Brink & Kitching, 1953; Dinogorgon (Dracocephalus) scheepersi Watson & Romer, 1956; Clelandina scheepersi Sigogneau, 1970; Dinogorgon pricei Sigogneau, 1970; Rubidgea pricei Gebauer, 2007

= Clelandina =

Clelandina Temporal range: Late Permian 259–254 Ma

Extinct genus of therapsids

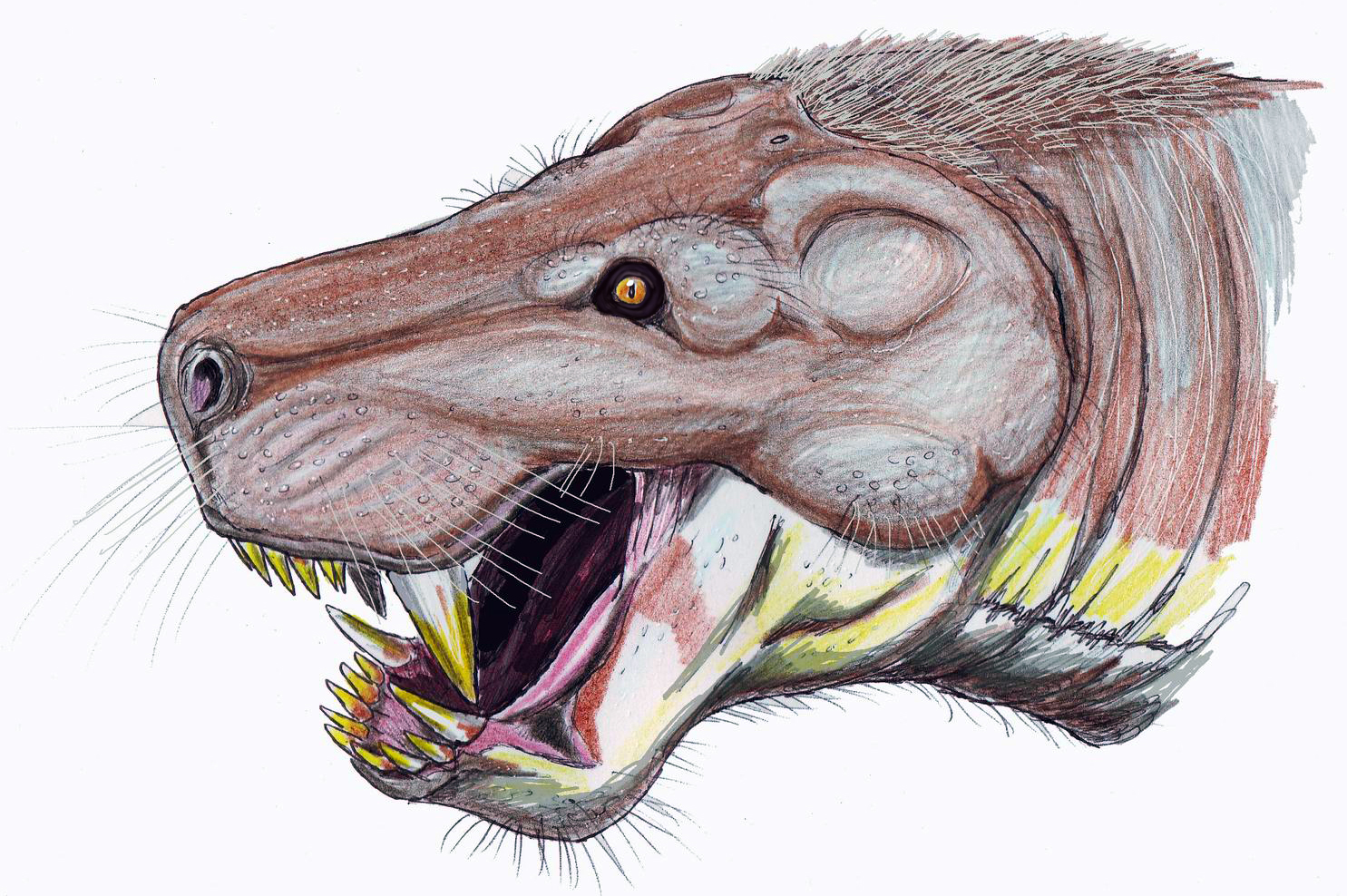
Restoration of C. rubidgei

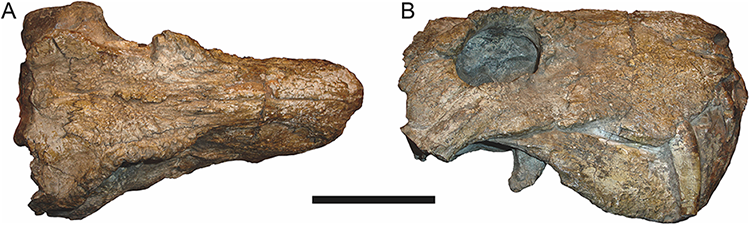
Referred skull, the holotype of Tigrisaurus pricei

Clelandina is an extinct genus of rubidgeine gorgonopsian from the Late Permian of Cistecephalus Assemblage Zone of South Africa. It was first named by Broom in 1948. The type and only species is C. rubidgei. It is relatively rare, with only four known specimens.

== Description ==
Clelandina rubidgei has an extraordinarily small scleral ring relative to the size of its orbit, which implies that it was diurnal. It is the only rubidgeine with a preserved scleral ring, so it is unknown whether this trait was shared by other members of the subfamily. Like all rubidgeines, it was relatively large, with a skull up to 36 cm long. It had reduced dentition, with the teeth posterior to the canines being absent and replaced with a bony ridge. The skull has heavily pachyostosed, with massive rugose bosses.

== Classification ==
Clelandina shares many characteristics with the contemporary Rubidgea, and is currently recognized as the sister taxon of this genus. Together with Dinogorgon and Leontosaurus, these genera form Rubidgeini, a clade of large gorgonopsians with distinctively robust, broad, and pachyostosed skulls.

Below is a cladogram recovered by Christian Kammerer in 2016.

- Rubidgeinae
  - Smilesaurus ferox
  - - Aelurognathus tigriceps
    - - Ruhuhucerberus haughtoni
      - - - Sycosaurus laticeps
          - Sycosaurus nowaki
        - Rubidgeini
          - Leontosaurus vanderhosti
          - - Dinogorgon rubidgei
            - - Rubidgea atrox
              - Clelandina rubidgei

== See also ==
- List of therapsids
