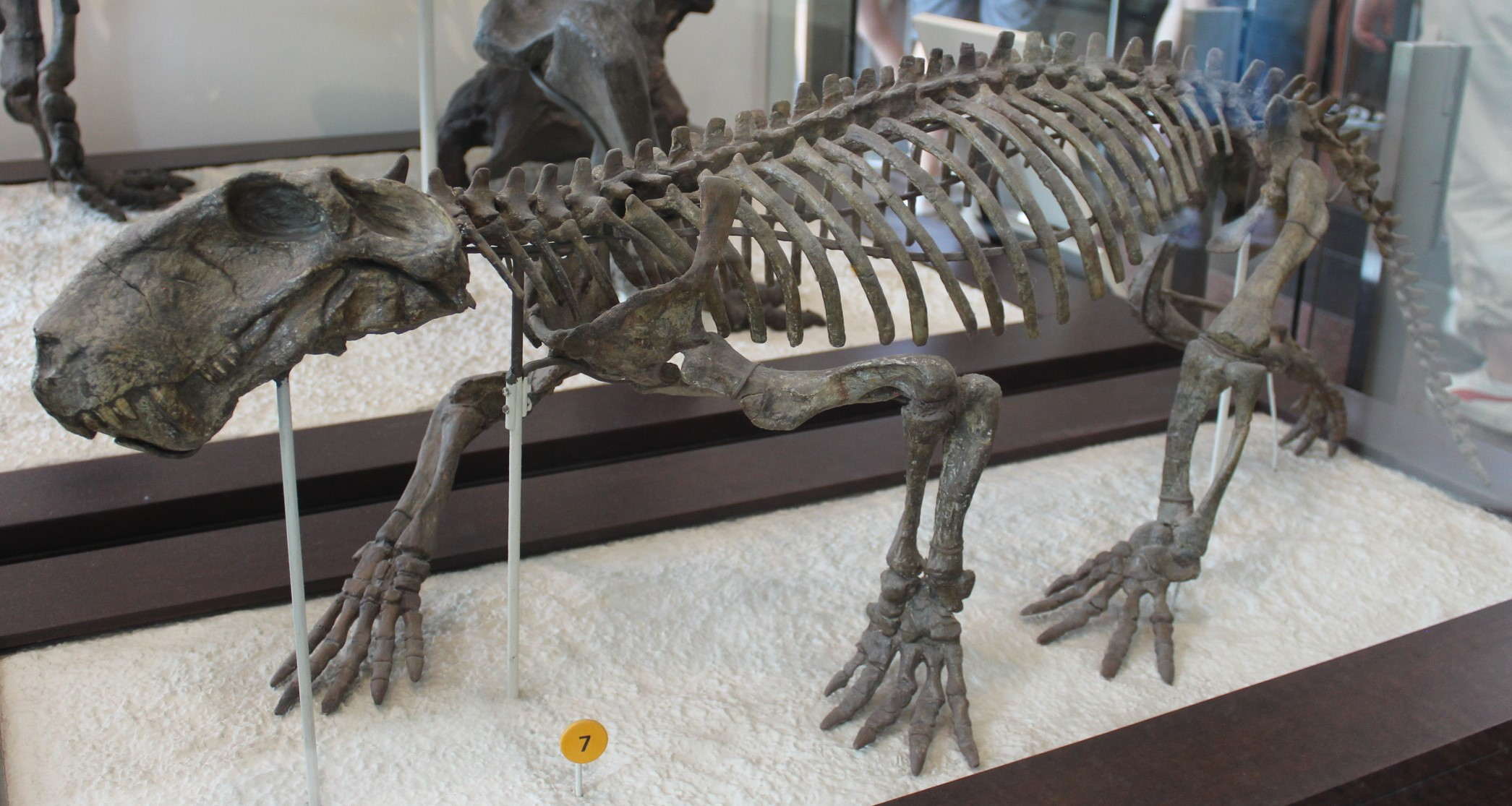
- L. ornatus skeleton, American Museum of Natural History

Scientific classification
- Kingdom: Animalia
- Phylum: Chordata
- Clade: Synapsida
- Clade: Therapsida
- Clade: †Gorgonopsia
- Genus: †Lycaenops; Broom, 1925

Type species
- Lycaenops ornatus Broom, 1925

Species
- †L. ornatus Broom, 1925; †L. angusticeps Broom, 1913; †L. microdon Boonstra, 1934; †L. sollasi Broili and Schröder, 1935

Synonyms
- Lycaenoides Broom, 1925; Aelurognathus microdon Boonstra, 1934; Aelurognathus sollasi Broili and Schröder, 1935; Scymnognathus angusticeps Broom, 1913

= Lycaenops =

Lycaenops Temporal range: Late Permian (Wuchiapingian to Changhsingian) c. 257–253 Ma,

Extinct genus of therapsids

Lycaenops ("wolf-face") is a genus of carnivorous therapsids. It lived during the Late Permian, about 257 to 253 Ma, in what is now South Africa.

== Description ==
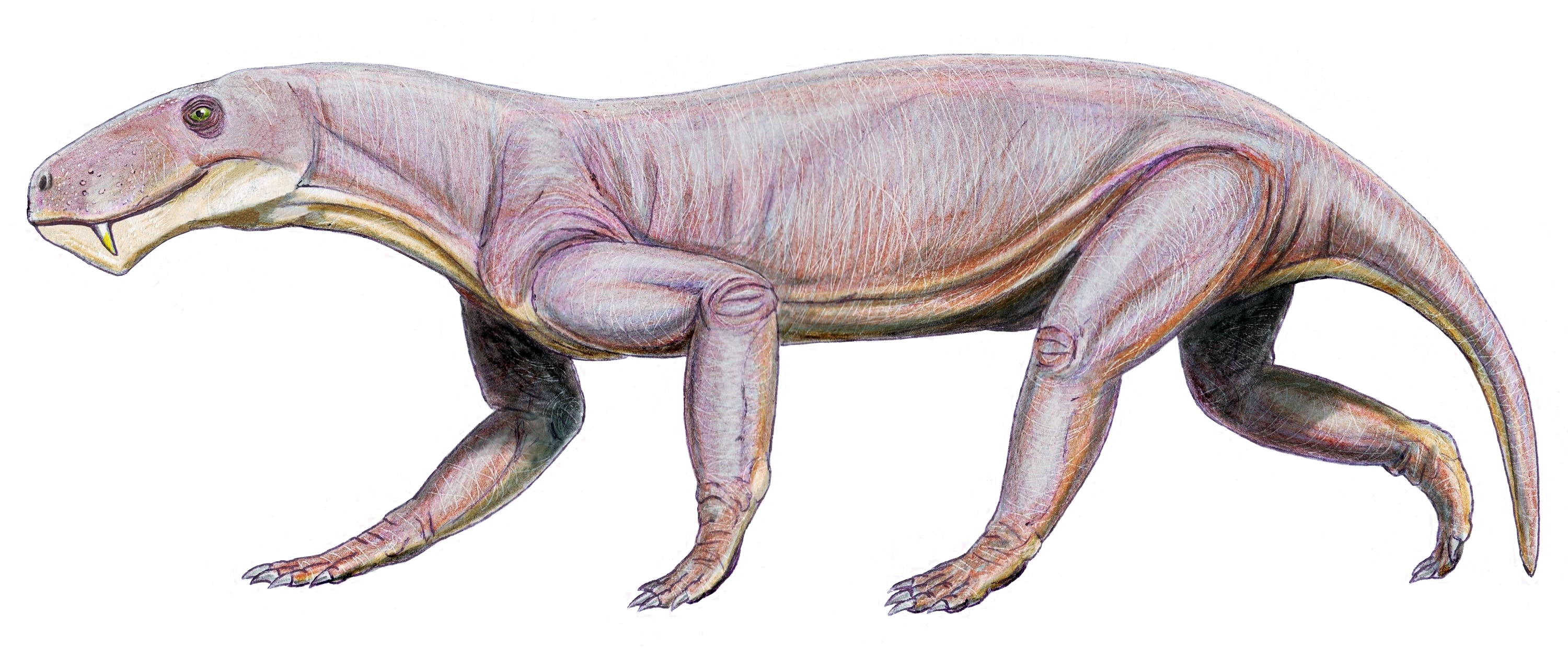
Reconstruction of L. ornatus

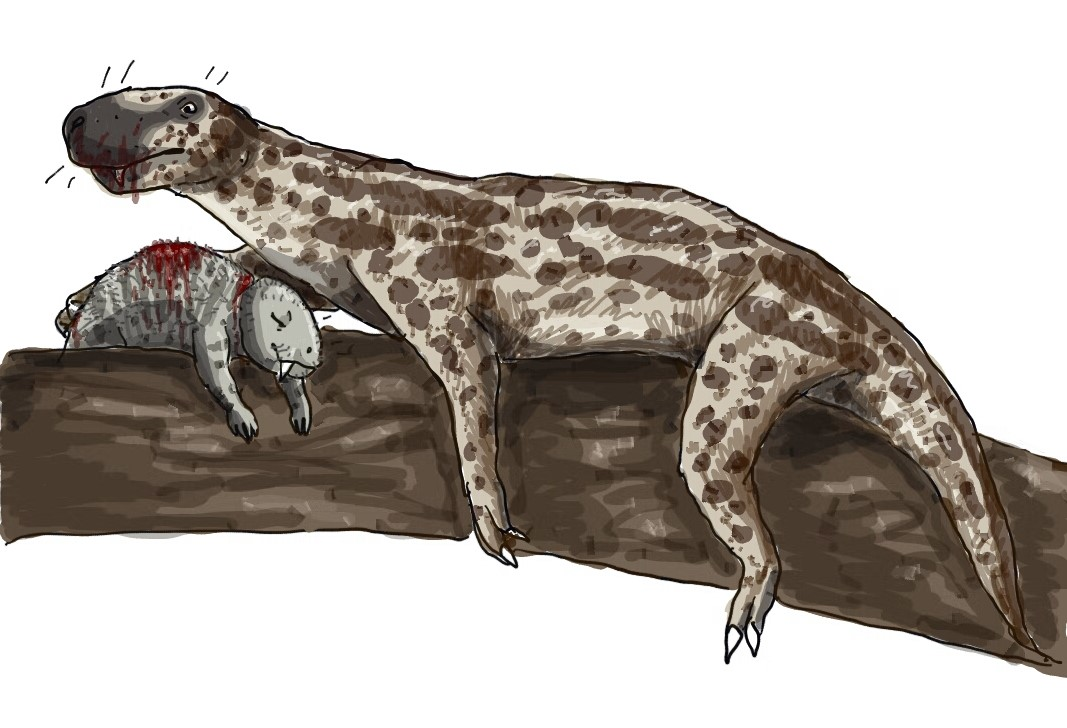
Life restoration with dicynodont prey and speculative hair

Like the modern-day wolves from which it took its name, Lycaenops had a long and slender skull, with dog-like fangs set into its upper and lower jaws. These pointed canine teeth were ideal for stabbing and/or tearing at the flesh of any large prey that it came upon. Lycaenops most likely hunted small vertebrates such as reptiles and dicynodonts.

Lycaenops walked and ran with its long legs held close to its body. This feature is found in mammals but not in more primitive amniotes, early reptiles, and synapsids such as pelycosaurs, whose legs are positioned to the sides of their bodies. The ability to move like a mammal would have given Lycaenops an advantage over other land vertebrates since it would have been able to outrun them.

== Species ==
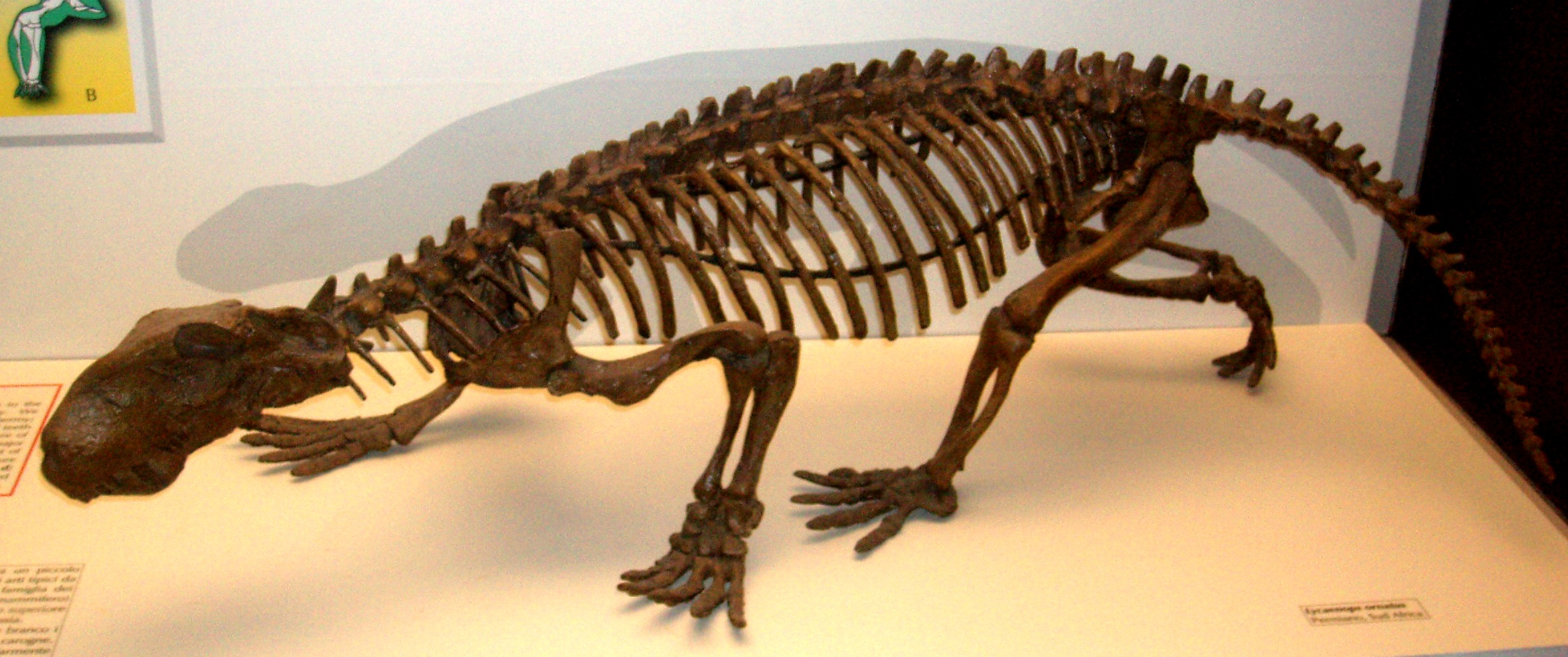
A Lycaenops skeleton in the Milan Natural History Museum

The type species Lycaenops ornatus was named by South African paleontologist Robert Broom in 1925.

Several other species have also been referred to the genus, including L. angusticeps, which was originally named Scymnognathus angusticeps. It is currently considered a valid taxon.

Several other specimens have been referred to as Lycaenops but are no longer included within this genus. This includes:

- L. kingwilli, which was originally named Tigricephalus kingwilli, is now placed in the genus Aelurognathus.
- L. tenuirostris, which was originally named Tangagorgon tenuirostris, is now in the genus Cyonosaurus.
- Two additional species, L. microdon and L. sollasi, were added to Lycaenops after being classified as Aelurognathus species. The species L. minor is now considered a synonym of L. sollasi.

== Classification ==
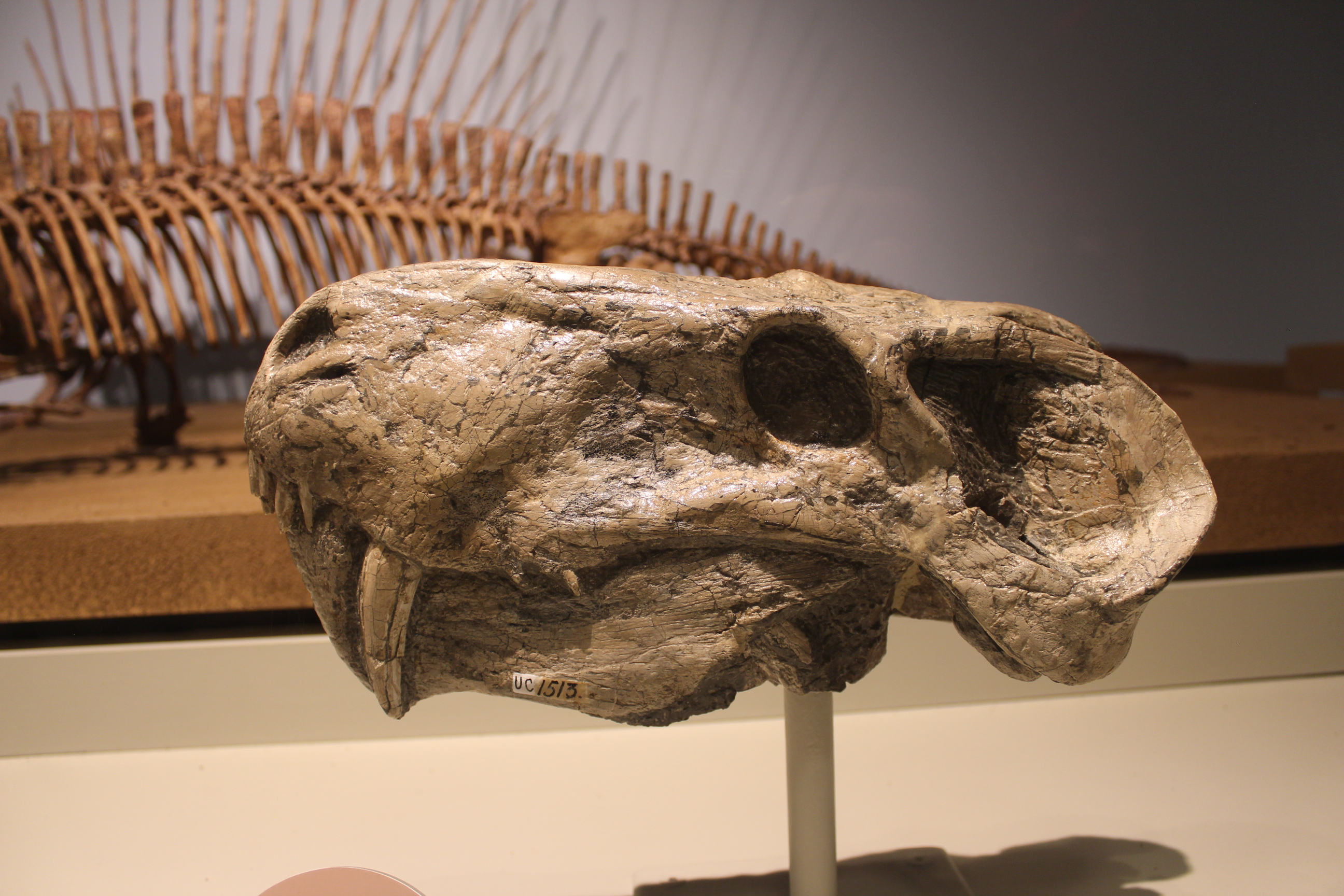
Skull of L. cf. angusticeps at the Field Museum of Natural History, Chicago

Below is a cladogram from the phylogenetic analysis of Gebauer (2007):

- Gorgonopsia
  - Aloposaurus
  - - Cyonosaurus
    - - Aelurosaurus
      - Gorgonopsidae
        - Scylacognathus
        - - Eoarctops
          - Gorgonops
          - - Njalila
            - - Lycaenops
              - - Arctognathus
                - - Inostrancevia
                  - Rubidgeinae
                    - Aelurognathus
                    - - Rubidgea
                      - - Sycosaurus
                        - Clelandina

== See also ==
- Evolution of mammals
- List of therapsids
- Gorgonops
