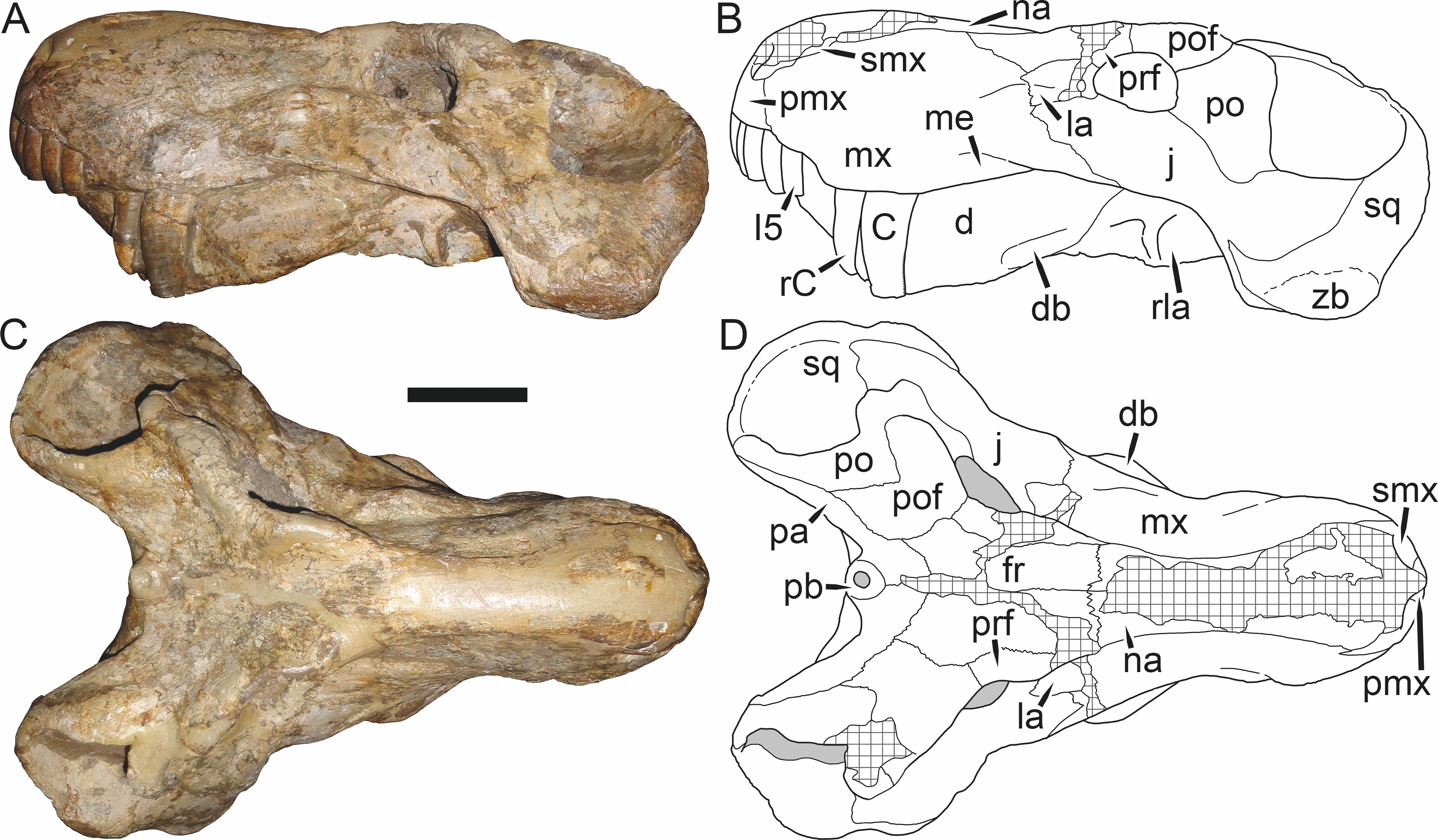
- Skull of Rubidgea atrox holotype (RC 13)

Scientific classification
- Kingdom: Animalia
- Phylum: Chordata
- Clade: Synapsida
- Clade: Therapsida
- Clade: †Gorgonopsia
- Subfamily: †Rubidgeinae; Broom, 1938

Genera
- †Aelurognathus; †Sycosaurus; †Ruhuhucerberus; †Rubidgeini; †Clelandina; †Dinogorgon; †Leontosaurus; †Rubidgea

= Rubidgeinae =

Rubidgeinae Temporal range: Late Permian 258–253.48 Ma

Extinct subfamily of therapsids

Rubidgeinae is a subfamily of gorgonopians that were endemic to Africa, during the Late Permian. They were among the largest gorgonopsians, and their fossils are common in the Cistecephalus and Daptocephalus assemblage zones of the Karoo Basin. Rubidgeines went extinct near the end of the Permian following a turnover event.

== Classification and systematics ==
Initially, the clade consisted of thirty six nominal species, however the number has been reduced over the recent years, with Kammerer (2016) recovering nine valid species within the clade.

Cladogram recovered by Kammerer (2016).

- Rubidgeinae
  - Smilesaurus ferox
  - - Aelurognathus tigriceps
    - - Ruhuhucerberus haughtoni
      - - - Sycosaurus laticeps
          - Sycosaurus nowaki
        - Rubidgeini
          - Leontosaurus vanderhosti
          - - Dinogorgon rubidgei
            - - Rubidgea atrox
              - Clelandina rubidgei

== Description ==
Rubidgeines were large, quadrupedal carnivores of the family Gorgonopsidae, which was part larger clade Their largest teeth are their upper canines, which were blade-like and had well-developed serrations. Their postcanine teeth were small and conical, but were also frequently serrated. Tooth replacement was rapid relative to basal therocephalians. Rubidgeines can be distinguished from other gorgonopsians by the absence of a blade-like parasphenoid bone and reduced or absent preparietal bone. The jugal bone, while narrow in most gorgonopsians, was often broadly expanded in rubidgeines. The largest rubidgeines were Dinogorgon and Rubidgea, with the latter having skulls measuring 47.5 cm (18.7 in).

== Paleobiology ==
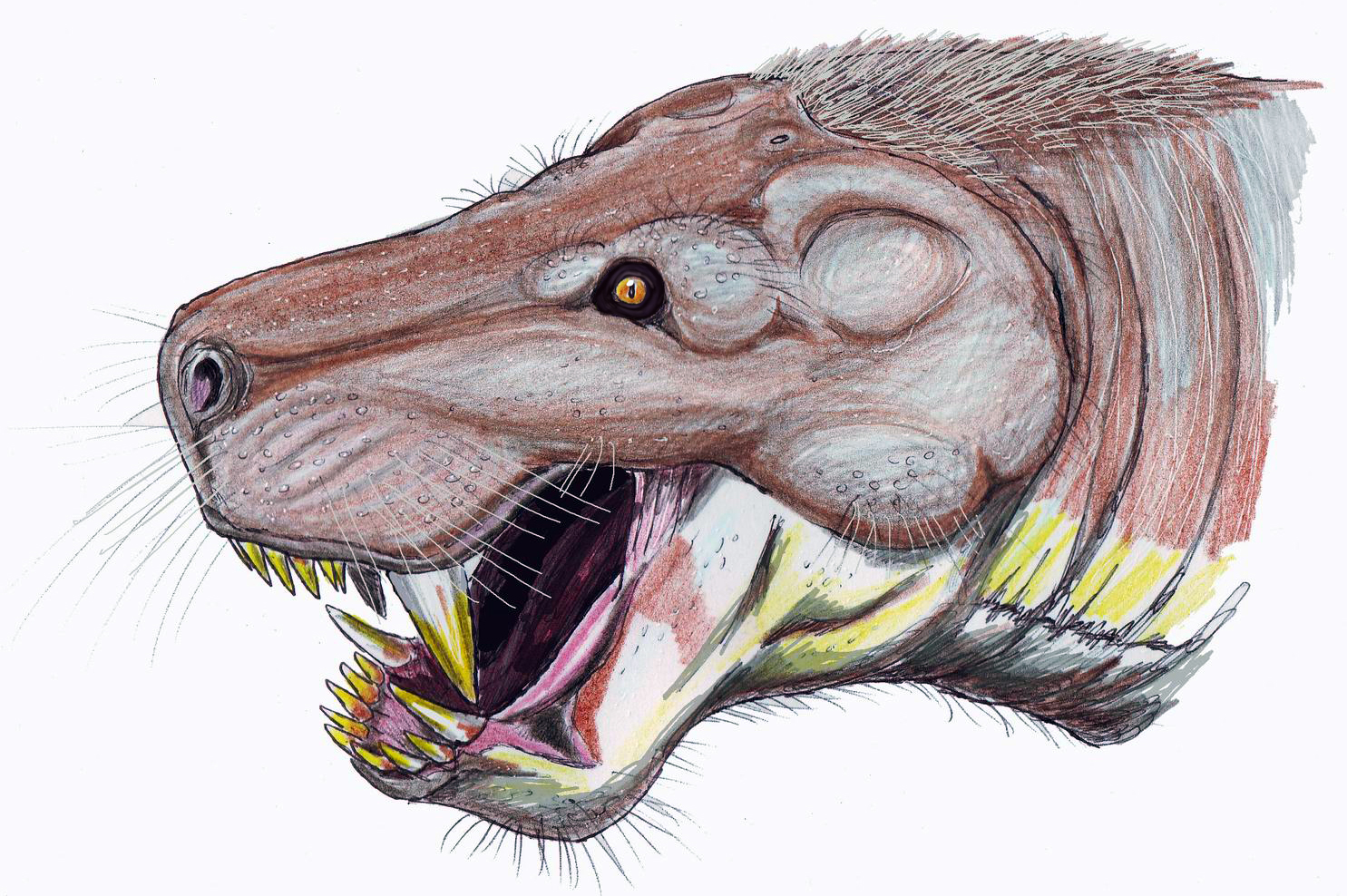
Clelandina rubidgei

Rubidgeines were among the largest gorgonopsians known, and the largest known from Africa. They were also the largest predators in their environment. Their massive canines and serrated teeth indicate that they were adapted for macropredation. The robust skull roof and supraorbital bosses of rubidgeines likely acted to protect the skull from the stress inflicted during prey capture, and similar morphology has been seen in many other macropredators in the fossil record, including theropod dinosaurs. The presence of this skull morphology is one of multiple adaptations seen in predators that utilize the skull, rather than the limbs, in prey capture.
