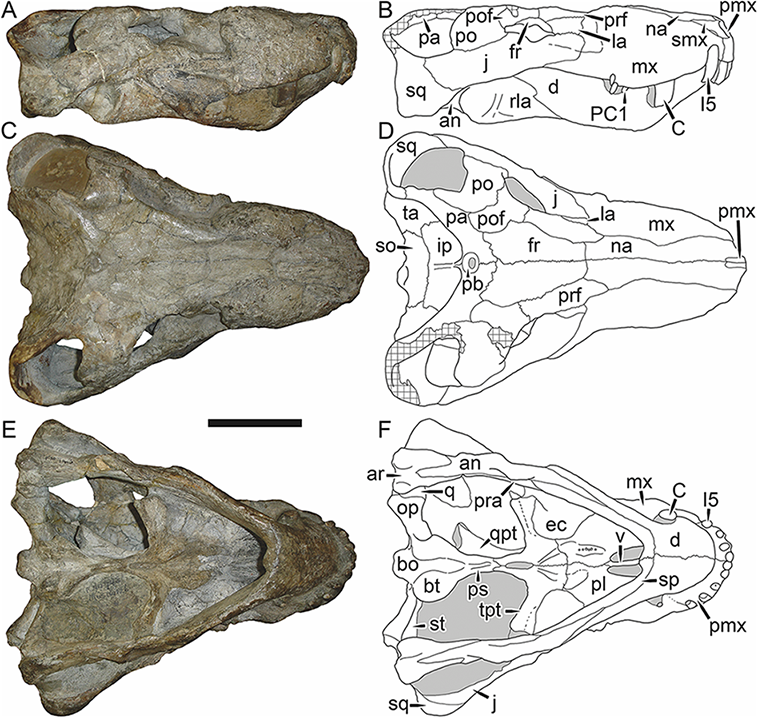
- Holotype skull

Scientific classification
- Kingdom: Animalia
- Phylum: Chordata
- Clade: Synapsida
- Clade: Therapsida
- Clade: †Gorgonopsia
- Family: †Gorgonopsidae
- Tribe: †Rubidgeini
- Genus: †Leontosaurus

Type species
- Leontosaurus vanderhorsti Broom & George 1950

Synonyms
- Rubidgea platyrhina Brink & Kitching 1953; Sycosaurus vanderhorsti Sigogneau 1970

= Leontosaurus =

Leontosaurus Temporal range: Late Permian

Extinct genus of non-mammalian synapsids from South Africa

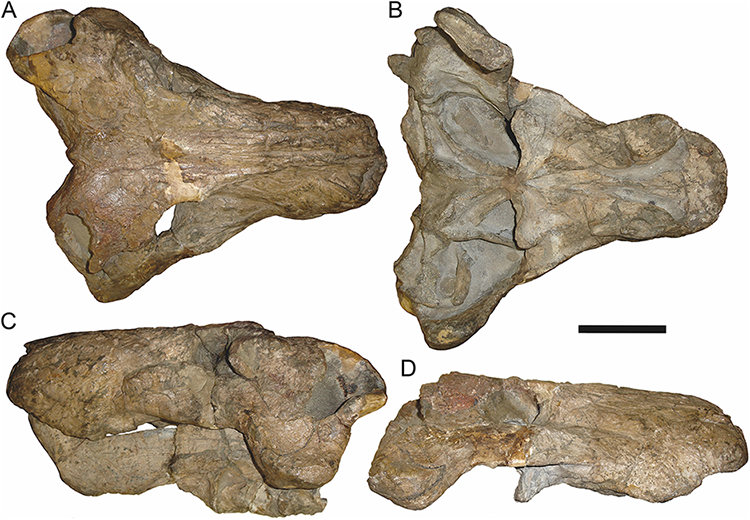
Referred skull, the holotype of Rubidgea platyrhina

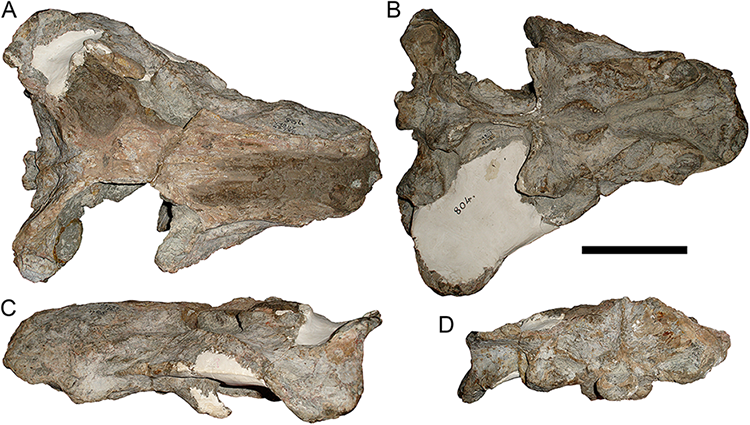
Referred skull

Leontosaurus is an extinct genus of non-mammalian synapsids from the Dicynodon Assemblage Zone, Balfour Formation of South Africa. It contains the single species L. vanderhorsti.

== See also ==
- List of synapsids
