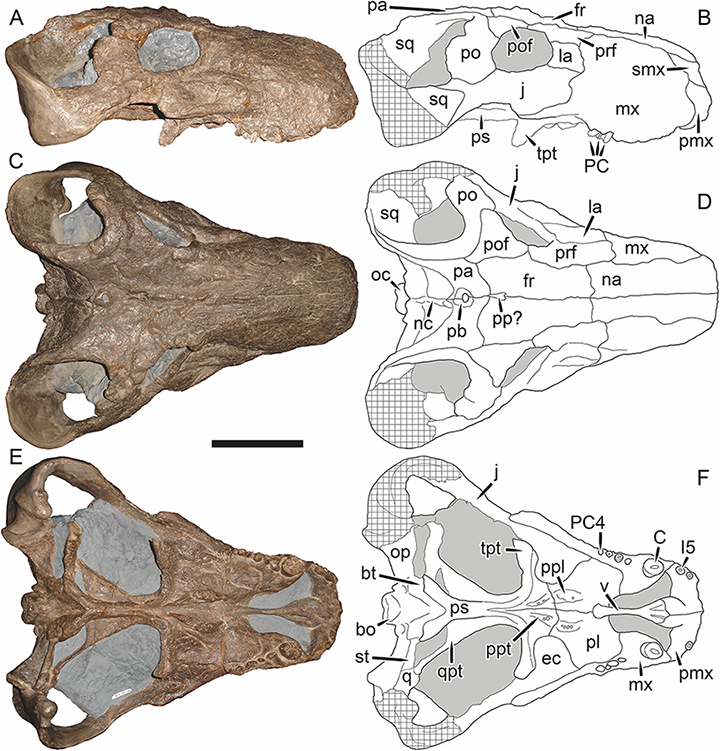
- Holotype skull

Scientific classification
- Kingdom: Animalia
- Phylum: Chordata
- Clade: Synapsida
- Clade: Therapsida
- Clade: †Gorgonopsia
- Family: †Gorgonopsidae
- Subfamily: †Rubidgeinae
- Genus: †Ruhuhucerberus; Maisch 2002

Type species
- †Ruhuhucerberus haughtoni (Huene 1950)

Synonyms
- Aelurognathus haughtoni Huene 1950; Leontocephalus haughtoni Sigogneau 1970; Ruhuhucerberus terror Maisch 2002; Sycosaurus terror Gebauer 2007

= Ruhuhucerberus =

Ruhuhucerberus Temporal range: Late Permian

Extinct genus of therapsids

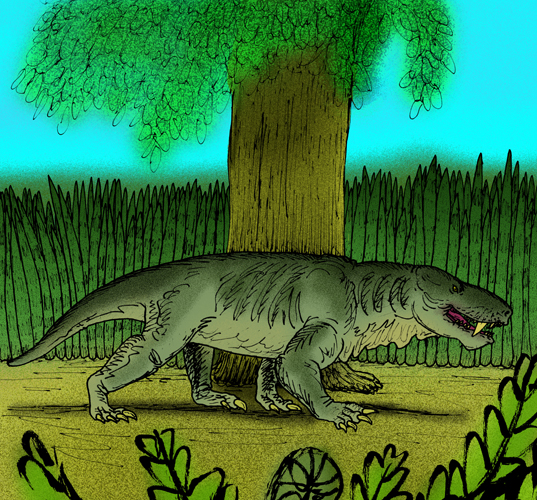
Artist's reconstruction of R. haughtoni

Ruhuhucerberus is a genus of very large, extinct gorgonopsian therapsids which existed in Tanzania during the Late Permian. Its fossils are found in the Penman Kawinga Formation of the Ruhuhu Basin. It existed sympatrically with the even larger Rubidgea.
