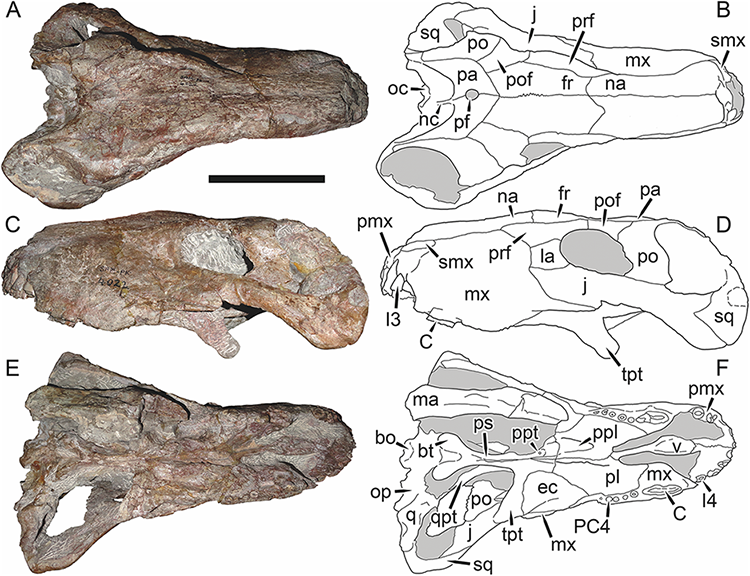
- Holotype skull of S. laticeps

Scientific classification
- Kingdom: Animalia
- Phylum: Chordata
- Clade: Synapsida
- Clade: Therapsida
- Clade: †Gorgonopsia
- Subfamily: †Rubidgeinae
- Genus: †Sycosaurus; Haughton, 1924

Type species
- Sycosaurus laticeps Haughton, 1924

Species
- †S. laticeps Haughton, 1924; †S. nowaki Broili & Schröder, 1936

Synonyms
- Genus-level: Tetraodon Broili & Schröder, 1936; Tetradontonius Kuhn, 1961; Cephalicustriodus Parrington, 1974; S. nowaki: Tetraodon nowaki Broili & Schröder, 1936; Lycaenops kingoriensis Huene, 1950; Tetraodontonius nowaki Kuhn, 1961; Leontocephalus intactus Kemp, 1969

= Sycosaurus =

Sycosaurus Temporal range: Late Permian (Wuchiapingian) c.256–255.24 Ma

Extinct genus of therapsids

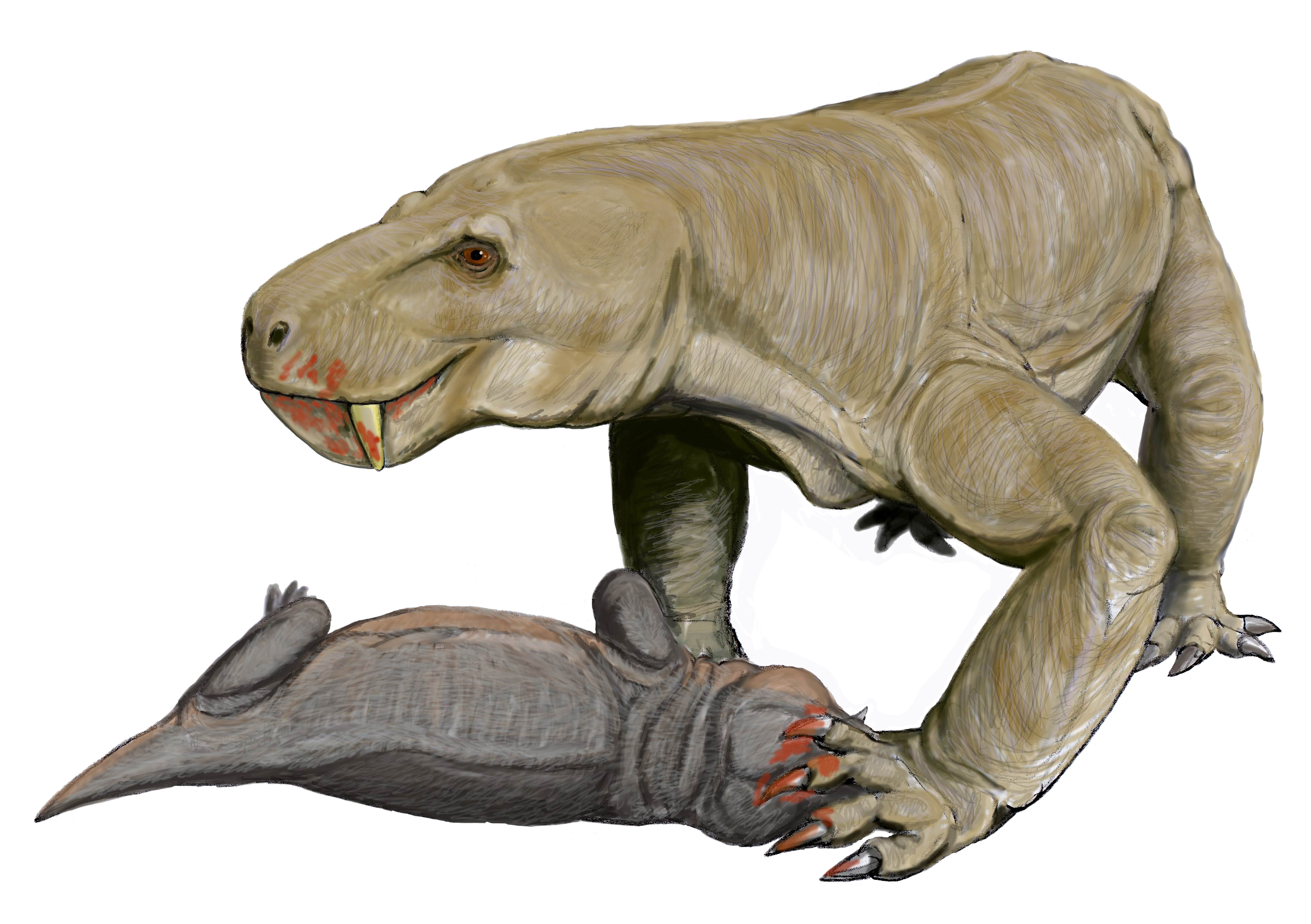
Restoration of S. laticeps with prey

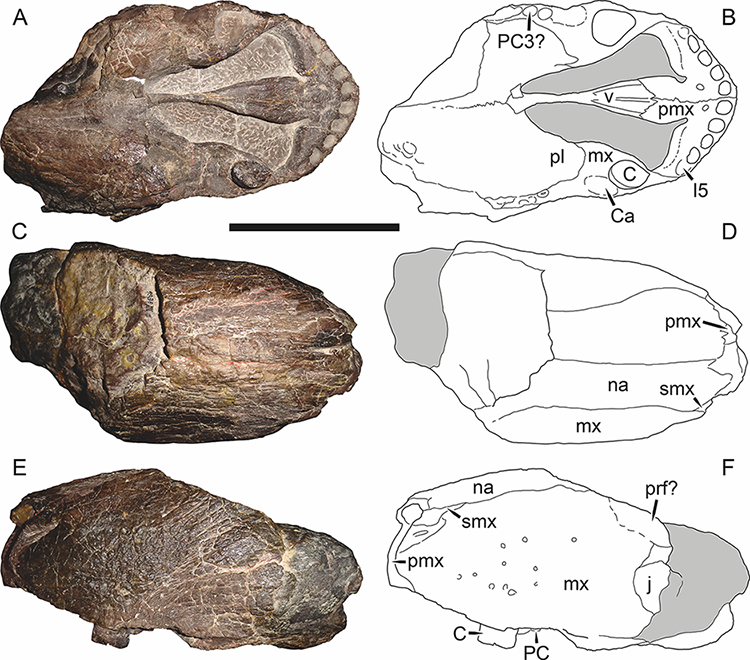
Holotype of S. nowaki

Sycosaurus is an extinct genus of rubidgeine gorgonopsians from the Wuchiapingian (Upper Permian) Cistecephalus zone of South Africa. It was medium-sized, about 1.2 m in length. It was first named by Haughton in 1924, and contains two species, S. laticeps and S. nowaki.
