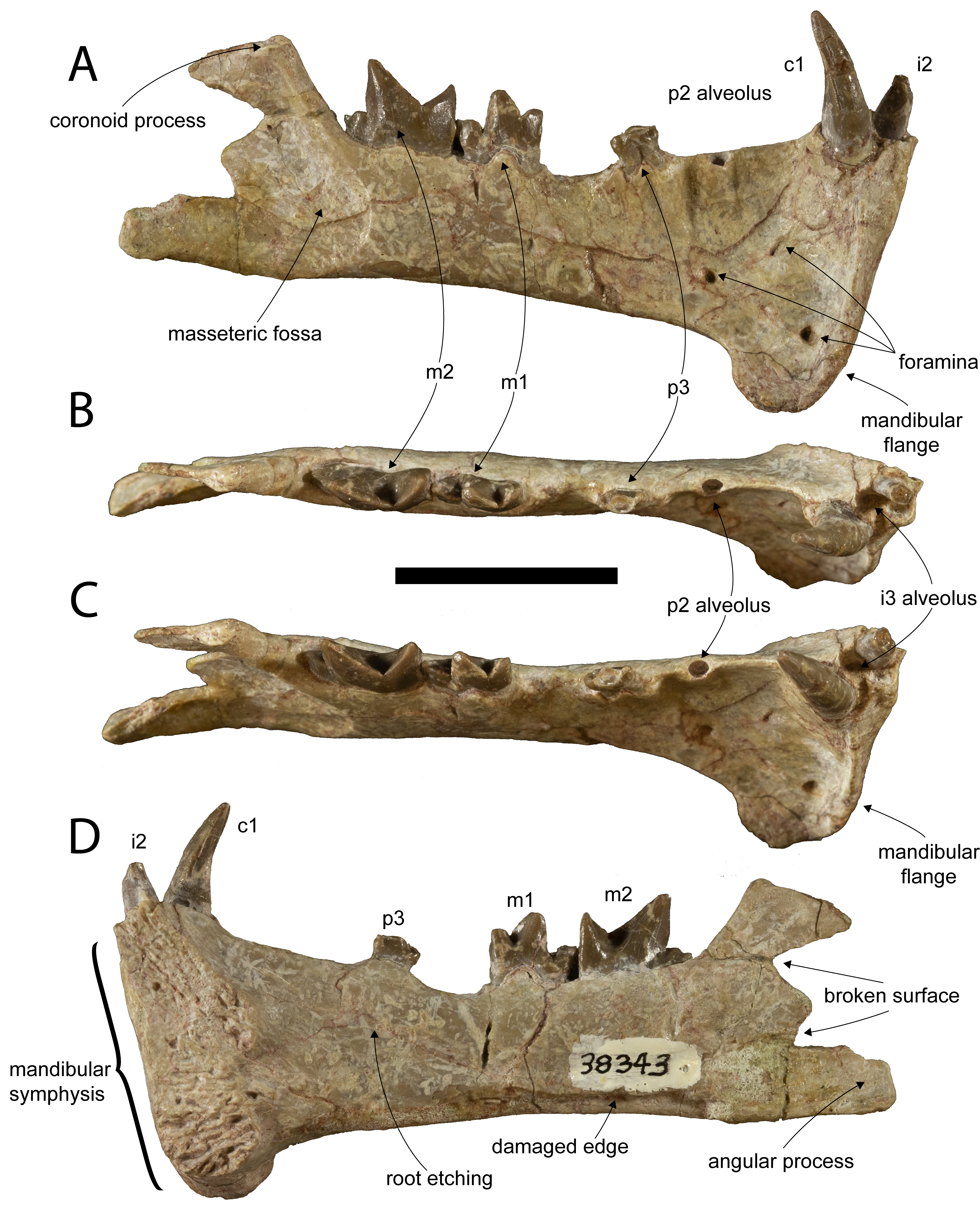
- Holotype of Diegoaelurus vanvalkenburghae, (SDSNH 38343)

Scientific classification
- Kingdom: Animalia
- Phylum: Chordata
- Class: Mammalia
- Order: †Oxyaenodonta
- Family: †Oxyaenidae
- Subfamily: †Machaeroidinae
- Genus: †Diegoaelurus; Zack, Poust, & Wagner, 2022

Type species
- Diegoaelurus vanvalkenburghae Zack, Poust, & Wagner, 2022
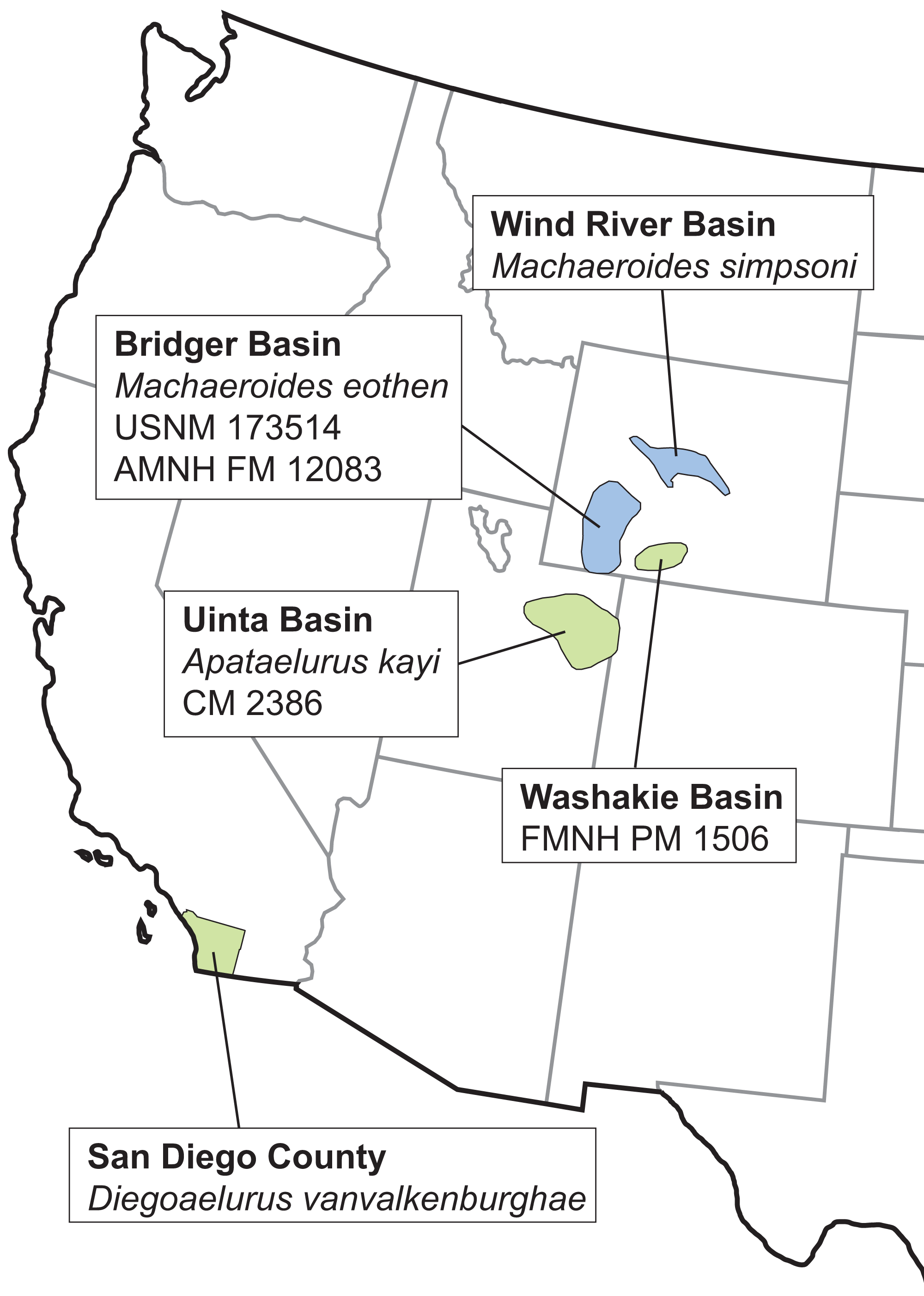
- A map showing the fossil finds of D. vanvalkenburghae as well as other machaeroidinid genera.

= Diegoaelurus =

Diegoaelurus Temporal range: Middle Eocene (Uintan) 43–42 Ma

Extinct genus of mammal

Diegoaelurus ("San Diego's cat") is an extinct genus of placental mammals from the extinct subfamily Machaeroidinae within the extinct family Oxyaenidae. This genus contains only one species, Diegoaelurus vanvalkenburghae, which was found in the Santiago Formation in California. This mammal lived during the Uintan stage of the Middle Eocene Epoch around 43 to 42 million years ago.

== Etymology ==
The name of genus Diegoaelurus comes from the city of San Diego and from Ancient Greek αἴλουρος (aílouros-) 'cat'. Diegoaelurus vanvalkenburghae was named after Dr. Blaire Van Valkenburgh in honor of her research on carnivorous mammals and saber-toothed predator paleoecology.

== Discovery ==
The holotype fossils were discovered in Oceanside, San Diego county by paleontologist Brad Riney in 1988. The fossils were housed for over three decades in a museum until 2022, when the fossils were described and recognised as a new genus and species. This creature is so far the only North American species of Machaeroidinae known outside of Utah and Wyoming. According to a paper on the creature, ''The present study highlights how poorly documented the machaeroidine fossil record remains''.

== Description ==
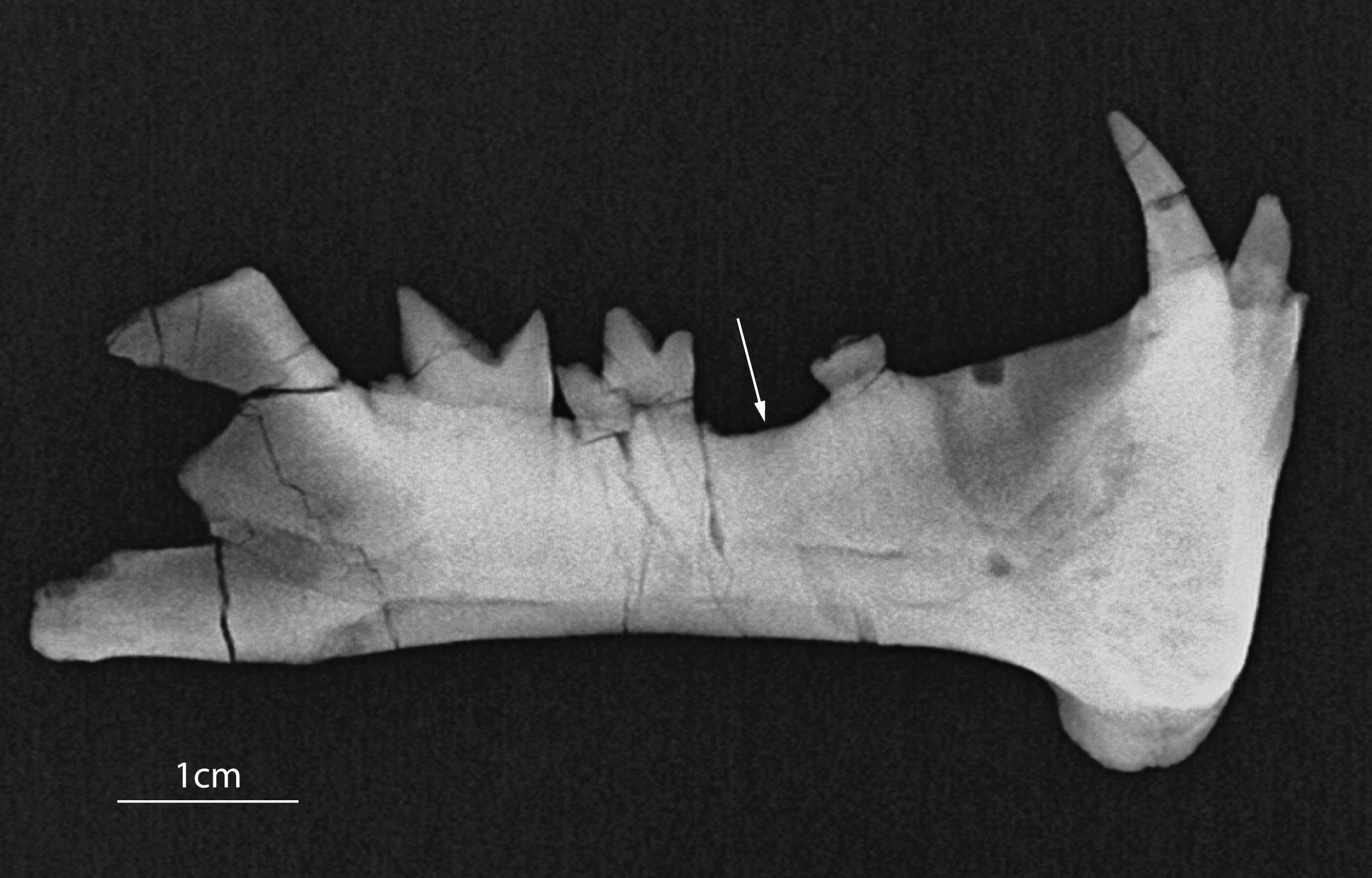
A radiograph showing a missing tooth in SDSNH 38343, the paper has noted that this could be pathological or it could have happened well antemortem.

Diegoaelurus vanvalkenburghae was small in stature, with a size comparable to a fossa. The holotype fossils (SDSNH 38343) consists of a mandible and well preserved dentition. Its discovery has made paleontologists question whether this group's extinction was caused due to the large faunal turnover during the transitional period between middle and late Eocene. This creature as well as its subfamily were some of the first predatory saber toothed mammals to have evolved, 30 million years before the Machairodontinae (saber-toothed cats) evolved in the Miocene. Due to the lack of remains, there is questioning to these animals ecological niches. However, there are good remains from Machaeroides eothen that support a hypercarnivorous lifestyle for the group. D. vanvalkenburghae was one of the last surviving members of its subfamily.

== Classification ==
The phylogenetic relationships of genus Diegoaelurus are shown in the following cladogram:

- Machaeroidinae
  - - Machaeroides simpsoni
    - Machaeroides eothen
  - - Diegoaelurus vanvalkenburghae
    - - Apataelurus pishigouensis
      - Apataelurus kayi

== Extinction ==
Diegoaelurus along with all the members of its subfamily died out in the middle Eocene, which may be linked to the significant faunal overturn during the transition period between the middle and late Eocene. Some have argued that the cause of their extinction was due to potential competition with nimravids, other experts don’t agree with this, as the excellent North American fossil record indicates oxyaenids were declining before the appearance of the replacement taxa such as nimravids. In addition, the youngest records of machaeroidines predate the oldest records of nimravids.

Instead, their extinction was likely due to the changing climate. During the last 10 million years of the Eocene (43 to 33 Ma), the planet transitioned from a warm moist tropical world to a cooler, seasonally arid one. Because of their low mobility, as well as preference for closed habitats, oxyaenids couldn’t adapt to the more open, temperate forests. Once oxyaenids went extinct, their ecological niche was filled by the nimravids, a family of saber-toothed mammals that belonged to the group Feliformia, as well as hyaenodonts, amphicyonids, and early canids.
