= False saber-toothed cat =

False saber-toothed cat may refer to:

- Nimravidae, an extinct family of cat-like carnivorans
- Barbourofelidae, an extinct family of carnivorans possibly related to true cats

== See also ==
- Saber-toothed cat, members of Machairodontinae
- Saber-toothed predator, various extinct groups of predators with saber-teeth
