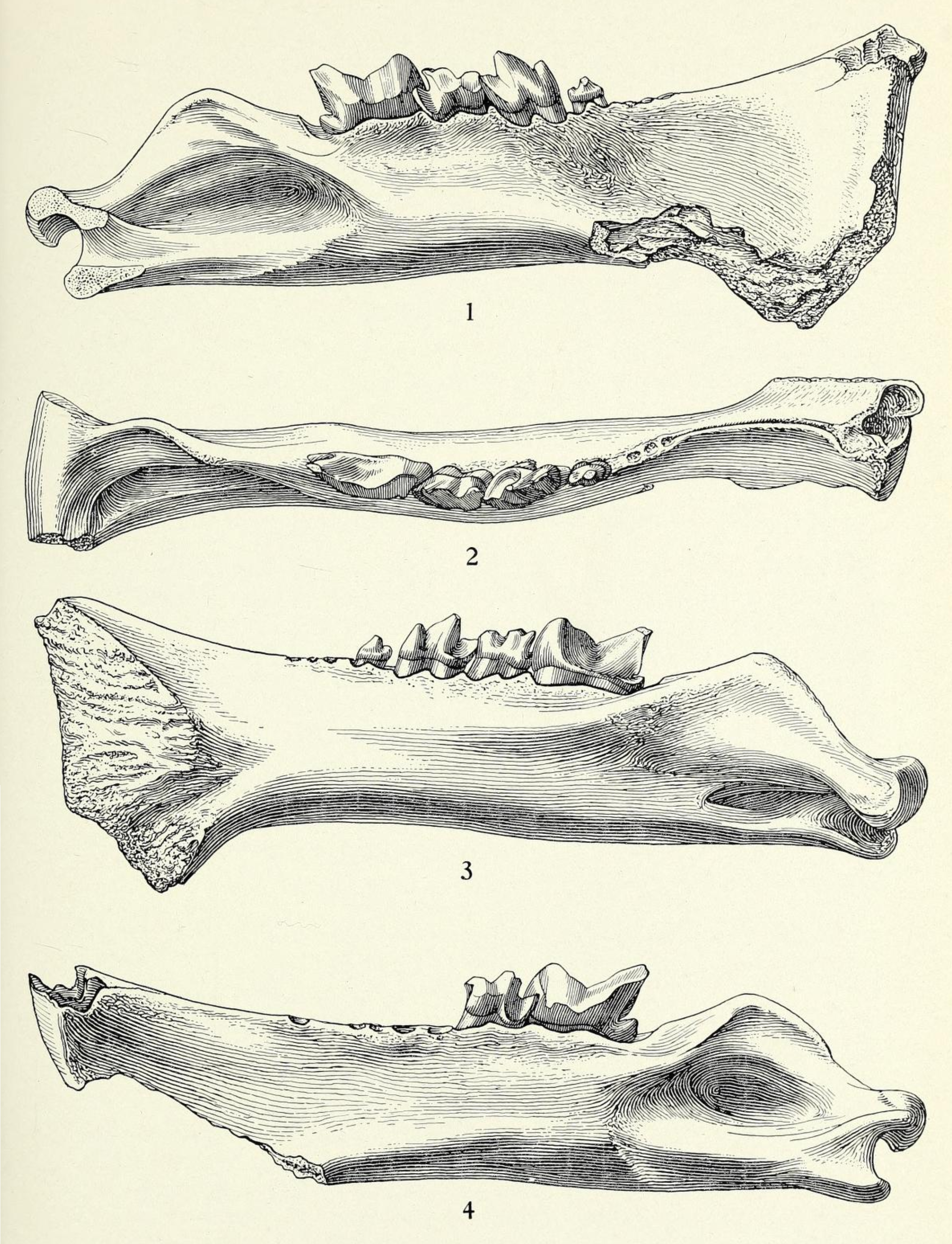
- Lower jaw of A. kayi

Scientific classification
- Kingdom: Animalia
- Phylum: Chordata
- Class: Mammalia
- Order: †Oxyaenodonta
- Family: †Oxyaenidae
- Subfamily: †Machaeroidinae
- Genus: †Apataelurus; Scott, 1938

Type species
- †Apataelurus kayi Scott, 1938

Species
- †Apataelurus kayi Scott, 1938; †Apataelurus pishigouensis (Tong and Lei, 1986)

= Apataelurus =

Apataelurus Temporal range: Middle Eocene (Lutetian), ~45–42 Ma

Genus of extinct placental mammals

Apataelurus ("false cat") is an extinct genus of saber-toothed mammals from the extinct family Oxyaenidae, that lived in North America and East Asia during the Middle Eocene, 45-42 million years ago. This genus was defined by teeth that were well-adapted to a carnivorous diet. A distinct feature described was a long upper canine tooth that resembled a saber tooth. There are two species currently described: Apataelurus kayi, the type species, and Apataelurus pishigouensis, discovered in 1986.

As a large, leopard-sized predator, Apataelurus dominated the Uinta Formation area. It was adapted to taking on large prey with more motion-tolerant muscles in its mouth, allowing it to attack large prey that would struggle or fight back. Apataelurus was closely related to other members of Machaeroidinae, such as Diegoaelurus vanvalkenburghae. Apataelurus was a derived member of Oxyaenidae, and lived in the middle to late Lutetian age. Apataelurus and other species within the Uinta Basin emerged during a major transitional period between the reduction in tropical zones and the increase in temperate and subtropical biomes.

== Discovery and naming ==
A. kayi was originally described by William Berryman Scott in Wagonhound Canyon at the Uinta Formation of the Uinta Basin, Utah. It was described and published in May 1938 as a "problematical, cat-like mandible". A. kayi was described from two separate halves of a lower jaw, the left half containing two of the cheek teeth, and the right half with four cheek teeth.

Apataelurus originates from Greek, with "apat" (false or tricky) and "aelurus" (cat or feline). A. kayi was named for American paleontologist J. Leroy Kay.

The second species, Apataelurus pishigouensis, was discovered at the Hetaoyuan Formation in Henan, China in 1986 by Yongsheng Tong and Yizhen Lei. A. pishigouensis was named for the Pishigou fossil site, where it was discovered by Tong and Lei. A. pishigouensis was originally named Propterodon pishigouensis, under Hyaenodonta, but a study by S.P. Zack in 2019 reclassified the species into the genus Apataelurus and family Oxyaenidae. During the study, Zack noticed that "P. pishigouensis" had an anterior dentary flange, a feature not present in any found Hyaenodonta. However, similar flanges had been discovered in machaeroidines, to which A. kayi belonged to.

== Description ==
Apataelurus kayi is noted to have been large among macheroidines. Egi (2001) estimated A. kayi was at least 50% larger than Limnocyon potens in dental dimensions, which is slightly larger than Machaeroides eothen. Zack (2022) suggested the closely related Diegoaelurus was smaller than A. kayi. Juhn (2024) used a scaling method proposed by Blaire Van Valkenburgh in 1990, wherein the size of the largest lower molar was used in a regression analysis, to calculate the body sizes of various extinct mammalian predators, listing their mass estimates in their supplemental materials. Using this method, they obtained a body mass of 18.33 kg (40.4 lb) for A. kayi. A. pishigouensis differs from A. kayi primarily in its smaller size. The talonid of A. pishigouensis is smaller than that of A. kayi.

Collected Apataelurus specimens consist exclusively of remains of the lower jaw. The largest find is an almost complete lower jaw, which contains part of the rear teeth. Based on the existing dental sockets, a dental formula with two incisors, one canine, four premolars, and two molars was likely present.

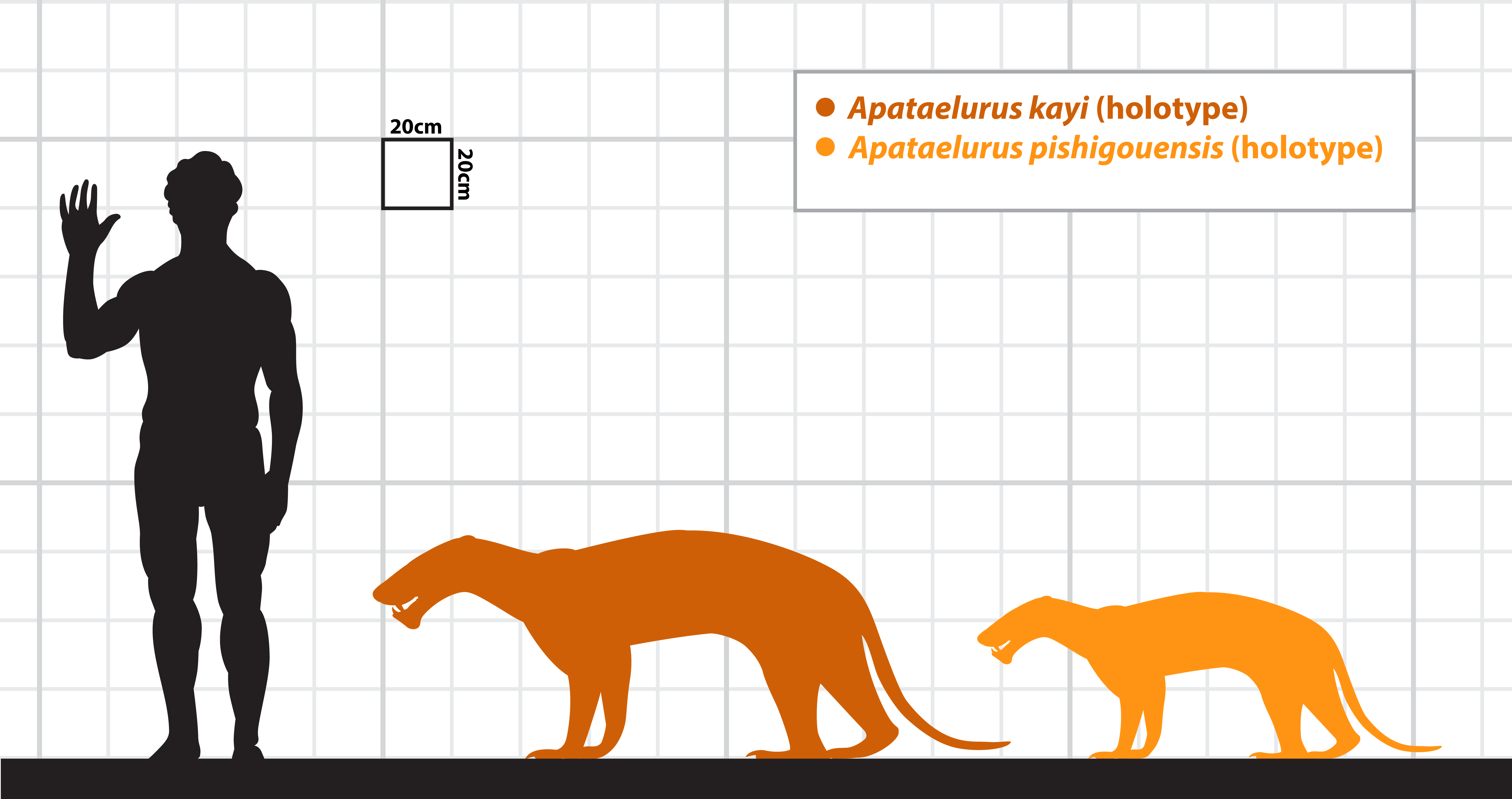
A size comparison chart comparing the two identified species of Apataelurus.

The lower jaw was 14.9 cm (5.9 in) long and 2.7 cm (1.1 in) high below the first molar. This is characteristic of predators whose upper canines were significantly elongated, as is the case, for example, in saber-toothed cats. They protected the canine tooth when the jaw was closed. A. pishigouensis and A. kayi share a well developed paraconid, a major cusp on the inner edge of the cheek teeth. Both A. pishigouensis and A. kayi also have distinctly broader talonids compared to Propterodon.

The ascending ramus, the lower part of the jaw, to which pterygoid muscles attach, featured a deep masseteric fossa (a flat bone surface) with sharp edges to which the masseter muscle attached. The articular process and coronoid process were both significantly reduced in size compared to machaeroidines. Both the protrusion of the front segment of the mandible and the low position of the coronoid process were more pronounced in Apataelurus than in the closely related Machaeroides.

== Classification ==
Apataelurus is a genus in the subfamily Machaeroidinae, within the family Oxyaenidae and the extinct order Oxyaenodonta. According to phylogenetic studies, the clade Pan-Carnivora is split into two orders: Oxyaenodonta and Hyaenodonta.

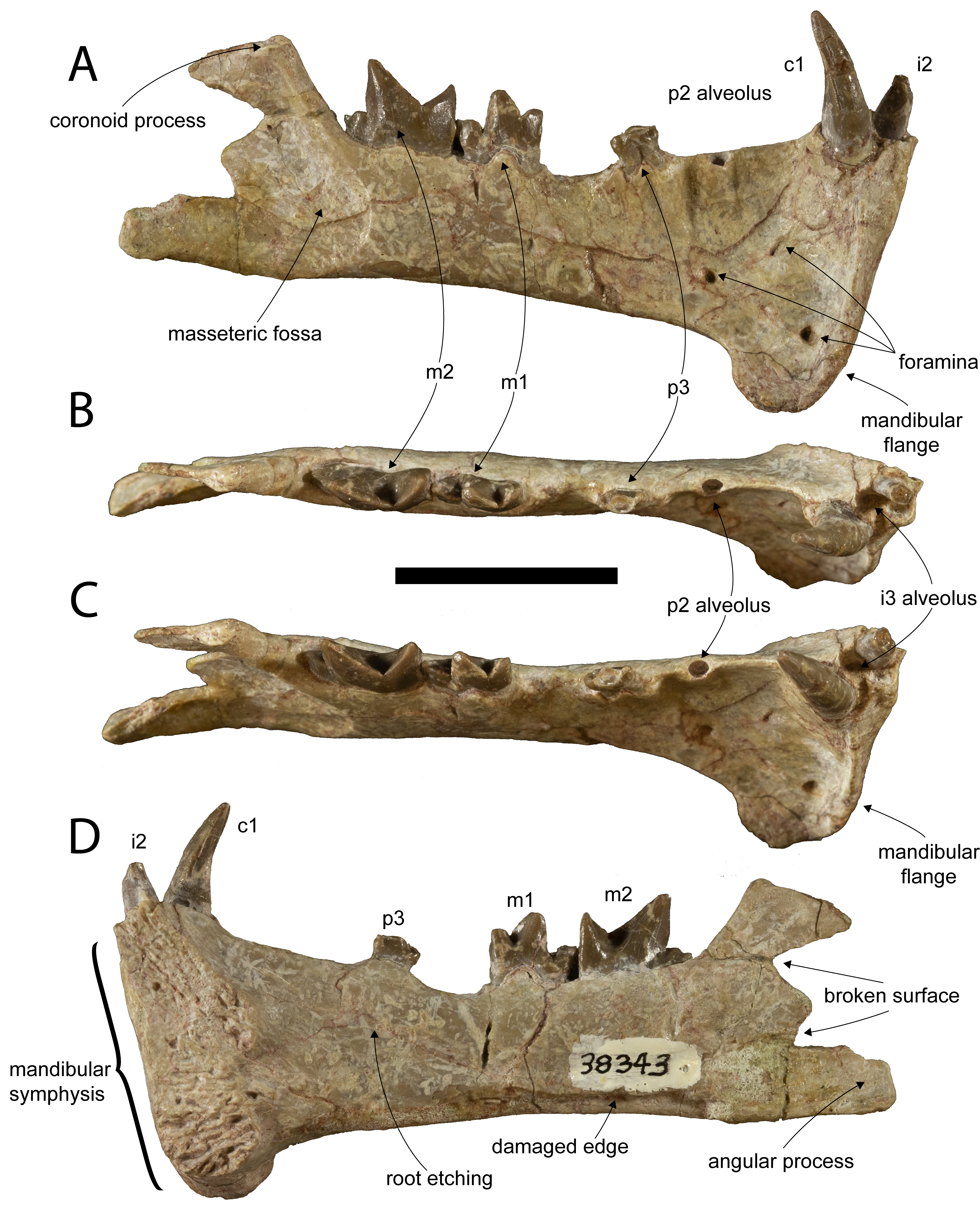
Diegoaelurus, a related Oxyaenid, had a very similar mouth and tooth structure to Apataelurus. However, Diegoaelurus had a shorter mandibular flange. Shown here is the holotype of Diegoaelurus.

Three oxyaenid genera and four species have thus far been described: Machaeroides, with species M. simpsoni and M. eothen, Apataelurus, and Diegoaelurus. Of the three genera, Machaeroides is the most primitive, with very few adaptations to the saber tooth dental form. Apataelurus and Diegoaelurus are similar in appearance, slightly more derived from M. eothen. However, Diegoaelurus differed with its shorter mandibular flange, suggesting a more specialized carnivorous diet.

- Machaeroidinae
  - Diegoaelurus vanvalkenburghae
  - - Apataelurus pishigouensis
    - Apataelurus kayi

The cladogram above shows the divergence of the three species.

== Paleobiology ==
Life reconstruction of the head and neck of Apataelurus kayi, based on the holotype jaw described by Scott, 1937.

Due to a lack of specimens, there is little information about Apataelurus' paleobiology and behavior. Apataelurus' dentition and similarity to creodonts and Machaeroides suggests that it had a carnivorous diet. It likely hunted large prey, including uintatheres and brontotheriid perissodactyls. A. pishigouensis, which lived in now-China, likely hunted perissodactyls related to modern-day tapirs. Almost all oxyaenodonts for which the body skeleton is at least partially known had an elongated body structure with short, powerful legs. Based on similar species’ skeletons, it can be assumed that Apataelurus had a plantar walk.

The mandible of A. kayi is less reinforced from the top and bottom (dorsoventrally) of its skull than the two Machaeroides species. This difference could indicate that small Machaeroidinae fed on smaller prey, which were less able to inflict torsional stress upon the predator's jaws. A. kyai's mandible could have been less buttressed to allow for more torsion resistant motion (side to side or twisting motions) when dealing with larger and stronger prey.

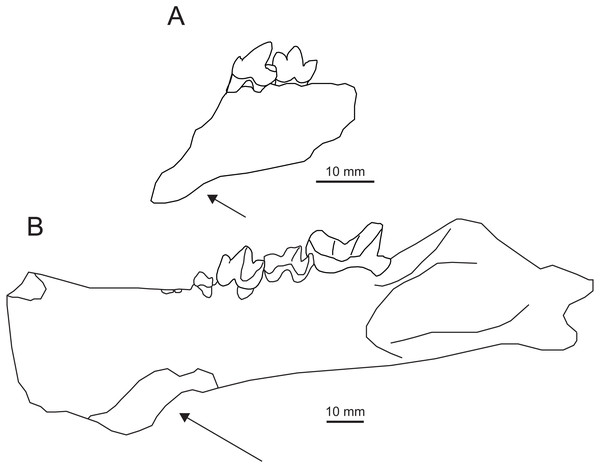
Apataelurus pishigouensis' lower mandible (A), and Apataelurus kayi's lower mandible (B).

At the carnassial, the bite force of A. kayi was 3 and a half times greater than that of the smaller M. eothen. A. kayi had 89% of the bite force of Panthera pardus, a contemporary predatory mammal with similar mandibular length. Studies showed that the mandible of Machaeroidinae is stronger at the canine teeth rather than the cheek teeth, indicating that they delivered powerful canine bites to kill their prey, like felids, rather than shallow bites like hyaenids.

The relative mandibular force values of Machaeroides eothen and A. kayi are similar to those of conical-toothed felids. These conical-toothed felids, Machairodontinae, tended to have stretched out jaw muscles, which led them to develop a weaker bite. From these mandibular properties, it can be assumed that Machaeroidinae delivered canine bites on prey that offered relatively less resistance than the prey of larger conical-toothed felids. As such, prey must have been held down before the saber-like canines were used to kill. Machaeroides and Apataelurus had well-developed shearing teeth and long slicing canines and may have been similar to small to medium sized species of extant cats.

== Paleoecology ==
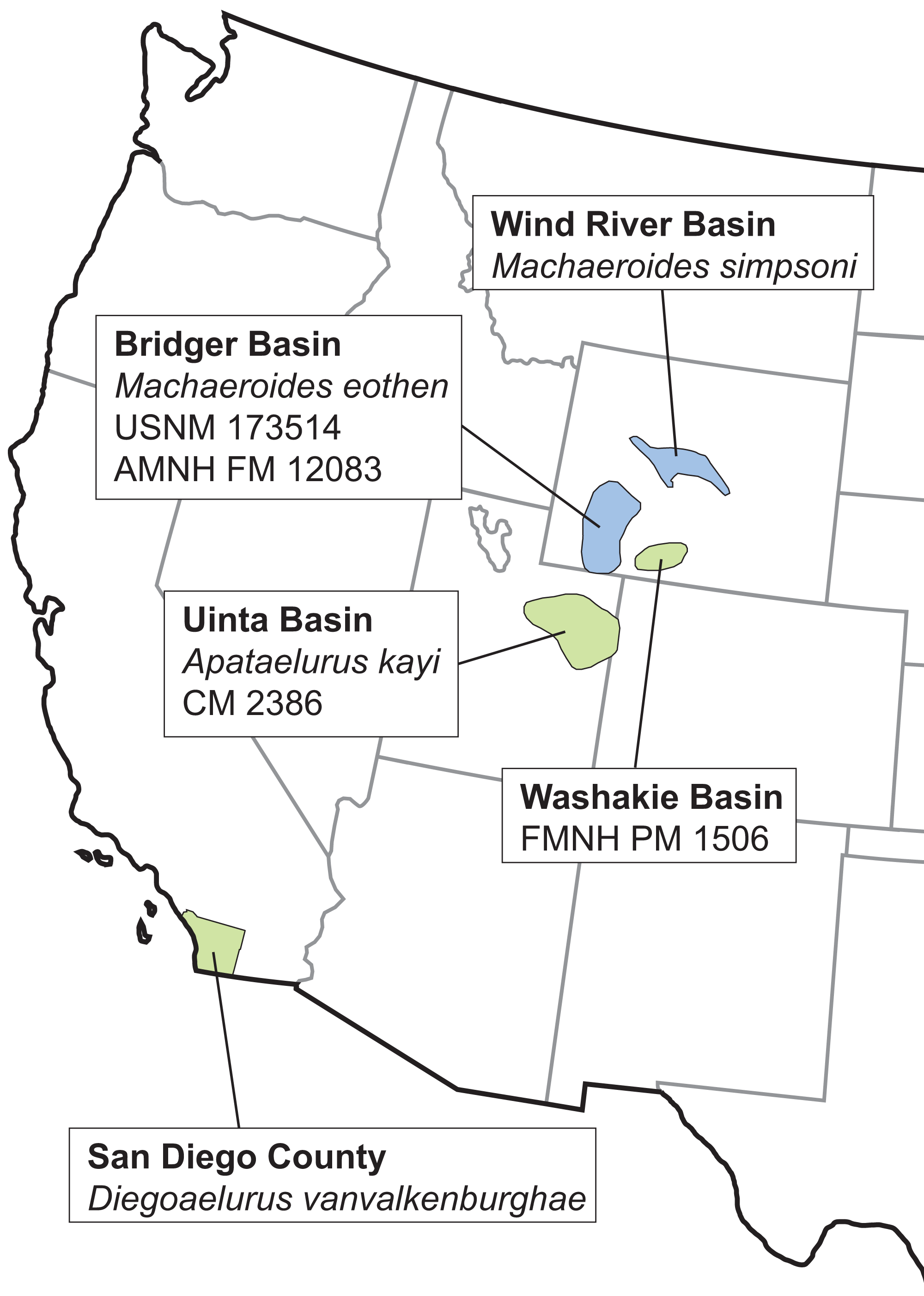
A map showing the distribution of Machaeroidinae species across the western United States.

Apataelurus lived in a warm and humid climate, characterized by fluvial and floodplain environments. In the early Eocene, temperatures surged, hypothesized to be caused by greenhouse gas emissions, an equatorial warm saline deep water, or both. However, oceanic cooling began around 50 million years ago, cooling about 11-15 degrees Fahrenheit in the middle-late Eocene and a loss of tropical environments in North America. Previous to the development of the fluvial environment, the Uinta Formation and the nearby Green River Formation were composed of lacustrine habitats. These lakes began to recede slowly in the late middle Eocene, about the time that Apataelurus emerged.

The Uinta Formation in this area comprises an interbedded sequence of silt, clay, and small amounts of gravel. The Uinta Basin was formed in the very Late Cretaceous during the Laramide uplift of the Uinta Mountains. This formation, alongside the Green River and Piceance Creek basins, began forming during the Laramide orogeny. The Laramide orogeny was a period of great tectonism in North America that began in the Late Cretaceous and continued until the late Eocene.

=== Uinta Formation ===
The Uinta Formation is notable for its vast deposits of fossil mammals, which would come to define the Uintan Stage of the North American Land Mammal Age (NALMA). The Uinta Formation has been formally divided into a lower Wagonhound Member, where Apataelurus was discovered, and an upper Myton Member. Despite this formal classification, geologists and paleontologists organize the formation into three components: Uinta A, B, and C. These are ordered from lowest (oldest) to highest. Uinta A and B comprise Wagonhound Canyon and the areas nearby, while C represents the Myton Member.

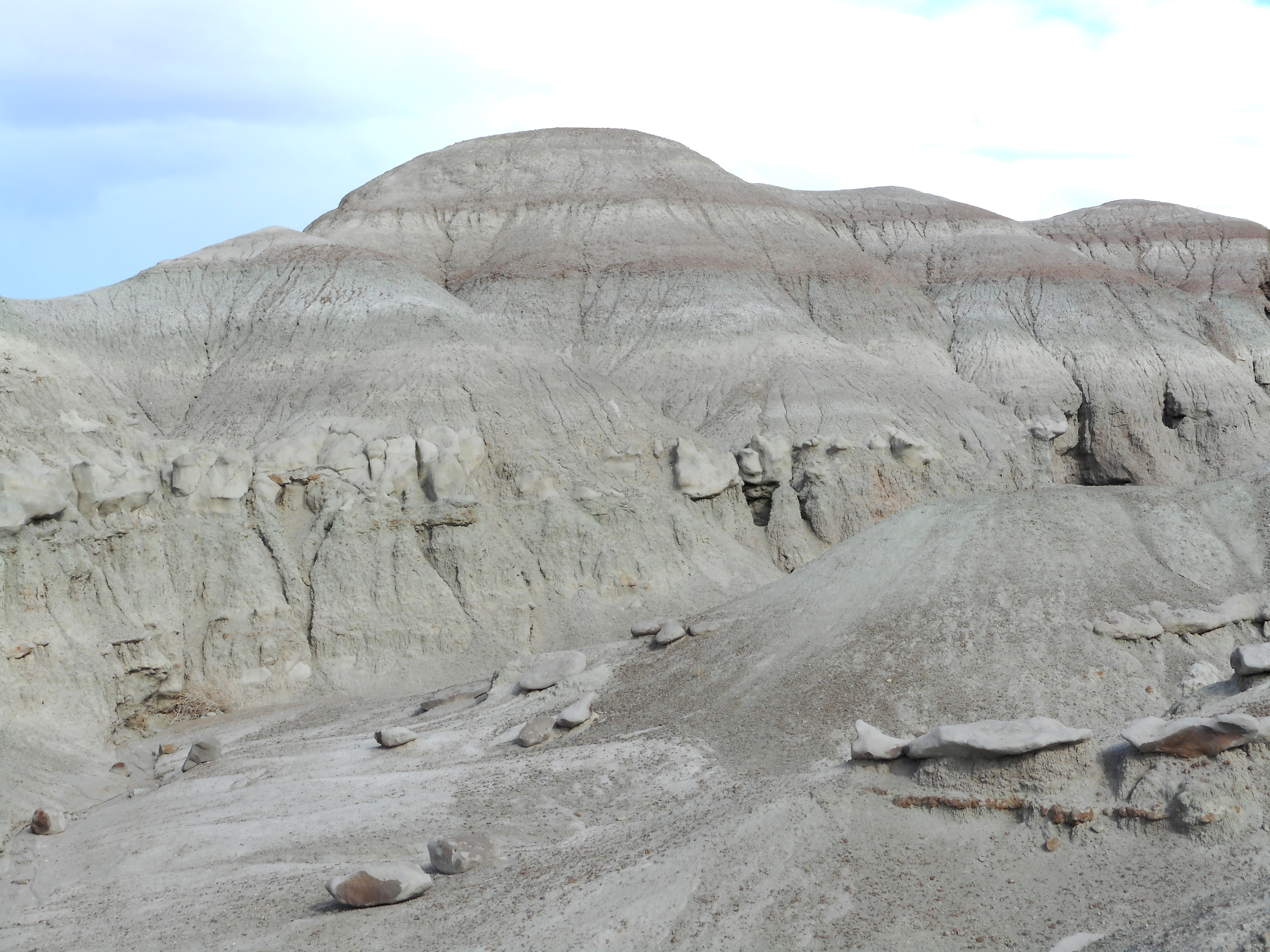
The Uinta Formation.

Based on the presence of Uintan brontotherids, Uinta A is post-Bridgerian. The Bridgerian was an American faunal stage under NALMA that preceded the Uintan, ranging from 46.2 to 50.5 Ma. The Uintan NALMA was a major transition in mammalian evolution, as approximately 30% of modern mammalian families appear in the fossil record. The Uintan NALMA was the end of a global greenhouse that had begun in the early Eocene. Tropical and rainforest biomes started to decrease, and subtropical and temperate habitats began to appear. Primitive perissodactyls were replaced with perissodactyls more adapted to the subtropical conditions. Rabbits made their first appearance alongside small rodents such as Paramys and the bat genus Honrovits.

Apataelurus was likely near the top of the food chain, with hypercarnivorous adaptations and size advantages over other oxyaenodonts. The Uinta Formation was dominated by perissodactyls such as Dolichorhinus, Metarhinus, and Sthenodectes.

=== Hetaoyuan Formation ===
The Hetaoyuan Formation is a section of the Biyang Depression (sag), in the Nanxiang Basin, which is a small intermountain faulted basin. The region is located within the Qin and Dabie Mountains orogenic belt in central China. The formation is divided into three sections, with the middle section (the Anpeng Deposits) displaying laminated oil shale, dolomite, and sodium carbonate minerals named nahcolite.

The Anpeng Deposits are remarkably similar in age to the Green River and Piceance Creek Formations, which were inhabited by A. kayi. The Biyang Sag has Cenozoic-age depositional systems consisting of braided deltas, slumped turbidite fans, and shallow and deep lakes. During the entire Paleogene, rivers collected sediments and created geological deposits in the lakes, creating shallow sections. These deposits also created braided river deltas, establishing small islands for Eocene flora and fauna to travel between. This environment is strikingly alike to the riverine and lacustrine Uinta Formation, where A. kayi lived.
