= Saber-toothed predator =

Group of extinct animals

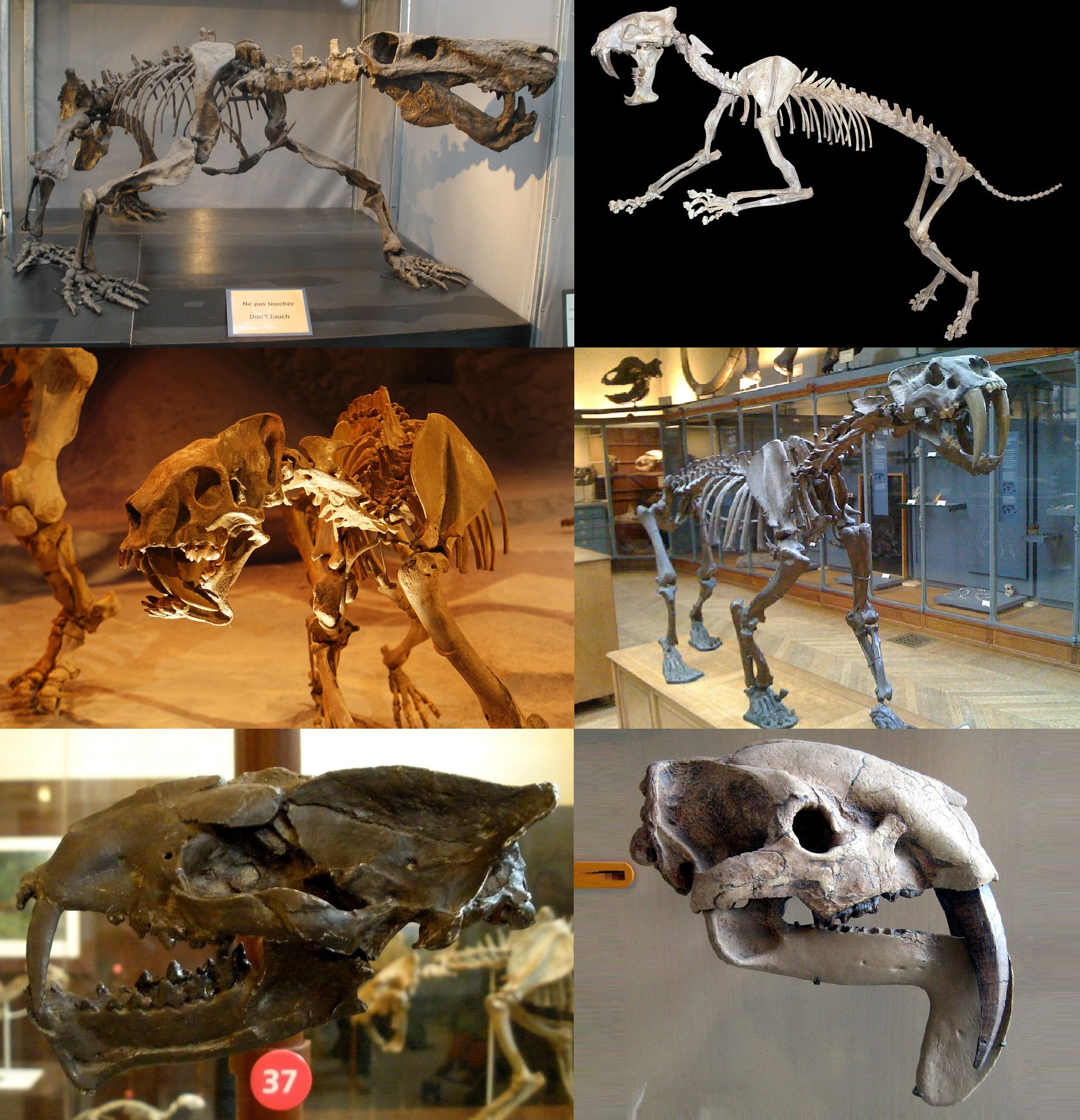
Gallery of a variety of sabertoothed predators. Top left: Inostrancevia (Gorgonopsia), Top right: Hoplophoneus (Nimravidae), Centre left: Barbourofelis (Barbourofelinae), Centre right: Smilodon (Machairodontinae), Bottom left: Machaeroides (Machaeroidinae) Bottom right: Thylacosmilus (Thylacosmilidae)

A saber-tooth (alternatively spelled sabre-tooth) is any member of various extinct groups of predatory therapsids, predominantly carnivoran mammals, that are characterized by long, curved saber-shaped canine teeth which protruded from the mouth when closed.

Among the earliest animals that can be described as "sabertooths" were Middle-Late Permian (~274-252 million years ago) non-mammalian therapsids including the gorgonopsians as well as some basal therocephalians (lycosuchids and scylacosaurids).

Saber-toothed mammals have been found worldwide from the Eocene epoch to the early Holocene epoch (52.4 million years ago – 8,200 years ago). One of the best-known genera is the "saber-toothed cat" Smilodon, the species of which, especially S. fatalis, are popularly referred to as "saber-toothed tigers", although they are not closely related to tigers (Panthera), and are instead members of the extinct cat subfamily Machairodontinae (the true saber-toothed cats), most members of which had saber-teeth of varying lengths.

Despite some similarities, not all mammalian saber-tooths were closely related to saber-toothed cats or felids in-general. For example, many members are classified into different family of Feliformia, the Nimravidae; or from a separate order such as Machaeroides and Apataelurus, which are members of the order Oxyaenodonta, and one extinct lineage of metatherian mammals (related to marsupials), represented by the thylacosmilids of the order Sparassodonta. In this regard, these saber-toothed mammals can be viewed as examples of convergent evolution. This convergence is remarkable due not only to the development of elongated canines, but also a suite of other characteristics, such as a wide gape and bulky forelimbs, which is so consistent that it has been termed the "saber-tooth suite."

Among the feliform sabertooth lineages, the family Nimravidae was the oldest, with the oldest fossils dated to 42 Ma of the Eocene. Some sabertooth predators have been known to have lived in the same habitats as seen with basal therocephalians and gorgonopsians in Middle-Late Permian, as well as machairodonts and nimravids (specifically Barbourofelinae) in the Late Miocene.

== Evolution ==
The different groups of saber-toothed predators evolved their saber-toothed characteristics entirely independently. They are most known for having maxillary canines which extended down from the mouth when the mouth was closed.

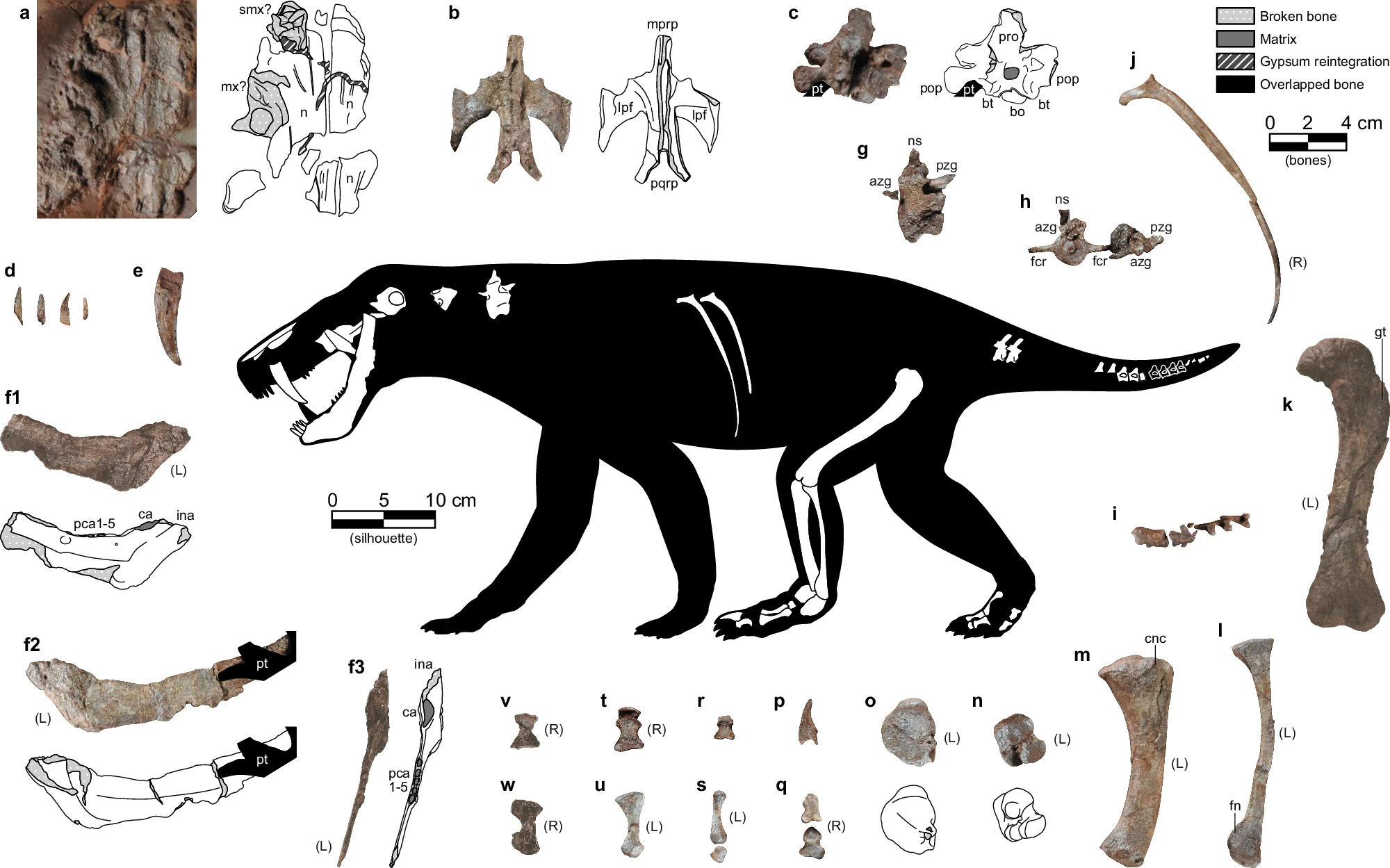
DA21/17-01-01, a gorgonopsian specimen from the Permian Port des Canonge Formation of Mallorca, currently the oldest known member of the clade

The first saber-tooths to appear were non-mammalian therapsids, the gorgonopsians; they were one of the first groups of animals within Synapsida to experience the specialization of saber teeth, and many had long canines. The oldest definitive worldwide gorgonopsian fossil was found in Port des Canonge Formation of Mallorca in the western Mediterranean dating to earliest Wordian of the Middle Permian, although the stratigraphic position of the gorgonopsian, as well as surrounding fossil track record may suggest it is significantly older, potentially Roadian stage of the Middle Permian or even of the Kungurian or Artinskian stages of the Early Permian.

The second and third instances of sabertooth predators were presented by basal therocephalians (scylacosaurids and lycosuchids). The oldest known scylacosaurid, Eutheriodon, was found in the Eodicynodon Assemblage Zone, which dates to the Wordian stage. While earliest lycosuchid fossils were found in the Tapinocephalus Assemblage Zone of the Capitanian stage of the Middle Permian, phylogeny suggests lycosuchids were the most basal therocephalians.

Gorgonopsians were subordinate to the dinocephalians and basal therocephalians, with the exceptions such as Phorcys and Jirahgorgon, who were probably the top predators of their locality. However, all dinocephalians and most basal therocephalians would later go extinct during the primary phase of the Capitanian mass extinction event, which may have been caused by volcanism that originated from the Emeishan Traps. While some basal therocephalians, such as Lycosuchus and Alopecognathus, survived the primary phase, they would later go extinct during the secondary wave of extinction. The extinction of dinocephalians and basal therocephalians, gorgonopsians occupied niches left vacant by increasing in size and becoming top predators. Gorgonopsians were able to replace the basal therocephalians as they were less restricted by prey sizes due to their more powerful jaws.

During Wuchiapingian-Changhsingian stages of the Late Permian, many gorgonopsians began to go extinct in Africa and Eastern Europe. The cause of the gorgonopsians extinction in Eastern Europe was the inability to adapt to the changing temperature and humidity and were replaced by archosauriforms and large therocephalians. In Africa, most of the large-bodied rubidgeines died out early in the Daptocephalus Assemblage Zone. Rubidgea, the last rubidgeine, went extinct during a turnover event that separates the lower and upper subzones, being replaced by Inostrancevia. The last gorgonopsians, Inostrancevia africana and Cyonosaurus, went extinct during the Permian–Triassic extinction event, which was likely due to volcanic activities that originated from Siberian Traps. The resulting eruption caused a significant climatic disruption unfavorable to their survival, leading to their extinction. Their ecological niches gave way to modern terrestrial ecosystems including sauropsids, mostly archosaurs, and among the few therapsids surviving the event, mammals. The extinction of the gorgonopsians marked the beginning of a sabertooth hiatus that lasted for 200 million years.

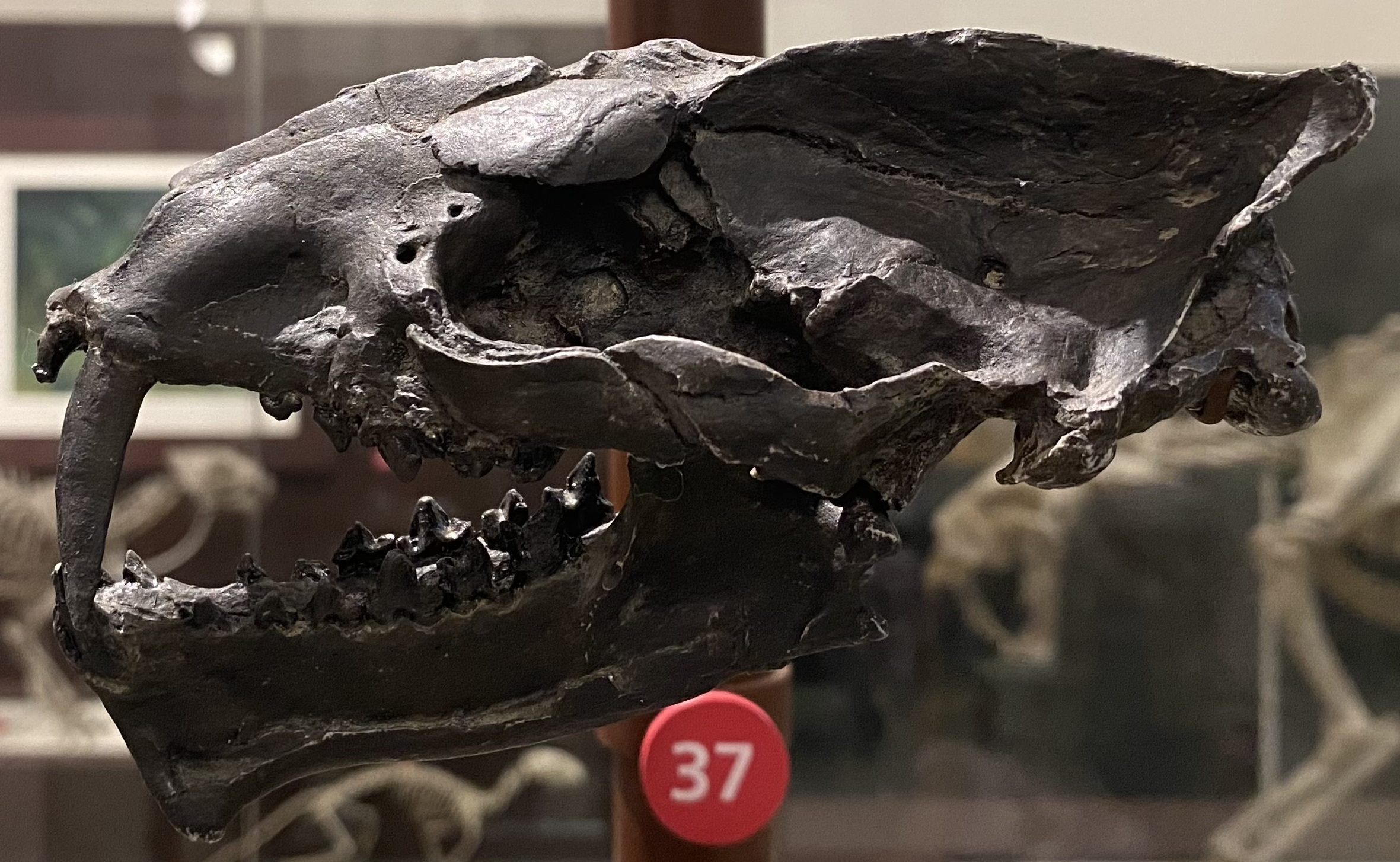
Skull of Machaeroides eothen, one of the oldest and most basal machaeroidine

The fourth instance of saber-teeth is from machaeroidines of the extinct order Oxyaenodonta. The earliest known machaeroidine was Machaeroides simpsoni, which first appeared in the Early Eocene. The last macheroidines died out in the middle Eocene, which was linked to the significant faunal overturn during the transition period between the middle and late Eocene. Some experts hypothesized that their extinction was the result of competition with nimravids, other experts found no evidence of competitive displacement, as the excellent North American fossil record indicates oxyaenids were declining before the appearance of the replacement taxa such as nimravids. In addition, the youngest records of machaeroidines predate the oldest records of nimravids in North America.

Instead, their extinction was likely due to the changing climate. During the last 10 million years of the Eocene (43 to 33 Ma), the planet transitioned from a warm moist tropical world to a cooler, seasonally arid one. Because of their low mobility, as well as preference for closed habitats, oxyaenids couldn't adapt to the more open, temperate forests.

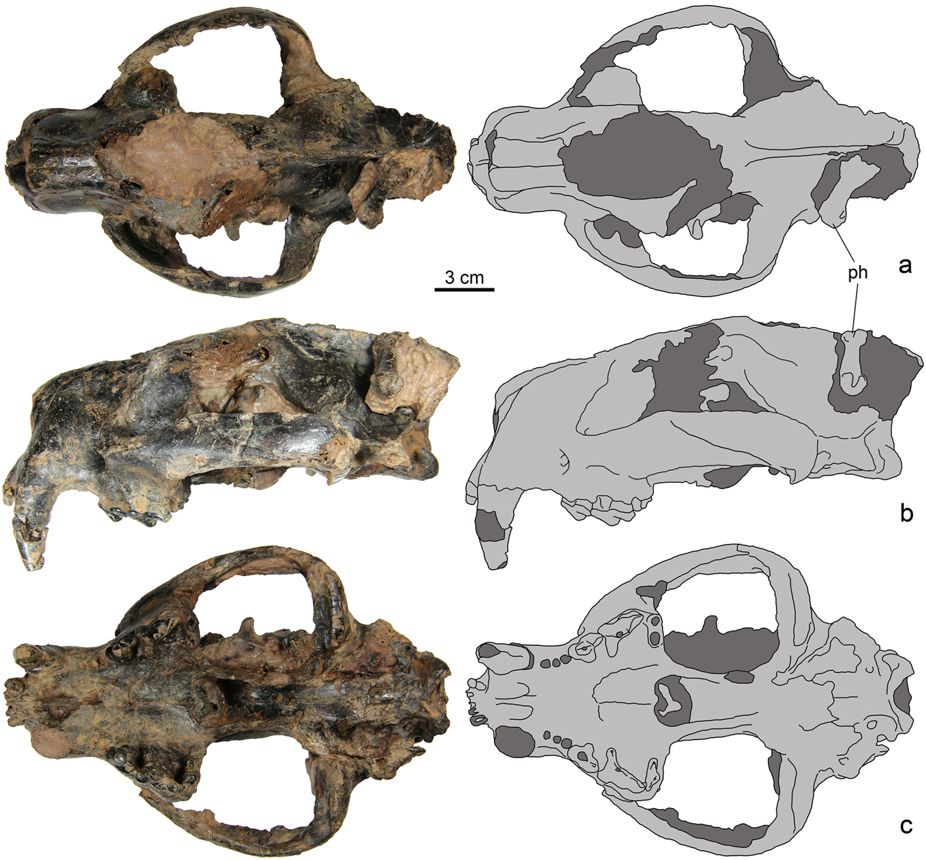
Recovered and reconstructed cranial material of Maofelis cantonensis, currently the oldest named nimravid

The fifth saber-tooth appearance is the basal feliform (carnivoran) family Nimravidae, which also includes the barbourofelines. The oldest known nimravid was found in the Lushi and Dongjun formations of China, which dated to the middle Eocene. The next oldest nimravid was Maofelis middle of the Eocene epoch, about 41.03 Ma. The earliest record of nimravids in North America was represented by Pangurban, which first appeared around 40 Ma. The diversification of the early nimravids was likely the result of the decline and extinction of oxyaenids, which opened the niche of felid-like carnivores. Nimravids made their first appearance in Europe during the early Oligocene following the Grand Coupre. Nimravids also saw their greatest diversity during the early Oligocene with at least 13 contemporary species.

The family then saw a decline in diversity in both Europe and North America, both corresponding with the increase in aridity, and in the case of North American nimravids, competition with amphicyonids. The extinction of North American nimravids started the infamous cat gap, a 7 million year period when no cat-like predators were present in North America. Barbourofelines probably evolved from Nimravinae dispersing into Africa during the early Miocene. The presence of large hyaenodonts prevented them from reaching a large size but were able to carve a niche due to their dental morphology. Eventually, they dispersed from Africa into Eurasia around 18 Ma and later North America around 12 Ma.

The arrival of barbourofelines in North America was thought to have placed a role in the decline and extinction of hesperocyonines. Over course of the Late Miocene, barbourofelines declined in diversity, going extinct in Europe and East Asia around 9.1 and 8.5 Ma respectively. Their extinction in Europe was correlated with the Vallesian-Turolian turnover event, also known as the Vallesian Crisis, which saw high extinction rates along with high levels of appearances of mammalian fauna. The Vallesian Crisis saw an increase of precipitation of seasonality, which gave way for drier, more open environments. Albanosmilus jourdani, the last European nimravid, went extinct due to the inability to adapt to the open environments. The last nimravids, represented by Albanosmilus whitfordi and Barbourofelis fricki, went extinct around 7 Ma. Some experts hypothesized the cause of their extinction was the result of competition with machairodonts as they were highly successful despite the expansion of grasslands. Other experts suggested it was more likely they went extinct due to the expansion of grasslands and the decline of favorable prey such as antilocaprids, camelids, dromomerycids, and equids.

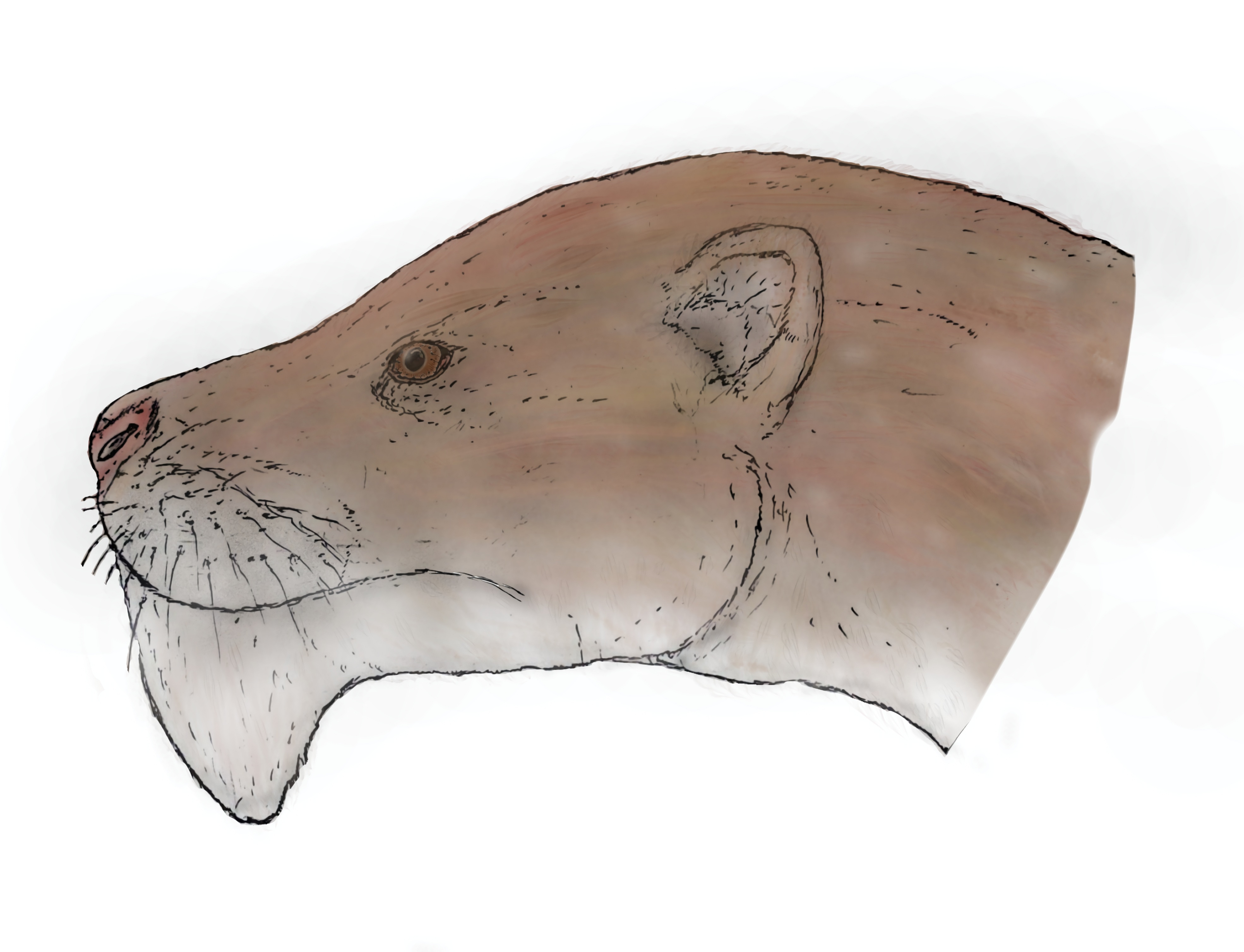
Head reconstruction of Patagosmilus, the oldest named thylacosmilid

The sixth appearance of saberteeth was Thylacosmilidae. They were part of an extinct order of metatherian mammals known as sparassodonts. The earliest known thylacosmilid fossil was dated to around 20.2 Ma, although a suspected origin within the Eocene-Oligocene boundary has been hypothesized for the family. One of the last thylacosmilids, Thylacosmilus atrox, went extinct during the late Pliocene, around 3 Ma. Originally, it was hypothesized that Thylacosmilus was outcompeted by carnivorans such as Smilodon. However, more recent evidence found no evidence of temporal or niche overlap between the two predators, instead extinction of Thylacosmilus and other sparassodonts was the result of the environmental changes. The youngest known thylacosmilid was Pampaluctor calibar, which persisted into the Early Pleistocene and coexisted with carnivorans such as Chapalmalania, as well as canids and mustelids.

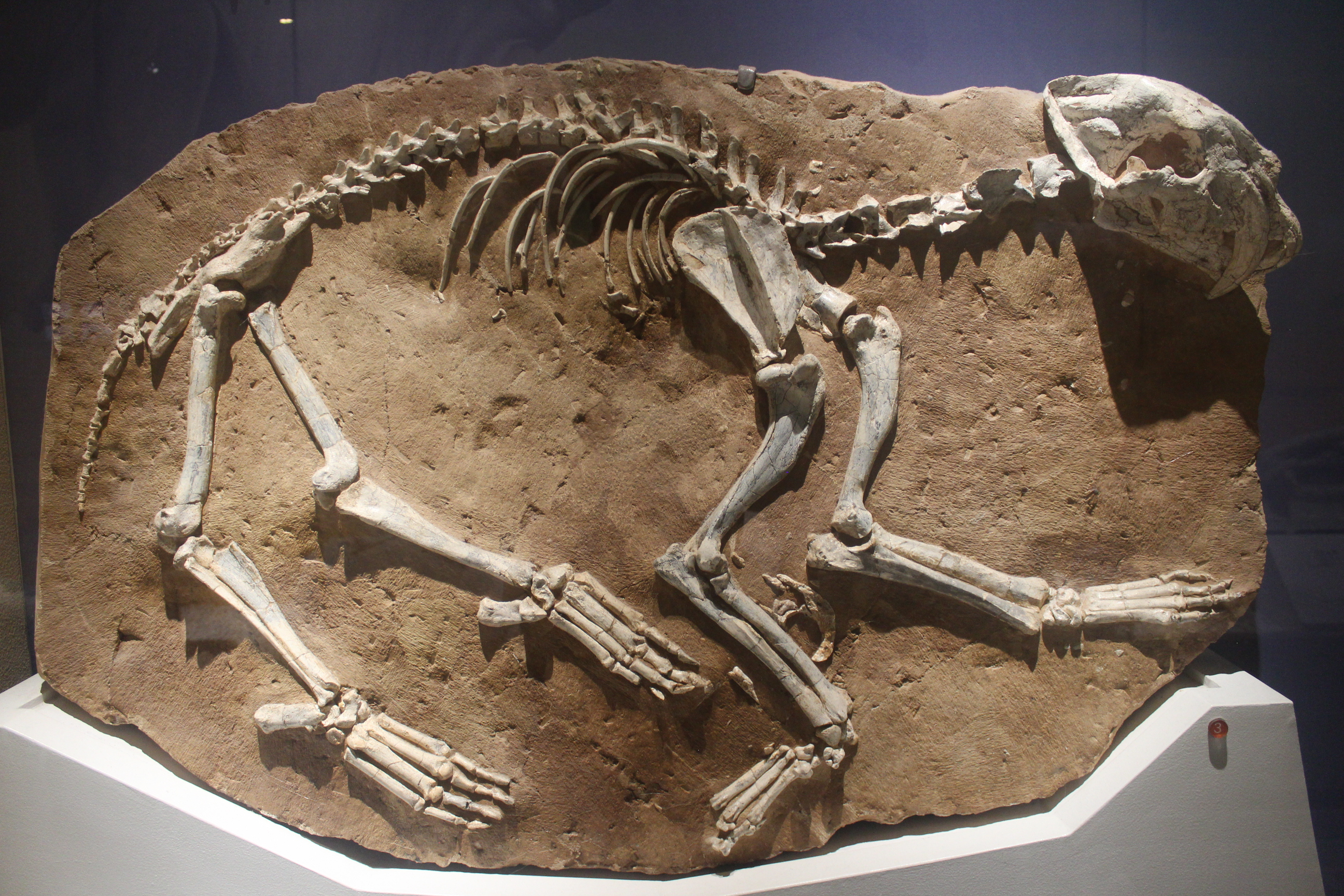
Skeleton of Machairodus aphantius, one of the most basal homotheres currently known

The seventh and last saber-toothed group to evolve were the machairodonts themselves. Mitochondrial DNA found that machairodonts split off from ancestors of living cats around 20 Ma, with Homotherium and Smilodon diverging from one another around 18 Ma. Machairodonts probably evolved from the basal felid Pseudaelurus quadridentatus showed a trend towards elongated upper canines, and is believed to be at the base of the machairodontine evolution. The earliest known machairodont was Miomachairodus from the late Middle Miocene. The earliest known homothere, Machairodus, first appeared in the fossil record around 12 Ma in Africa, before appearing in Europe around 10.4 Ma. The genus would later evolve into Amphimachairodus, which evolved around 9.8 Ma in East Asia. It would later make an appearance in Europe during the early Turolian replacing Machairodus. It would also disperse into North America during the Hemphillian stage, with the oldest fossils being found in Withlacoochee River 4A of Florida. Amphimachairodus was initially rarer than Nimravides, another homothere part of distinct linage, however Amphimachairodus would later replace Nimravides as grasslands began to expand in North America. The genus is also noted to have a pan-African distribution, and may have been the ancestor of Homotherium. The earliest Homotherium fossils were found in Africa roughly 4.35 Ma, with the earliest Eurasian fossils dating to 4.2 Ma. The genus would make its first appearance in North America during the Late Pliocene between 3.6 and 2.6 Ma. A homothere, which has been attributed to Xenosmilus or Homotherium, were found in South America dating from the Early to Middle Pleistocene, roughly 1.0-0.5 Ma.

Smilodontin first appeared in the Late Miocene with Promegantereon being the oldest known genus of the tribe, it would later be replaced by Paramachaerodus during the Turolian. Megantereon was another member of the tribe, with the oldest possible fossils associated to the genus being found in the Late Miocene Africa around 7 Ma. The oldest confirmed fossils of Megantereon were found in Kenya, dating to the Late Pliocene roughly 3.5-3.0 Ma, with possible older records dating to the Early Pliocene. In Eurasia, the oldest confirmed fossils were found in the Les Etouaries (France), which has been dated to 2.78 Ma. Smilodon first appeared in the fossil record during the Blancan stage of the Pleistocene in North America, possibly evolving from Megantereon. Smilodon first appears in South America during the Ensenadan stage of the Early Pleistocene.

Machairodonts began to decline during Late Miocene, with the decline of North American machairodonts coinciding with the decline of horses. This decline would persist into the Pleistocene, the cause of their decline in the Plio-Plestocene has been debated by experts. The extinction of African machairodonts has been hypothesized to be the result of competition with hominins. This has been contested by some experts, which argued that the expansion of grasslands and loss of forest covers were more detrimental to the large carnivorans as well the decline of megaherbivores. Additionally, evidence for anthropogenic extinctions by pre-erectus hominins to have been inconclusive, as it would suggest australopiths and early Homo were stealing prey from large carnivorans long before visible archaeological or anatomical evidence of carnivory among hominins. However, this contradicts zooarcheological evidence that suggests by 2.6 Ma, homininins were targeting medium sized prey, which has a larger impact on larger carnivores compared to smaller carnivores. Due to their specialization on consuming flesh, megapredators were more vulnerable to ancient anthropogenic extinctions. Additionally, there's little evidence of megapredators relying on megaherbivores.

In Europe, the extinction of Megantereon coincided with the expansion of grasslands, while Homotherium went extinct because of competition with early humans and Panthera fossilis. Homotherium and Smilodon were the last known members of the subfamily by the Late Pleistocene. The youngest Homotherium fossil was recovered in Alberta, Canada, and was dated to 12,715–12,655 years before the present. On the other hand, the youngest Smilodon fatalis fossil was recovered in the La Brea and was dated to 13,000 years ago. The extinction of Homotherium and Smilodon fatalis was contemporary with the wave of extinctions of most large animals across the Americas. The last known sabertooth predator was Smilodon populator, which was able to persist into the early Holocene, with the youngest fossils from the Jirau Paleontological Site being dated to 8,189–9,079 years before the present, likely going extinct because of the combination of climatic changes and human activity.

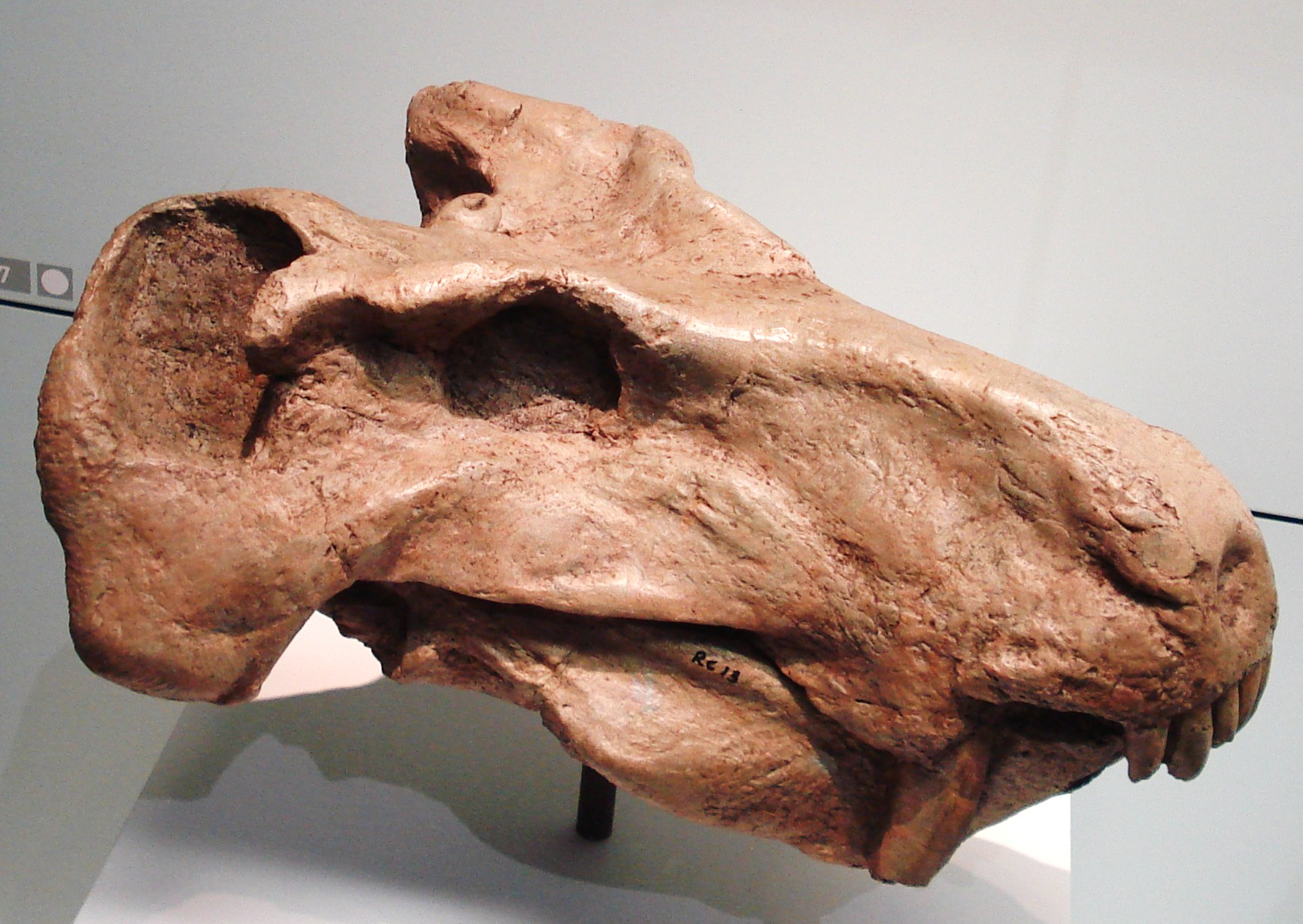
1st saber-tooth instance: Gorgonopsia (Theriodontia, Therapsida, Sphenacodontoidea) – Rubidgea atrox skull

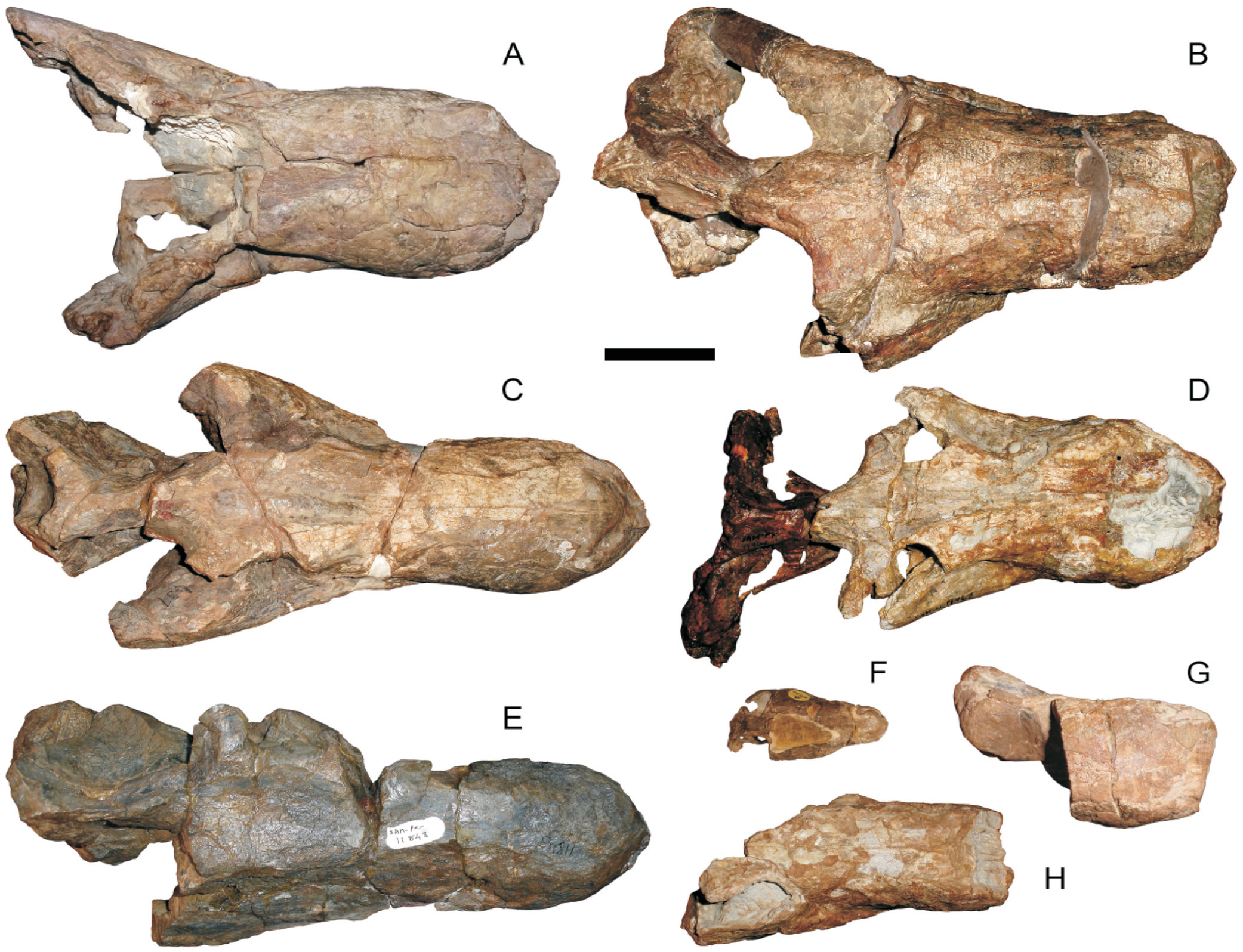
2nd saber-tooth instance: Scylacosauridae (Scylacosauria, Therocephalia, Eutheriodontia) – Glanosuchus macrops skull

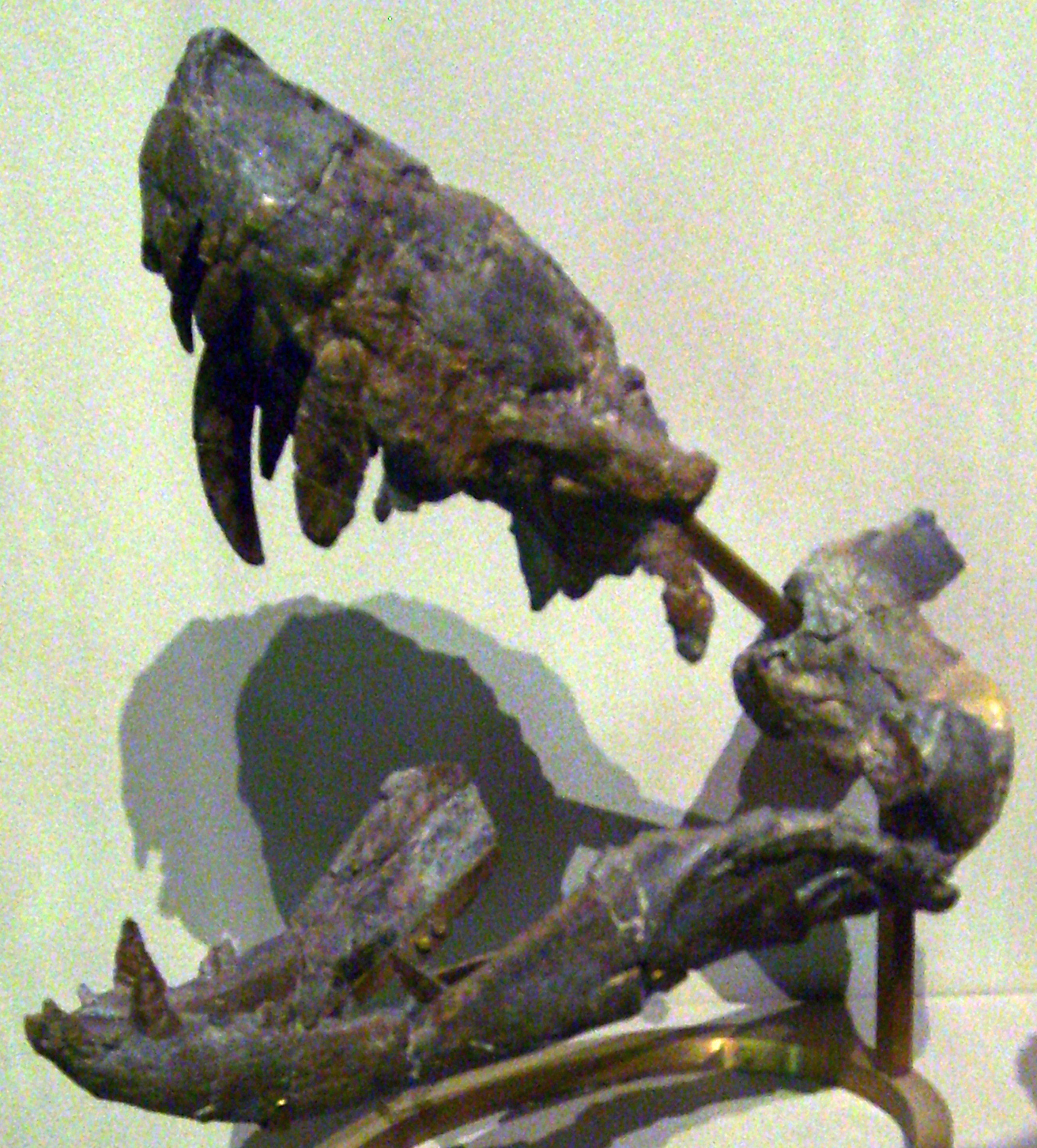
3rd saber-tooth instance: Lycosuchidae (Therocephalia, Eutheriodontia, Theriodontia) – Lycosuchus vanderrieti skull

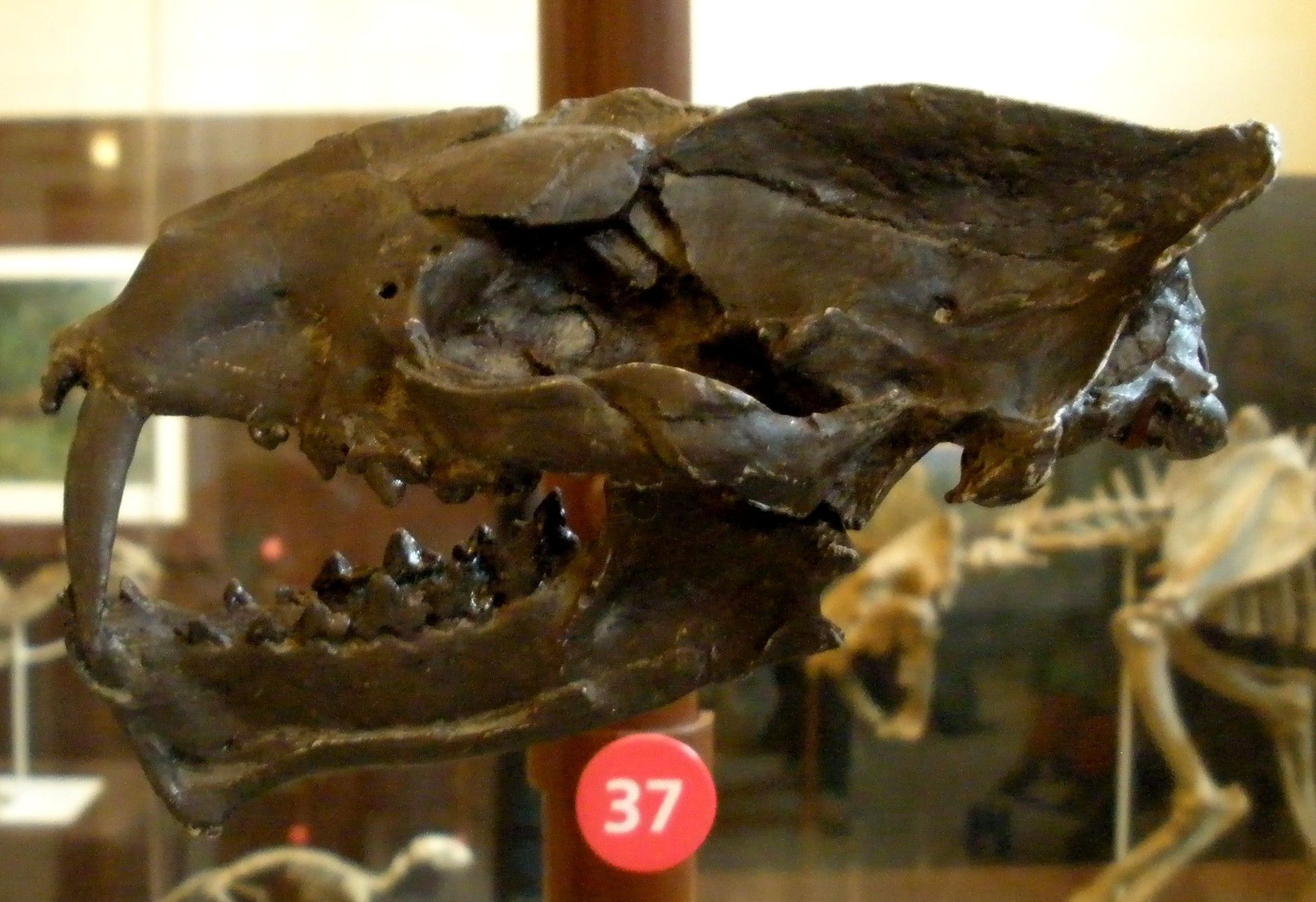
4th saber-tooth instance: Machaeroidinae (Oxyaenidae, Oxyaenodonta, Pan-Carnivora) – Machaeroides eoten skull

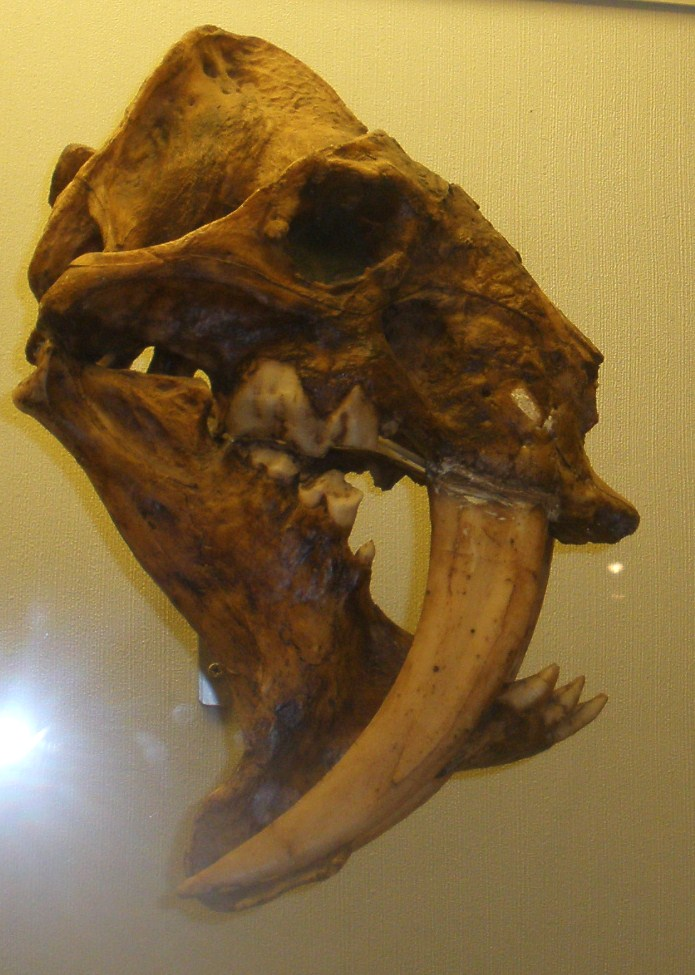
5th saber-tooth instance: Nimravidae (Feliformia, Carnivora, Carnivoraformes) – Barbourofelis fricki skull

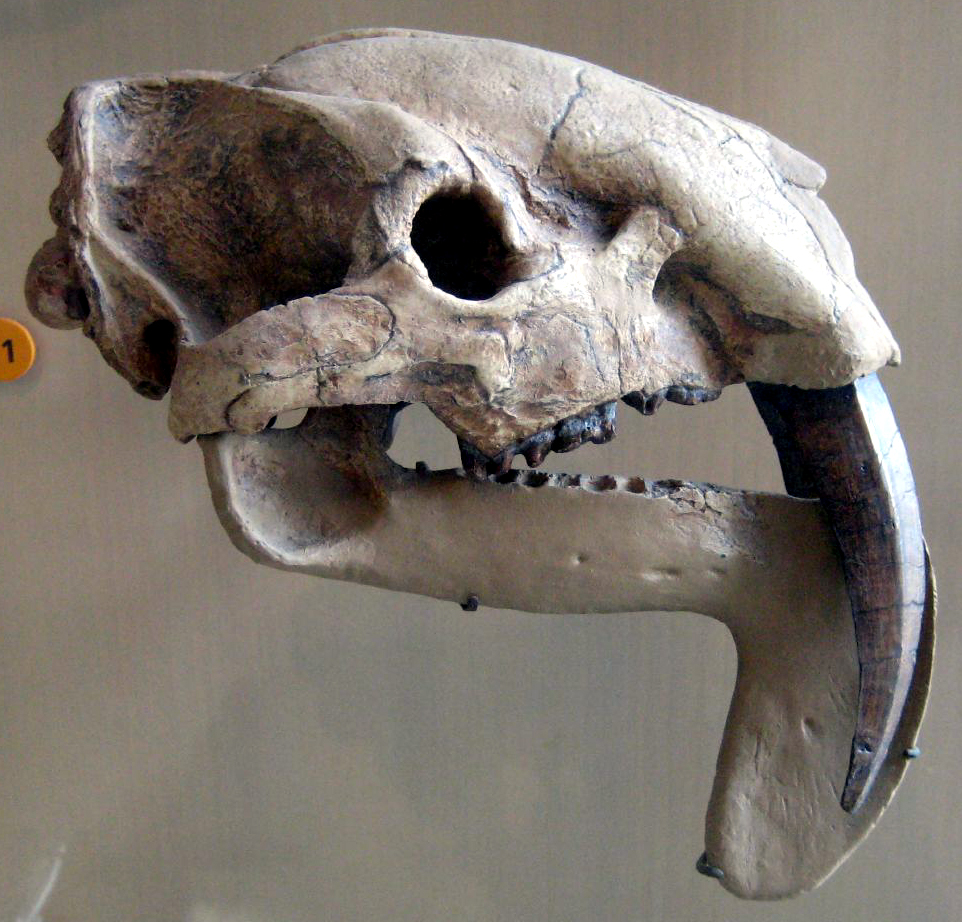
6th saber-tooth instance: Thylacosmilidae (Thylacosmiliformes, Borhyaenoidea, Sparassodonta) – Thylacosmilus atrox skull

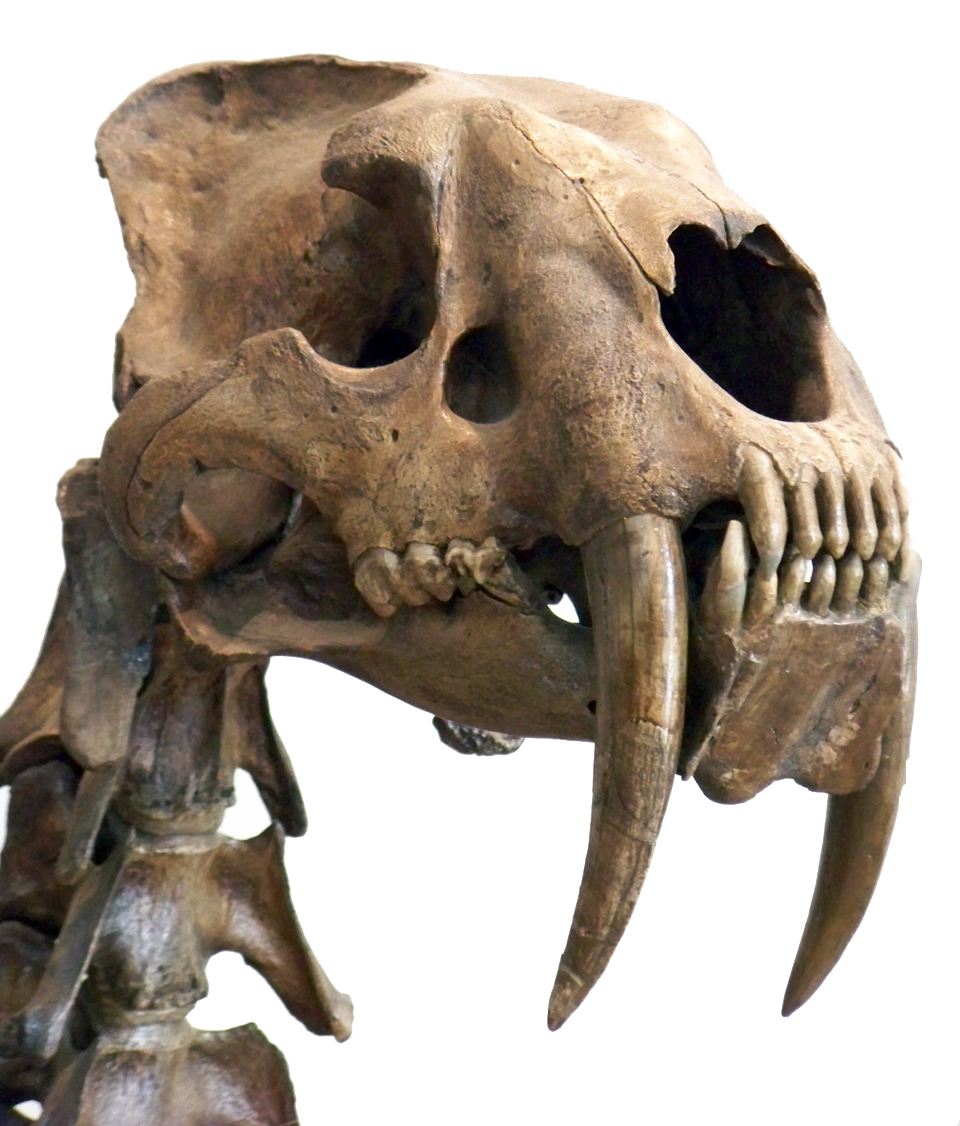
7th saber-tooth instance: Machairodontinae (Felidae, Feliformia, Carnivora) – Smilodon fatalis skull and upper cervical vertebrae

== Morphology ==
=== Size ===
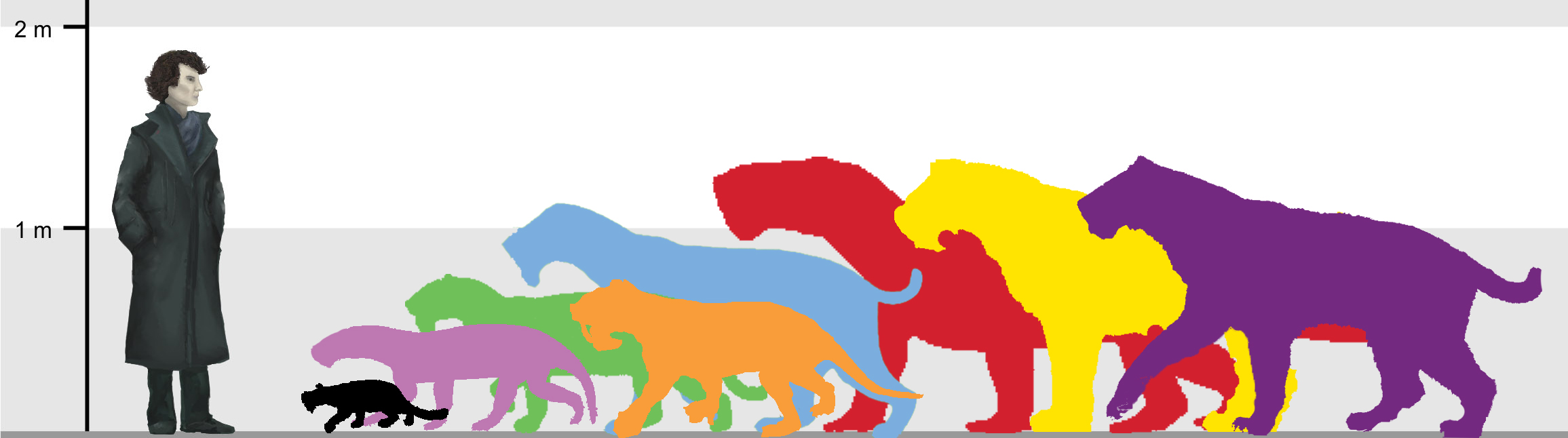
Size comparison of multiple sabertooth predators

Sabertooth predators vary widely in size, with some of the smallest known sabertooth predators, such as Eofelis edwardsii, Eusmilus cerebralis, and Lycaenops omatus, only being about the size of a bobcat or medium sized dog.

But many sabertooth predators have been noted to have reached larger sizes. Thylacosmilids were some of the largest metatherian predators with the smallest genus, Anachlysictis, weighing between 18–22 kilograms (40–49 lb). Thylacosmilus was one of the largest known thylacosmilid, standing 60 cm (2 ft 0 in) at the shoulders and weighing 41–150 kg (90–331 lb) based on various regressions. The closely related Pampaluctor calibar was noted to have been even larger than Thylacosmilus weighing 100 kg (220 lb). Among machairodonts, Smilodon fatalis was estimated to have stood 100 cm (3.3 ft) at the shoulders and weighed 160–280 kg (350–620 lb), while Homotherium stood 90–110 cm (3.0–3.6 ft) at the shoulders and weighed 200–250 kg (440–550 lb). Barbourofelis fricki, the largest known nimravid, was hypothesized to have been a lion-sized predator, standing 90 cm (2 ft 11 in) at the shoulders and weighing 256 kg (564 lb). ^{Including supplementary materials}

The largest gorgonopsianns, Inostrancevia latifrons, was estimated to have measured 3.5 m (11 ft) in length and could've weighed 300 kg (660 lb). Among gorgonopsians, only Rubidgea rivaled it in size. The largest machairodonts were of some of the largest known felids. Smilodon populator was estimated to have stood 120 cm (47 in) at the shoulders and typically weighed 220–360 kg (490–790 lb), with the large males weighing 436 kg (961 lb). Within the Amphimachairodus genus, Amphimachairodus horribilis is estimated to have weighed 405 kg (893 lb). In addition, the largest species within the genus, Amphimachairodus kabir, was estimated to have weighed 350–490 kg (770–1,080 lb).

=== Anatomy ===
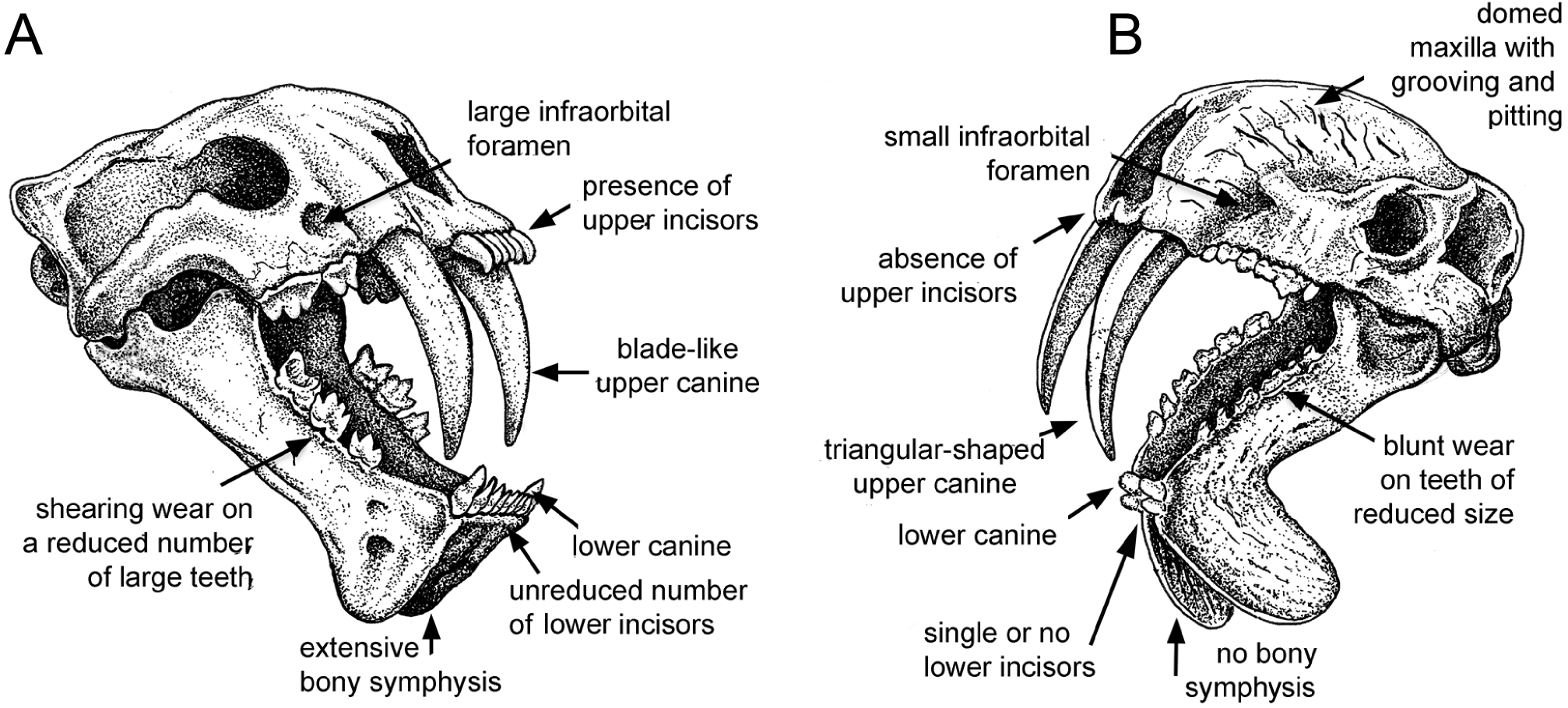
Comparison of the skulls of the two saber toothed mammals Megantereon and Thylacosmilus

A notable feature among the various clades of sabertoothed therapsids is their noticeably robust forelimbs. Postcranial analysis on Gorgonops found its forelimbs to have been rather robust, while its hindlimbs were slender. In general, the postcranial anatomy of gorgonopsians was rather conservative. Some machairodonts, such as Megantereon and Smilodon, were more robust than modern day felids. Humeral length regressions by Sorkin (2008) found that Thylacosmilus fell below the 95% prediction interval from Felinae than Smilodon, Panthera spelaea, and Panthera atrox, suggesting it had a more robust humeri than any felid. Therrien (2005) found the leopard-sized Barbourofelis morrisi had a crural index to the much larger Smilodon fatalis. However, its lower brachi index was much lower than the machairodont being closer to that of that of ambulators. This suggests Barbourofelis morrisi had similar leverage to the machairodont. The larger species of Barbourofelis were found to have a lower brachi and crural index than Smilodon, suggesting a greater power output of the limbs.

On the other hand, Homotherium forelimbs were less powerfully built, being narrow and intermediate between the forelimbs of cheetahs and lions.

== Paleobiology ==
=== Diet ===
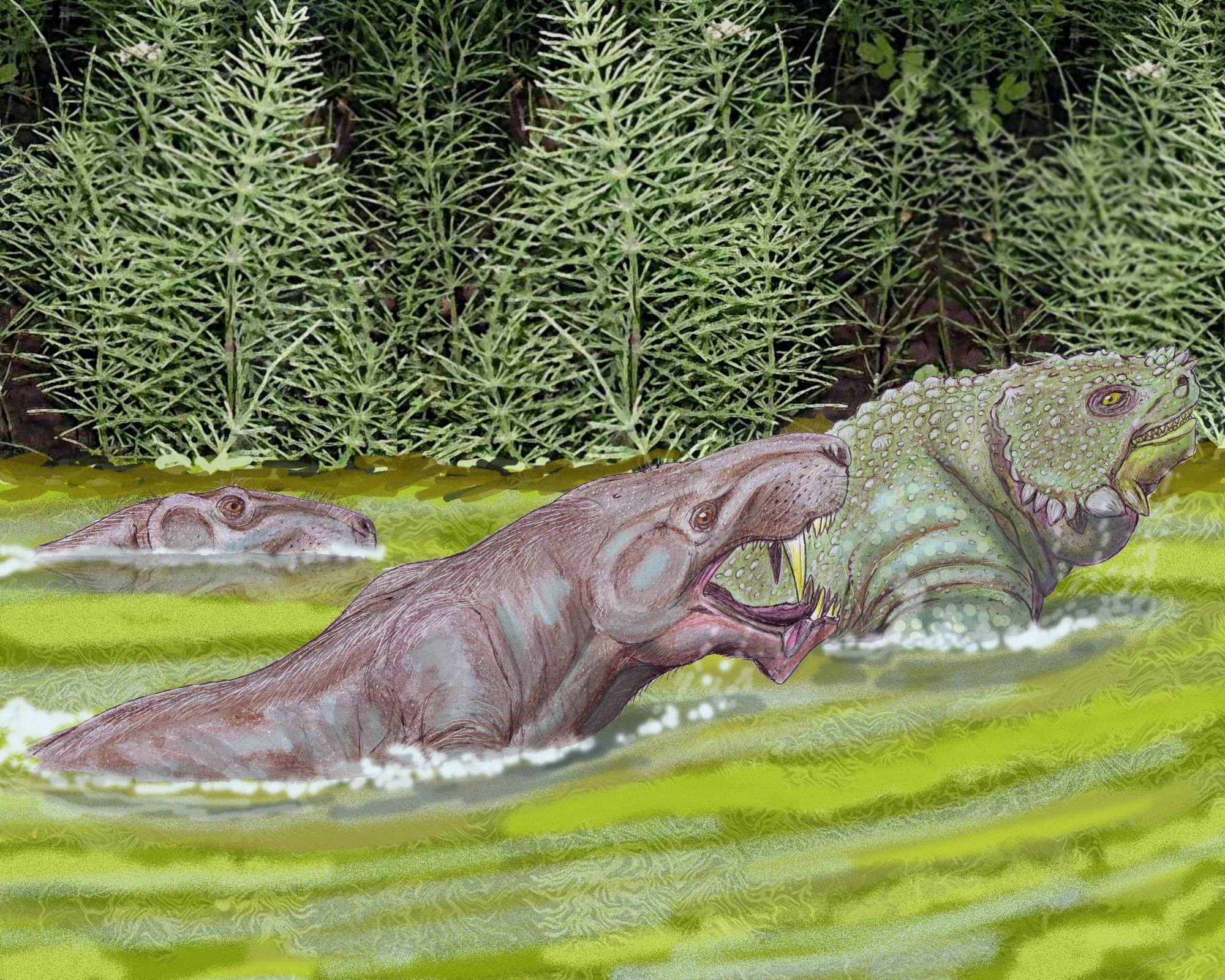
Restoration of two Inostrancevia latifrons chasing a Scutosaurus

All sabertooth predators are hypercarnivores with their dentition specialized for only consuming flesh and lost the ability to consume other items such as plants and bone. Large gorgonopsians, such as Inostrancevia, were thought to have hunted large contemporary tetrapods, such as dicynodonts and pareiasaurs. Within Gratkorn, Albanosmilus jourdani may have hunted equids, suids, and palaeomerycids based on coprolites; additional fossil evidence suggests it may have occasionally scavenged on Deinotherium. Due to the robustness of its forelimbs, it was hypothesized that Barbourofelis loverum could've hunted prey larger than itself, such as Teleoceras and Gomphotherium. Nimravides catocopis was thought to have preferred hunting prey weighing 413–1,386.3 kg (911–3,056 lb), with the largest prey weighing 1.6 t (3,500 lb), although it may not have been a large prey specialist. Based on regressions, it has been hypothesized that a 436 kg (961 lb) Smilodon populator was capable of taking on prey up to 3 t (3.0 long tons; 3.3 short tons), with a pack potentially being capable of taking down fully grown megaherbivores such as Megatherium and Notiomastodon.

Isotopic analysis has been done on multiple sabertooth predators, which have recovered their preferred prey. Within the Quehué and Salinas Grandes de Hidalgo localities, Thylacosmilus preyed upon grazers, such notoungulates in C3 open areas, as well as litopterns, and large rodents.

Within the Venta Micena locality of southeast Spain found evidence of niche partitioning between Homotherium and Megantereon, with the former hunting in more open habitats and hunting prey such as the equine Equus altidens, bison, and juvenile Mammuthus meridionalis. On the other hand, Megantereon hunted in more forested habitats and focused on prey such as Equus altidens, the muskox-relative Soergelia, and the giant deer Praemegaceros. The Turkana Basin of Kenya also found evidence of machairodonts hunting in different habitats. Megantereon hunted in woody habitats and focused on prey weighing 72 kg (159 lb); which included the antelopes Aepyceros, Antidorcas recki, Megalotragus, Kobus sigmoidalis and Tragelaphus, the swines Kolpochoerus limnetes and Metridiochoerus andrewsi, and the three-toed equine Eurygnathohippus ethiopicum. On the other, Homotherium hunted in open habitats focusing on prey weighing 294 kg (648 lb); which included antelopes such as Megalotragus, Kobus sigmoidalis, and Tragelaphus, swines Kolpochoerus limnetes, Nyanzachoerus kanamensis, and Metridiochoerus andrewsi, the three-toed equine Eurygnathohippus ethiopicum, and the extinct giraffe Giraffa pygmaea.

In Swartkrans cave of South Africa, isotopic analysis suggests in this locality, Megantereon hunted hominins, including Paranthropus robustus, baboons, as well early Homo.

=== Predatory behavior ===
Kammerer (2016) noted despite their large canines, most gorgonopsians probably lacked the other specializations found in true saber-toothed predator ecomorphs due to cranial morphology convergences with head-focused predators such as theropods. He noted only two gorgonopsians, Smilesaurus and Inostrancevia, had exceptionally large canines and may have been closer functional analogues to later sabertooths. However, postcranial analysis on Gorgonops suggests gorgonopsians were using their powerful forelimbs to capture prey before using their large canines, suggesting this hunting method was more widespread than Kammerer (2016) hypothesized.

It was initially hypothesized that sabertoothed predators were more adapted for hunting relatively larger prey, including megaherbivores. However, this hypothesis has been questioned by experts. Andersson et al. (2011) found that for saber-tooth cats, the depth of the killing bite decreases dramatically with increasing prey size. The extended gape of saber-toothed cats results in a considerable increase in bite depth when biting into prey with a radius of less than 10 cm. For the saber-tooth, this size-reversed functional advantage suggests predation on species within a similar size range to those attacked by present-day carnivorans, rather than megaherbivores as previously believed.

Antón (2013) pointed out that the prey of the large gorgonopsians were smaller than them, not ten times larger. Additionally, given their large sizes, they weren't the most abundant potential prey in most of their ecosystems. In comparison, medium-sized prey, such as ungulates (e.g. bovids and horses), were more plentiful and were the more ideal prey for sabertooth predators. Lautenschlager et al. (2020) found that the effective jaw gape in most sabertooths was restricted between 45° and 65°, furthermore proving not all sabertooths were large prey specialists. Their analysis found majority of gorgonopsians had a jaw gape below 80° and effective jaw gape below 60°, suggesting a specialization towards similar sized or smaller prey instead of larger prey. On the other hand, nimravids generally showed high jaw gapes, with majority of taxa wide jaw gape of over 90°, combined with little bending strength values over time suggests they have an intermediate killing strategy towards larger prey.

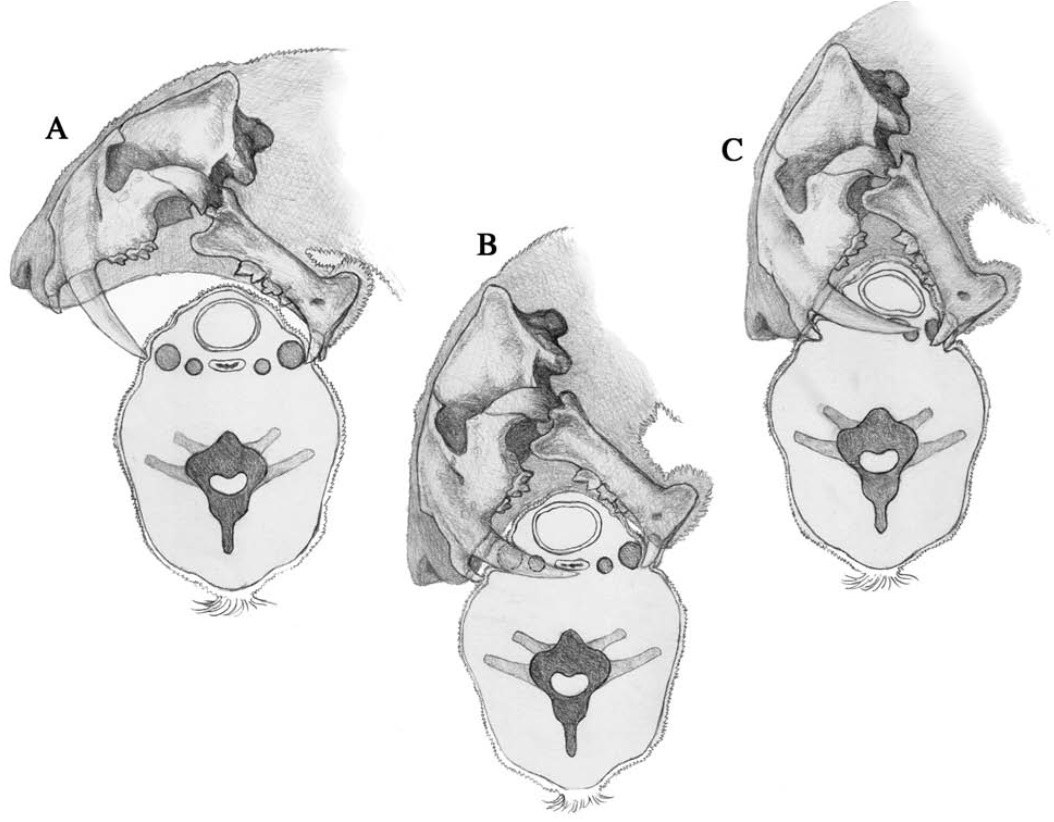
Diagram of Megantereon performing a killing "canine shear bite" on the throat (orientated bottom up) of a prey animal, penetrating the esophagus and major blood vessels. Artwork by Mauricio Anton.

A disputing view of the cat's hunting technique and ability is presented by C. K. Brain in The Hunters or the Hunted?, in which he attributes the cat's prey-killing abilities to its large neck muscles rather than its jaws. Large cats use both the upper and lower jaw to bite down and bring down the prey. The strong bite of the jaw is accredited to the strong temporalis muscle that attach from the skull to the coronoid process of the jaw. The larger the coronoid process, the larger the muscle that attaches there, so the stronger the bite. As C.K. Brain points out, the saber-toothed cats had a greatly reduced coronoid process and therefore a disadvantageously weak bite. The cat did, however, have an enlarged mastoid process, a muscle attachment at the base of the skull, which attaches to neck muscles. According to C.K. Brain, the saber-tooth would use a "downward thrust of the head, powered by the neck muscles" to drive the large upper canines into the prey. This technique was "more efficient than those of true cats".

The similarity in all these unrelated families involves the convergent evolution of the saber-like canines as a hunting adaptation. Meehan et al. note that it took around 8 million years for a new type of saber-toothed cat to fill the niche of an extinct predecessor in a similar ecological role; this has happened at least four times with different families of animals developing this adaptation. Although the adaptation of the saber-like canines made these creatures successful, it seems that the shift to obligate carnivorism, along with co-evolution with large prey animals, led the saber-toothed cats of each time period to extinction. As per Van Valkenburgh, the adaptations that made saber-toothed cats successful also made the creatures vulnerable to extinction. In her example, trends toward an increase in size, along with greater specialization, acted as a "macro-evolutionary ratchet": when large prey became scarce or extinct, these creatures would be unable to adapt to smaller prey or consume other sources of food, and would be unable to reduce their size so as to need less food.

Janis et al. (2020) has been suggested that Thylacosmilus differed radically from its placental counterparts in possessing differently shaped canines and lacking incisors. This suggests that it was not ecologically analogous to other saber-teeth and possibly an entrail specialist. Another study has found that other saber toothed species similarly had diverse lifestyles and that superficial anatomical similarities obscure them.

=== Social behavior ===
A gorgonopsian, comparable to Eriphostoma microdon in size, showed signs of a healed bite mark with an embedded tooth in its snout. Based on mammalian healing capabilities, the specimen was bitten 2–9 weeks before its death. The absence of a drainage channel for pus or any other trace of infection suggests the bite wasn't the cause of death. Experts hypothesized it was an example of social biting, meant to signal dominance and power within the hierarchy. Machairodonts, such as Megantereon and Promegantereon, were thought to have been solitary predators. In the case of Promegantereon, it was due to the lack of cubs found in the predator traps. However, given its level of sexual dimorphism, adults had a higher degree of tolerance for one another and young adults would've inhabited their mothers' territory after maturing.

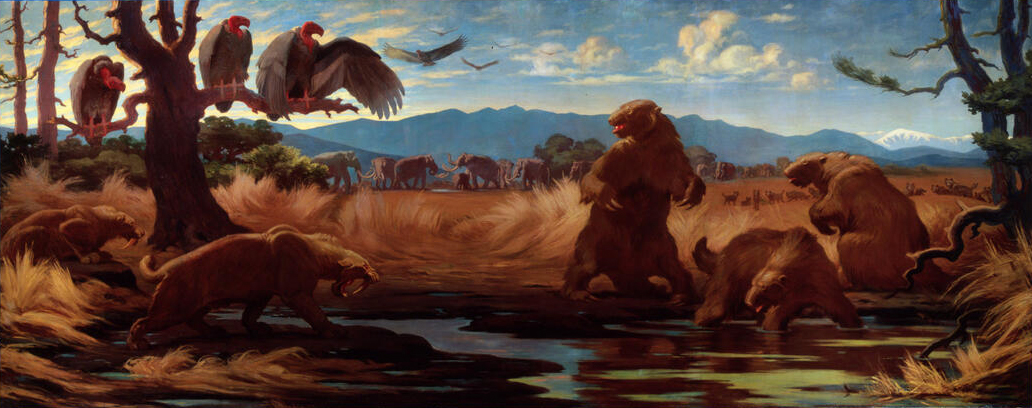
Smilodon fatalis pair approaching a group of the ground sloth Paramylodon, one mired, at the La Brea Tar Pits, by Knight, 1921

However, some machairdonts have been speculated to have been social predators. Carbone et al. (2009) hypothesized that based on the ratio of juveniles to adults and high abundance of specimens found in the La Brea Tar Pits, Smilodon was a social carnivore, much like modern lions. However, some experts have questioned the evidence of Smilodon being gregarious. Kiffner (2009) questioned Carbone et al. (2009) as their analysis other factors such as body mass (heavier animals are more likely to get stuck than lighter ones), intelligence (some social animals, like the American lion, may have avoided the tar because they were better able to recognize the hazard), lack of visual and olfactory lures, the type of audio lure, and the length of the distress calls (the actual distress calls of the trapped prey animals would have lasted longer than the calls used in the study). Additionally, solitary felids, such as tigers and cougars, been known to aggregate around carcasses. The authors of the original study argued while the playback experiments and calls in the tar pits would've been different, it wouldn't have overturned their conclusions. Furthermore, they argued weight and intelligence would not likely affect the results as lighter carnivores are far more numerous than heavy herbivores and the social (and seemingly intelligent) dire wolf is also found in the pits. However, they do not rule out the possibility that Smilodon may have been solitary in part of its distribution.

Pathological analysis has also been used as evidence to support gregariousness in Smilodon, although experts have questioned this as cats can recover quickly from even severe bone damage and an injured Smilodon could survive if it had access to water. However, dental injuries suggests that injured individuals consumed softer flesh than non-injured individuals. The consideration of individuals surviving a good amount of time, it may suggest that Smilodon may have formed social groups. Additionally, a Smilodon fatalis specimen was suffering from hip dysplasia at a young age but managed survived to adulthood. This suggests that it could not have survived to adulthood without aid from a social group, as this individual was unable to hunt or defend its territory due to the severity of its congenital issue. Two Smilodon populator skulls from Argentina show seemingly fatal, unhealed wounds which appear to have been caused by the canines of another Smilodon (though it cannot be ruled out they were caused by kicking prey). If caused by intraspecific fighting, it may also indicate that they had social behavior which could lead to death, as seen in some modern felines (as well as indicating that the canines could penetrate bone).

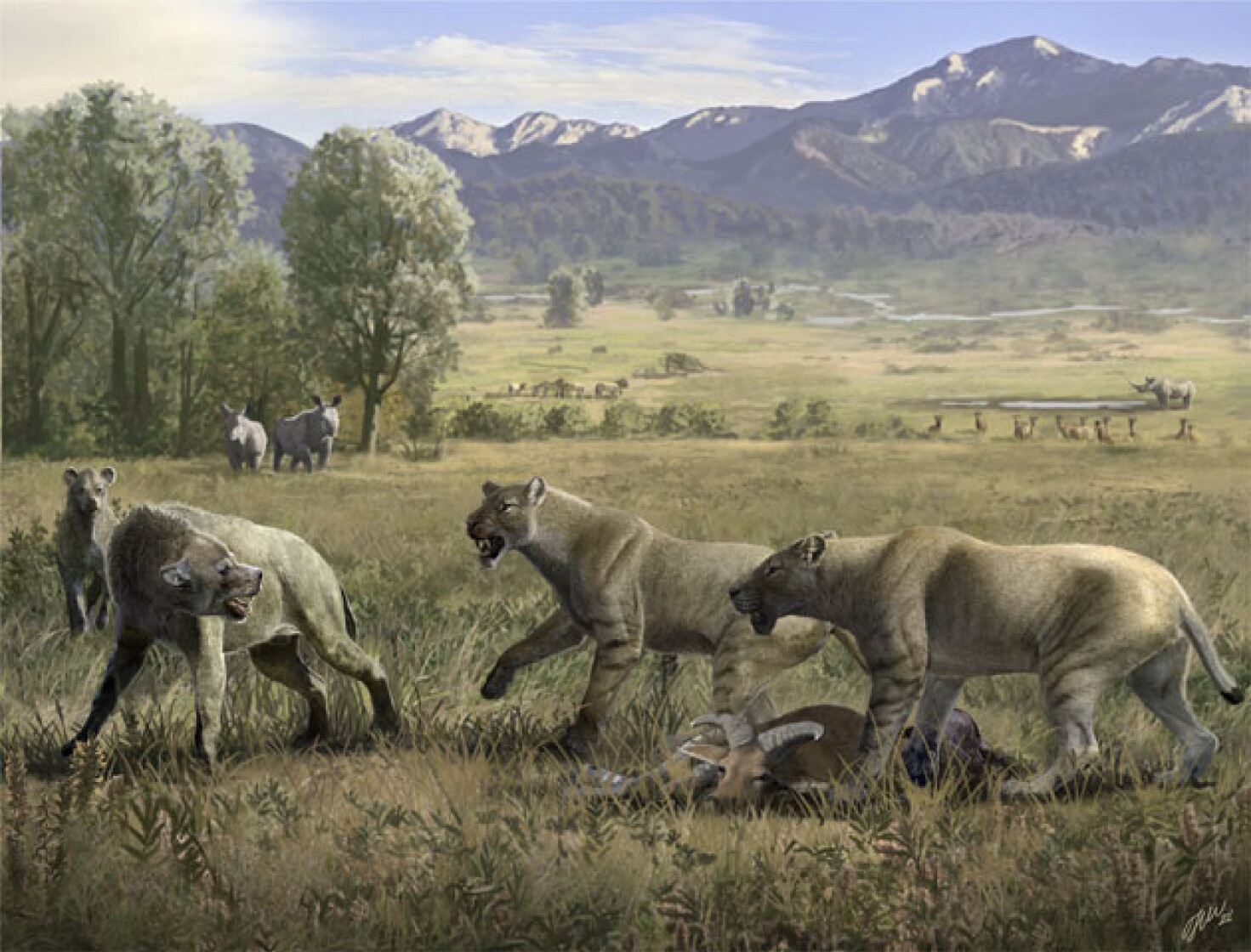
A pair of Amphimachairodus hezhengensis confronting a pair of Dinocrocuta gigantea

Amphimachairodus hezhengensis was believed to have been gregarious due to its adaptation of living in open environments such as stereo vision, which would've aided in prey identification and cooperative hunting. Additionally, evidence of healed pathological forepaw suggests evidence of partner care, and the abundant of large carnivorans present in Linxia Basin, which likely prove the rapid morphological evolution and gregariousness. Pathological analysis also found that Machairodus aphanistus was likely gregarious due to specimens surviving severe injuries such as a broken jaw. Solitary felids with high levels of sexual dimorphism such as leopards typically die before severe injuries managed to heal, being unable to hunt for themselves or sustain themselves on carrion long-term. Lions, however, have a greater chance of survival, due to living in prides. Considering the high levels of sexual dimorphism in this species of Machairodus, this would likely indicate higher levels of intolerance to other individuals within their territory. This would suggest males likely formed coalitions of two or three individuals, while females were solitary predators. Homotherium was thought to have been a gregarious animal based on its anatomy, as well as fossil and genetic evidence.

== Taxonomy ==
Gorgonopsians were believed to have split off from eutheriodonts either Kungurian stage of the Early Permian or the Roadian stage of the Middle Permian. Following their split, basal therocephalians diverged from eutherocephalians sometime in the Roadian or Wordian stage. The relationship between therocephalians and cynodonts, the lineage that includes mammals, has been debated by experts. If recovered as a clade, therocephalians were thought to have split off from cynodonts during the Roadian or Wordian stage of the Middle Permian.

Among mammals, metatherians split off from placentals during the Mesozoic between the earliest Cretaceous and latest Triassic. Thylacosmilids were believed to diverged from proborhyenids during the Eocene epoch. By the early Paleocene, oxyaenids already diverged from carnivoraformes. Following the caniform-feliform split, nimravids diverged from other feliforms during the Eocene epoch. The machairodonts would split off from felids during the Early Miocene.

- Clade Therapsida
  - Clade: †Gorgonopsia
    - Genus: †Nochnitsa
    - Genus: †Viatkogorgon
      - Clade: †Russian clade
        - Genus: †Sauroctonus
        - Genus: †Suchogorgon
        - Subfamily †Inostranceviinae
      - Clade: †African clade
        - †Smilesaurus
        - Family: †Phorcyidae
          - Genus: †Jirahgorgon
          - Genus: †Phorcys
        - Subfamily †Rubidgeinae
  - Clade: †Therocephalia
    - Family: †Lycosuchidae
    - Genus: †Gorynychus
    - Clade: †Scylacosauria
      - Family: †Scylacosauridae
  - Class: Mammalia
    - Clade: Metatheria
      - Order: †Sparassodonta
        - Family: †Thylacosmilidae
    - Subclass: Placentalia
      - Clade: Pan-Carnivora
        - Order: †Oxyaenodonta
          - Family: †Oxyaenidae
            - Subfamily †Machaeroidinae
              - Genus: †Apataelurus
              - Genus: †Diegoaelurus
              - Genus: †Machaeroides
        - Order Carnivora
          - Suborder Feliformia ('cat-like' carnivores)
            - Family: †Nimravidae (false-saber toothed cats)
              - Subfamily †Barbourofelinae
              - Subfamily †Hoplophoninae
              - Subfamily †Nimravinae
            - Family Felidae (true cats)
              - Subfamily †Machairodontinae (true saber-toothed cats)
                - Tribe †Homotherini
                - Tribe †Metailurini
                - Tribe †Smilodontini

=== Phylogeny ===
 Cladogram of Gorgonopsia based on Macungo et al. (2026):

- †Gorgonopsia
  - Nochnitsa
  - - Viatkogorgon
    - - "Russian clade"
        - Suchogorgon
        - - Sauroctonus
          - - Pravoslavlevia
            - Inostrancevia
      - "African clade"
        - - Eriphostoma
          - - Gorgonops
            - - Jirahgorgon
              - Phorcys
        - - Cynariops
          - - Lycaenops
            - - - Arctops
                - - DA21/17-01-01
                    (Port des Canonge Fm. gorgonopsian)
                  - Smilesaurus
              - - Arctognathus
                - Rubidgeinae
                  - Aelurognathus
                  - - Ruhuhucerberus
                    - - - Sycosaurus
                        - Rubidgeini
                          - Leontosaurus
                          - - Dinogorgon
                            - - Clelandina
                              - Rubidgea

Cladogram of therocephalians based on Liu & Abdala (2023):

- Theriodontia
  - Gorgonopsia
  - Eutheriodontia
    - Cynodontia
      - Charassognathus
      - - Dvinia
        - Procynosuchus
    - Therocephalia
      - Lycosuchus
      - - Gorynychus
        - - Scylacosauridae
            - Alopecodon
            - - Pardosuchus
              - - Scylacosaurus
                - Ictidosaurus
                - - Pristerognathus
                  - Glanosuchus
          - Eutherocephalia

Cladogram of Borhyaenoidae according to del Campo et al. (2026):

- †Borhyaenoidea
  - †Lycopsis spp.
  - - †Thylacosmiliformes
      - †Dimartinia pristina
      - - IGM 251108
          (unnamed La Venta taxon)
        - †Thylacosmilidae
          - - †Pampaluctor calibar
            - †Thylacosmilus atrox
          - - †Anachlysictis gracilis
            - †Patagosmilus goini
    - - UF 27881
        (unnamed Honda Group taxon)
      - - †Prothylacynus patagonicus
        - - †Pharsophorus lacerans
          - - †Eomakhaira molossus
            - - †Proborhyaenidae
              - †Borhyaenidae

Cladogram of feliform saber-tooths based on Piras et al. (2013). Saber-toothed groups are marked with background colors.

- - - Nimravidae ("false saber‑toothed cats")
      - - - - Dinictis felina
            - Pogonodon platycopis
          - - - - Eusmilus
                  - Eusmilus olsontau
                  - - Eusmilus villebramarensis
                    - Eusmilus cerebralis
                - Hoplophoneus dakotensis
              - Hoplophoneus primaevus
              - Hoplophoneus occidentalis
            - Nanosmilus kurténi
        - Eofelis edwardsii
      - Nimravus brachyops
  - - Haplogale media
    - - Barbourofelidae ("false saber‑toothed cats")
        - Barbourofelis
          - - - Barbourofelis morrisi
              - Barbourofelis fricki
            - Barbourofelis loveorum
          - Barbourofelis whitfordi
        - Sansanosmilus vallesiensis
      - Felidae
        - - Proailurus lemanensis
          - "Pseudaelurus" (grade)
            - - Hyperailuricitis skinneri
              - - Nimravides
                  - Nimravides pedionomus
                  - Nimravides thinobates
                - Hyperailuricitis intrepidus
              - Hyperailuricitis validus
            - - Pseudaelurus quadridentatus
              - Machairodontinae (saber‑toothed cats)
                - - - Machairodus
                      - Machairodus aphanistus
                      - Machairodus horribilis
                  - - - Amphimachairodus
                        - - Amphimachairodus kurteni
                          - Amphimachairodus kabir
                        - Amphimachairodus giganteus
                    - - Lokotunjailurus emageritus
                      - Homotheriini (scimitar‑toothed cats)
                        - - Dinobastis
                            - Dinobastis serus
                            - Dinobastis venezuelensis
                          - Xenosmilus hodsonae
                        - Homotherium latidens
                - - - Metailurini
                      - Dinofelis
                        - - Dinofelis petteri
                          - Dinofelis paleoonca
                        - Dinofelis cristata
                      - Metailurus
                        - Metailurus major
                        - Metailurus parvulus
                  - - Promegantereon ogygia
                    - Smilodontini (dirk‑toothed cats)
                      - Megantereon
                        - - - Megantereon whitei
                            - Megantereon cultridens
                          - Megantereon ekidoit
                        - Megantereon hesperus
                      - Smilodon
                        - - Smilodon fatalis
                          - Smilodon populator
                        - Smilodon gracilis
            - - Styriofelis
                - Styriofelis lorteti
                - Styriofelis turnauensis
              - Felinae sensu lato (includes all extant pantherines and felines)

== See also ==
- Clouded leopard, the "modern-day sabre-tooth"
- Enchodus, "the saber-toothed herring"
- Sabertooth blenny
- Sabertooth fish
- Sabertooth salmon
- Saber-toothed frog
- Saber-toothed squirrel
- Saber-toothed whale
- Siberian musk deer
