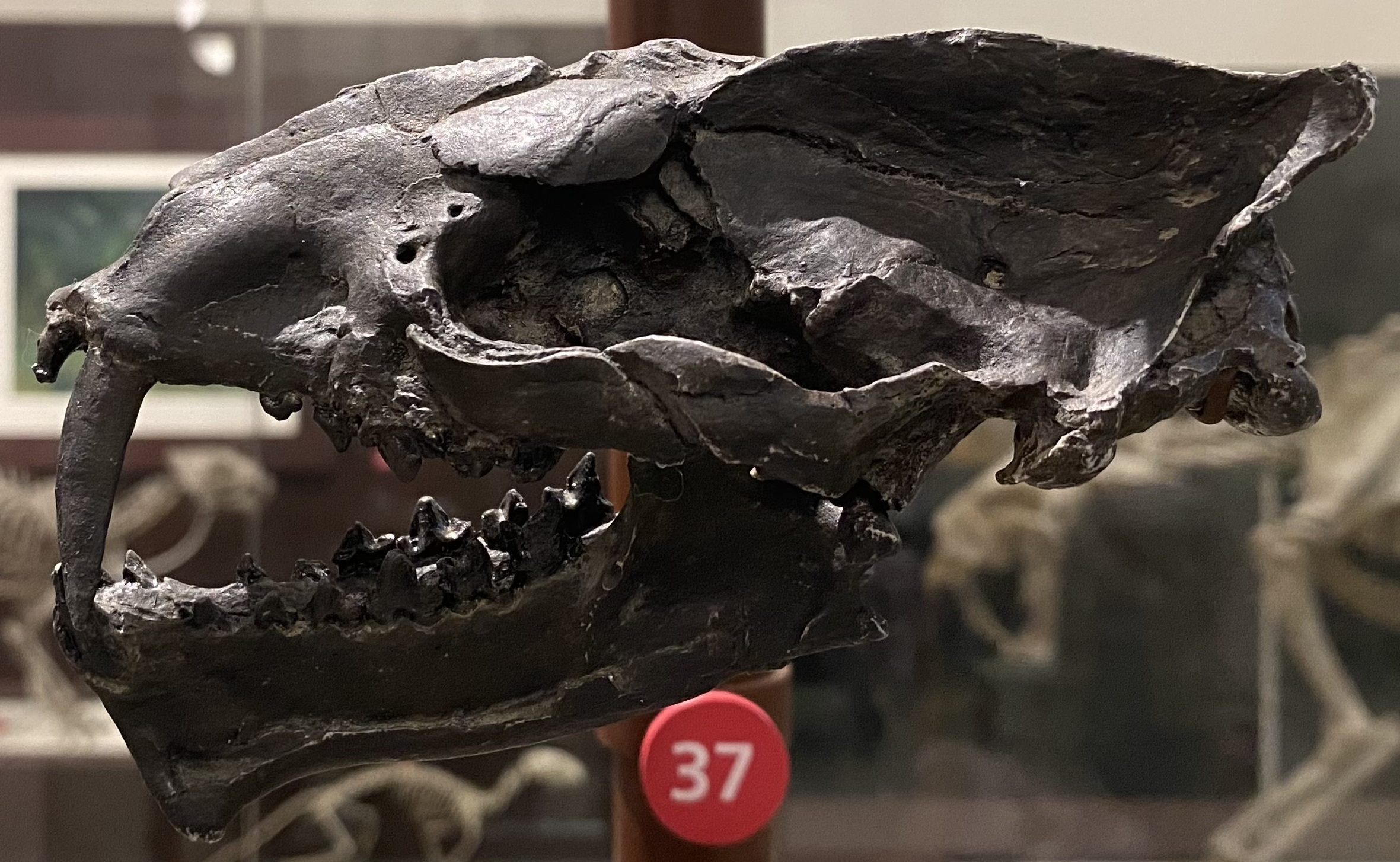
- Machaeroides eothen skull cast at the American Museum of Natural History
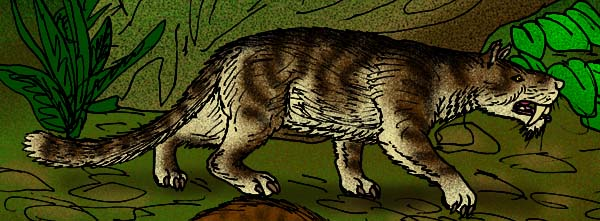
- Machaeroides eothen restoration

Scientific classification
- Kingdom: Animalia
- Phylum: Chordata
- Class: Mammalia
- Clade: Pan-Carnivora
- Order: †Oxyaenodonta
- Family: †Oxyaenidae
- Subfamily: †Machaeroidinae
- Genus: †Machaeroides; Matthew, 1909

Type species
- †Machaeroides eothen Matthew, 1909

Species
- †M. eothen (Matthew, 1909); †M. simpsoni (Dawson, 1986)
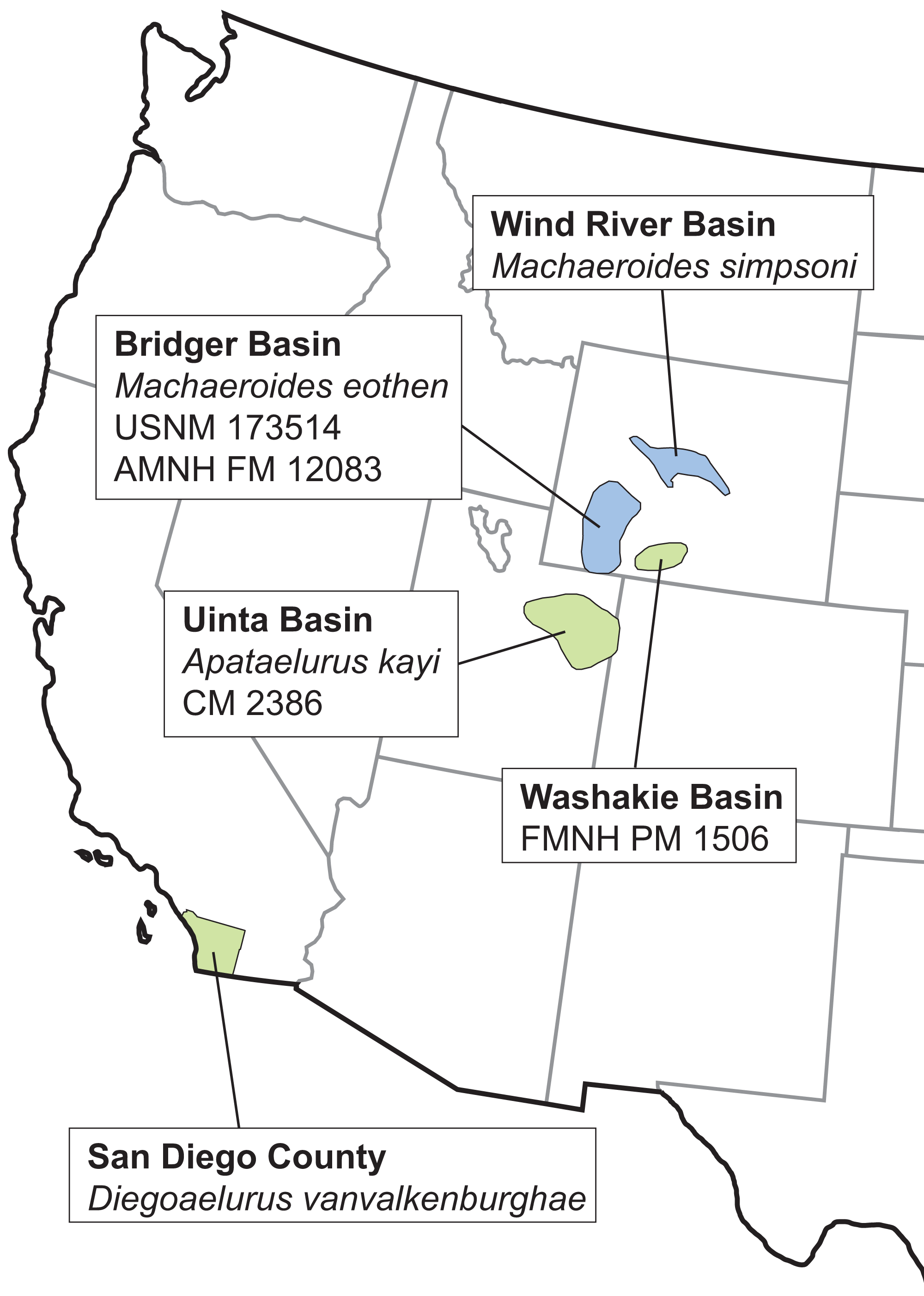
- A map showing the fossil finds of Machaeroides as well as other machaeroidinid genera.

= Machaeroides =

Machaeroides Temporal range: Early to Middle Eocene (Wasatchian to Bridgerian) 52.4–46.2 Ma

Extinct genus of carnivores

Machaeroides ("dagger-like") is an extinct genus of sabre-toothed predatory placental mammals from the extinct subfamily Machaeroidinae within the extinct family Oxyaenidae, that lived in North America (Wyoming) from the early to middle Eocene.

== Description ==
Size comparison between the two Machaeroides species

Both species bore a passing or superficial resemblance to a very small, dog-sized saber-toothed cat. Machaeroides could be distinguished from actual saber-toothed cats by their more-elongated skulls, and their plantigrade stance. Machaeroides species are distinguished from the closely related Apataelurus by the fact that the former genus had smaller saber-teeth. Despite its small size, the genus Machairoides was well-equipped to hunt prey larger than itself, such as the small, primitive horses and rhinoceroses present at the time, as it was equipped with saber teeth and powerful forelimbs to subdue prey.

M. eothen weighed an estimated 10–14 kg (22–31 lb), thus matching in size a small Staffordshire Terrier. M. simpsoni was probably smaller.

== Taxonomic placement ==
Its position within the mammals has been in dispute. Experts have been equally divided over whether Machaeroides and its sister-genus, Apataelurus, belong in Oxyaenidae or Hyaenodonta, though as of 2014 the most recent studies favor the former.
