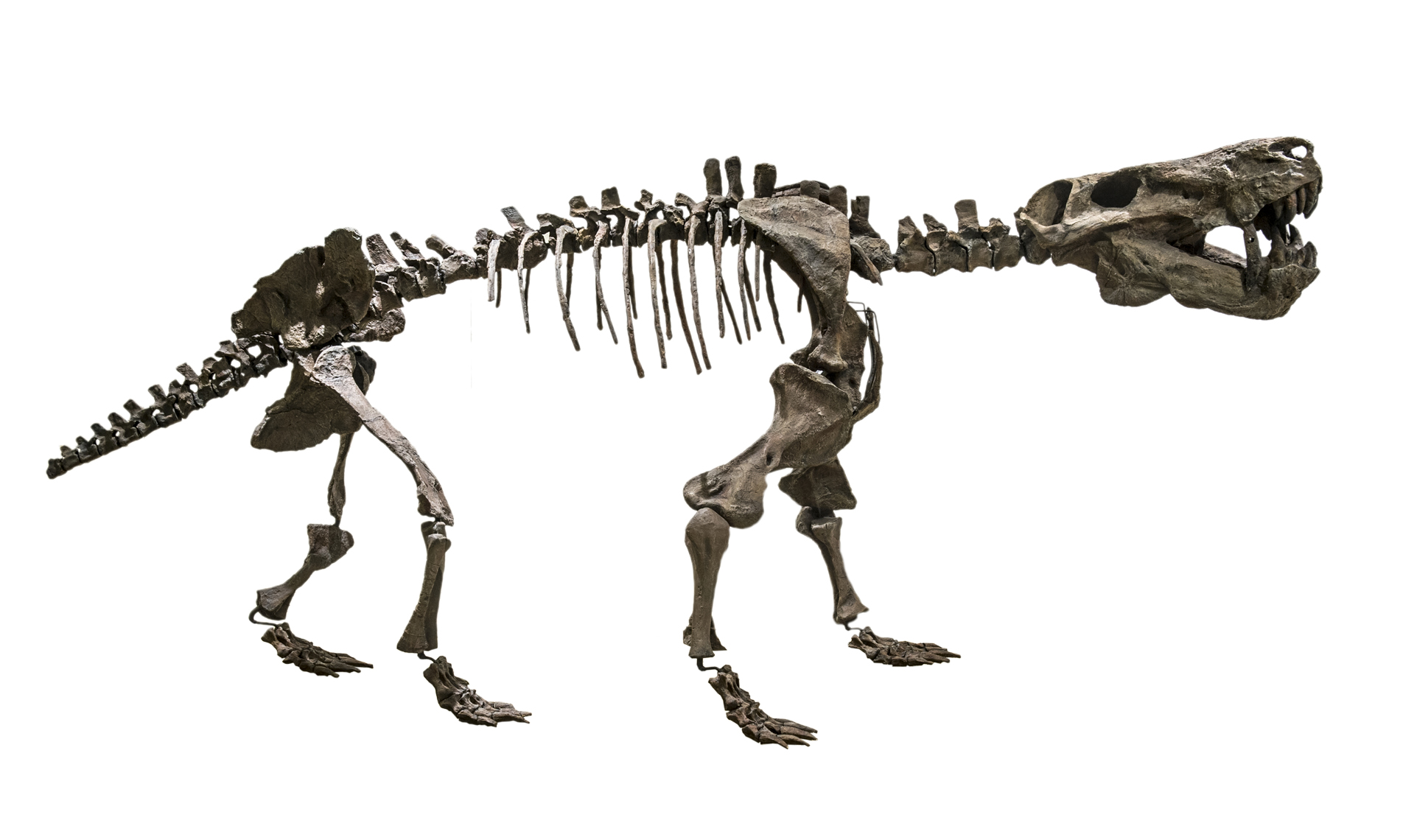
- Mount cast of one of the first two described skeletons of I. alexandri (PIN 1758), exposed at the Museo delle Scienze, Trento, Italy

Scientific classification
- Kingdom: Animalia
- Phylum: Chordata
- Clade: Synapsida
- Clade: Therapsida
- Clade: †Gorgonopsia
- Subfamily: †Inostranceviinae
- Genus: †Inostrancevia; Amalitsky, 1922

Type species
- †Inostrancevia alexandri Amalitsky, 1922

Other species
- I. latifrons Pravoslavlev, 1927; I. uralensis Tatarinov, 1974; I. africana Kammerer et al., 2023

Synonyms
- List of synonyms: Synonyms of genus; Inostranzevia Amalitsky, 1922; Amalitzkia Pravoslavlev, 1927 Synonyms of I. alexandri; I. proclivis Pravoslavlev, 1927 Synonyms of I. latifrons; Amalitzkia vladimiri Pravoslavlev, 1927; Amalitzkia annae Pravoslavlev, 1927; I. vladimiri Vyushkov, 1953

= Inostrancevia =

Inostrancevia Temporal range: Lopingian (Wuchiapingian to Changhsingian), ~256–251.9 Ma

Extinct genus of therapsids

Inostrancevia is an extinct genus of large carnivorous therapsids which lived during the Late Permian in what is now European Russia and Southern Africa. The first-known fossils of this gorgonopsian were discovered in the context of a long series of excavations carried out from 1899 to 1914 in the Northern Dvina, Russia. Among these are two near-complete skeletons embodying the first described specimens of this genus, being also the first gorgonopsian identified in Russia. Several other fossil materials were discovered there, and the various finds led to confusion as to the exact number of valid species, before only two of them were formally recognized, namely I. alexandri and I. latifrons. A third species, I. uralensis, was erected in 1974, but the fossil remains of this taxon are very thin and could come from another genus. More recent research carried out in Southern Africa has discovered specimens identified as belonging to this genus, being classified within the species I. africana. The genus name honors Alexander Inostrantsev, professor of Vladimir P. Amalitsky, the paleontologist who described the taxon.

Possessing a skull measuring approximately 40 to 60 cm (16 to 24 in) long depending on the species, all for a body length reaching 3 to 3.5 m (9.8 to 11.5 ft), Inostrancevia is the largest known gorgonopsian, being rivaled in size only by the genus Rubidgea. It has a broad and elongated skull equipped with large oval-shaped temporal fenestrae. It also has very advanced dentition, possessing large canines, the longest of which can reach 15 cm (5.9 in) and which may have been used to shear the skin of prey. Like most other gorgonopsians, Inostrancevia had a particularly large jaw opening angle, which will have allowed it to inflict fatal bites. Gorgonopsians in general were relatively fast predators, killing their prey by delivering slashing bites with their saber teeth. The skeleton is robustly constructed, but new studies are necessary for a better anatomical description and understanding about its paleobiological functioning.

Gorgonopsians were a group of carnivorous stem mammals with saber teeth that disappeared at the end of the Permian. The first classifications placed Inostrancevia as close to African taxa before 1948, the year in which Friedrich von Huene erected a distinct family, Inostranceviidae. Although this model was mainly followed in the scientific literature of the 20th and early 21st centuries, phylogenetic analysis published since 2018 considers it to belong to a group of derived gorgonopsians of Russian origin, now classified alongside the genera Suchogorgon, Sauroctonus and Pravoslavlevia, this latter and Inostrancevia forming the subfamily Inostranceviinae. Russian and African fossil records show that Inostrancevia lived in river ecosystems containing many tetrapods, where it appears to have been the main predator. These faunas were mainly occupied by dicynodonts and pareiasaurs, which most likely constituted its prey. In the Russian territory, Inostrancevia will have been the only large gorgonopsian present, while it was have been briefly contemporary with the rubidgeines in Tanzania. When the rubidgeines disappeared from South African territory, Inostrancevia occupied the role of apex predator before disappearing in turn during the Permian-Triassic extinction.

== Research history ==
=== Russian discoveries ===
During the 1890s, Russian paleontologist Vladimir Amalitsky discovered freshwater sediments dating from the Upper Permian in Northern Dvina, Arkhangelsk Oblast, northern European Russia. The locality, known as PIN 2005, consists of a creek with sandstone and lens-shaped exposures in a bank escarpment, containing many particularly well-preserved fossil skeletons. This type of fauna from this period, previously known only from South Africa and India, is considered as one of the greatest paleontological discoveries of the late 19th and early 20th centuries. After the preliminary reconnaissance of the place, Amalitsky conducts systematic research with his companion Anna P. Amalitsky. The first excavations began in 1899, and several of her findings where sent to Warsaw, Poland, in order to be prepared there. The exhumations of the fossils then lasted until 1914, when the research stopped due to the start of the World War I. When this event begins, Amalitsky tries to save his collection of fossils residing in Warsaw in order to transfer it to the Nizhny Novgorod oblast. However, the arrival of the October Revolution in 1917 and the changing politics within the country indirectly led to his death in December of the same year. Subsequently, his fossil collection was transferred to Leningrad and became an integral part of the geological department of the city's university. During World War II, part of the fossils from the collection were transferred to the Paleontological Institute of the Russian Academy of Sciences in Moscow.

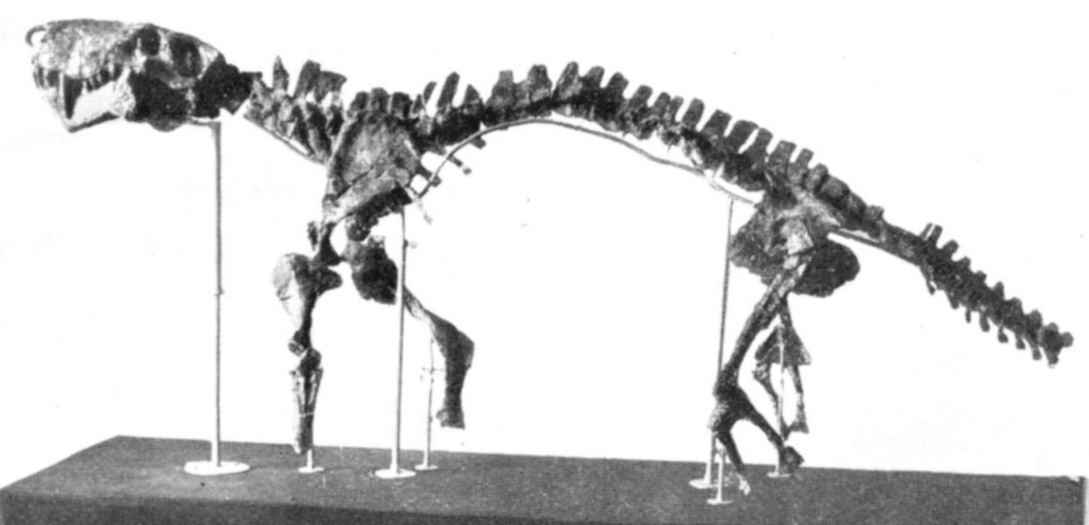
The mounted lectotype skeleton of I. alexandri (PIN 2005/1578)

Among all the fossils Amalitsky described before his death are two remarkably complete skeletons of large gorgonopsians, since cataloged as PIN 1758 and PIN 2005/1578, in which he assigned within the new genus and species Inostranzevia alexandri. The specimen PIN 2005/1578 is later recognized as its lectotype. The taxon represents the first gorgonopsian to be identified in Russia, the fossils also preserving the first known near-complete postcranial remains identified in this group of therapsids. Although the animal was not officially described posthumously until 1922, the use of this name in scientific literature dates back to the beginning of the 20th century, notably in the works of Friedrich von Huene and Edwin Ray Lankester. Taxonomic issues regarding the original naming of the genus are the subject of a study which should be published later. Although the etymology of the genus and type species is not provided in the earliest-known descriptions of the taxon, the full name of the animal is named in honor of the renowned geologist Alexander Inostrantsev, who was one of Amalitsky's teachers. Amalitsky's article generally describes all the fossil discoveries made in the Northern Dvina, and not Inostrancevia itself, the article mentioning that further research on this gorgonopsian was subject to research.

In 1927, one of Amalitsky's colleagues, Pavel Pravoslavlev, wrote two works, including a book, which are the first in-depth descriptions of the fossils today attributed to this taxon. In his works, Pravoslavlev changed the typography of the name "Inostranzevia" to "Inostrancevia". (Note: The latter name had already been changed previously by Samuel Wendell Williston in 1925, but it was not until Pravoslavlev's publications that the taxon was mainly known under this designation.) Although the original name has been used a few times in recent scientific literature, the second term has since entered into universal usage and must be maintained according to the rule of article 33.3.1 of the ICZN. Among the many species of Inostrancevia erected and described on its part, only I. latifrons is found to be valid. The holotype of this species, cataloged PIN 2005/1857, consists of a large skull missing the lower jaw, discovered in the same locality as that of the first known specimens of I. alexandri. Another skull was also discovered in the same locality as the holotype, while an incomplete skeleton was discovered in the village of Zavrazhye, located in Vladimir Oblast. The specific name latifrons comes from the Latin latus "broad" and frōns "forehead", in reference to the size and the more robust cranial constitution than that of I. alexandri. In 1974, Leonid Petrovich Tatarinov carried out a large revision of the theriodonts then known in the USSR. In his work, he revises the validity of the taxa erected by Pravoslavlev and describes a third species of Inostrancevia, I. uralensis, on the basis of part of the skull. The holotype specimen, cataloged as PIN 2896/1, consists of a left basioccipital having been discovered in the locality of Blumental-3, located in the Orenburg Oblast. The specific name uralensis refers to the Ural River, where the holotype specimen of the taxon was found. However, due to its poor fossil preservation of this species, Tatarinov argues that it is possible that I. uralensis could belong to a new genus of large gorgonopsians.

=== African discoveries ===
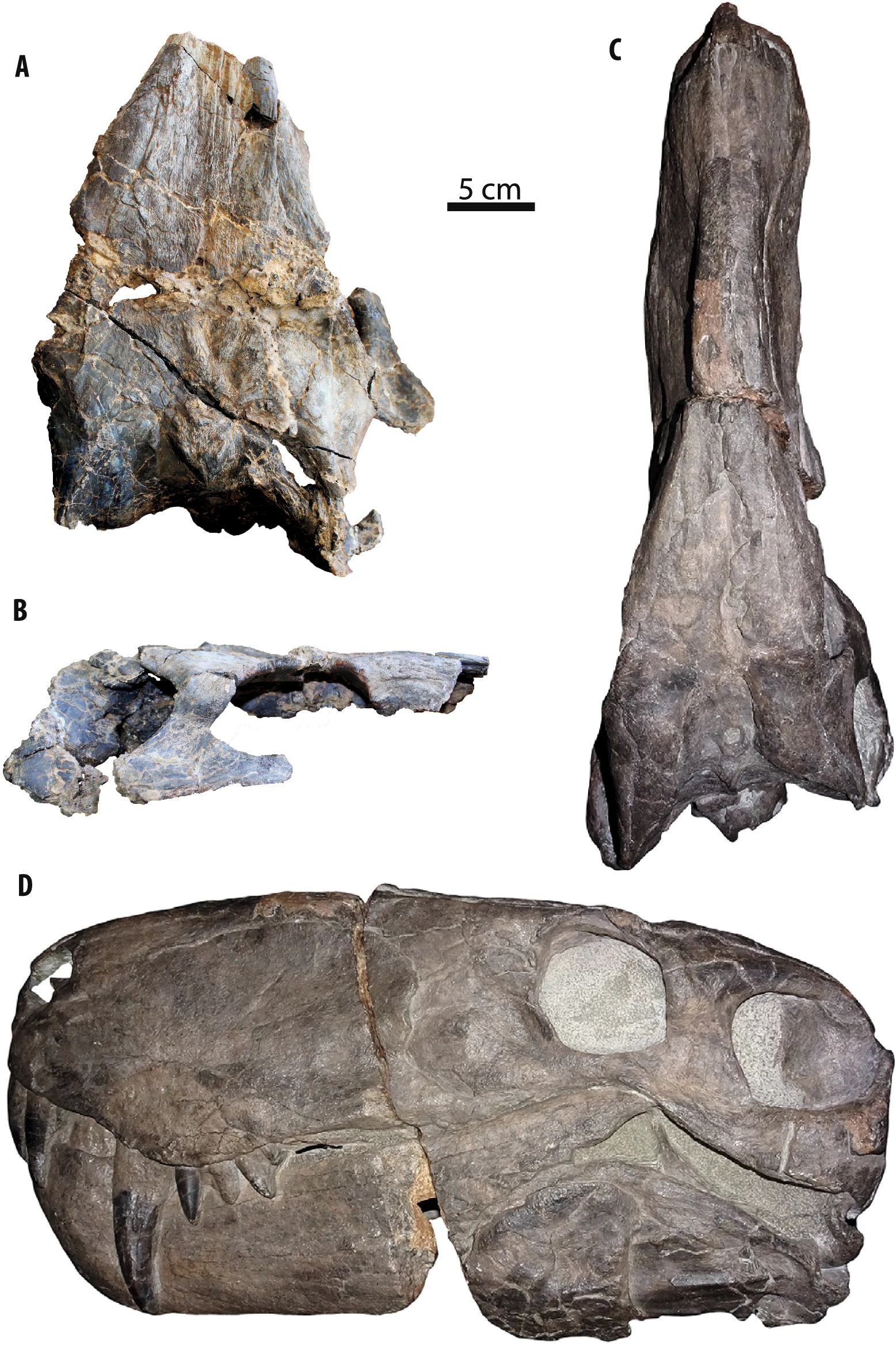
Skulls of I. africana, including PPM2018-7Z (A–B) and the holotype NMQR 4000 (C–D)

In 2010, the Bloemfontein Museum sent an expedition to the farm of Nooitgedacht 68, located near the town of Bethulie, in the Karoo Basin, South Africa. It was during this same expedition that Nthaopa Ntheri discovered a partial skeleton of a large gorgonopsian which include an almost complete skull, cataloged as NMQR 4000. During a second expedition launched the following year, John Nyaphuli discovers another partial skeleton similar to that of the previously discovered specimen, cataloged as NMQR 3707. The existence of these two specimens are mentioned in 2014 in the chapter of a work listing the discoveries made at this farm, but it was not until 2023 that American paleontologist Christian F. Kammerer and his colleagues made the first official description concerning these latter. Their descriptions unexpectedly confirm that these specimens belong to Inostrancevia, which is a significant first given that the genus was historically only reported in Russia. The specimens nevertheless possessed some differences allowing them to be distinguished from the Russian lineages, they were then classified in the newly erected species I. africana, the specimen NMQR 4000 being designated as the holotype of this species, while NMQR 3707 was bequeathed as a paratype. However, the article officially describing this animal focuses primarily on the stratigraphic significance of the findings and is only a brief introduction to the anatomy of the new fossil material, being the subject for future study.

In 2018, fieldwork in the Metangula graben, Mozambique, uncovered a partial skull of a large gorgonopsian now numbered as PPM2018-7Z. In a 2025 paper, this specimen was identified as I. africana based on diagnosis provided by Kammerer and colleagues two years earlier. Much earlier, in June 2007, a team of paleontologists discovered an isolated left premaxilla, cataloged as NMT RB380, in the Ruhuhu Basin, southern Tanzania. The fossil bone was subsequently scanned and identified as Inostrancevia sp. in a 2024 study led by American paleontologists Anna J. Brant and Christian A. Sidor. However, in their paper describing the skull discovered in Mozambique, Macungo and his colleagues reclassify the Tanzanian specimen as I. africana.

=== Synonyms and formerly assigned species ===
In his two works published in 1927, Pravoslavlev also named several additional gorgonopsian taxa. (Note: The existence of these taxa are already mentioned in the article describing I. alexandri, but were not officially named and described in detail until 1927.) In their broad revision of the classification of therapsids published in 1956, David Watson and Alfred Romer recognized without argumentation almost all of the taxa erected by Pravoslavlev as valid, but their opinions were never followed in subsequent works. In addition of I. latifrons, Pravoslavlev names and describes two additional species of the genus Inostrancevia: I. parva and I. proclivis. In 1940, the paleontologist Ivan Yefremov expressed doubts about this classification, and considered that the holotype specimen of I. parva should be viewed as a juvenile of the genus and not as a distinct species. It was in 1953 that Boris Pavlovich Vyuschkov completely revised the species named for Inostrancevia. For I. parva, he moves it to a new genus, which he names Pravoslavlevia, in honor of the original author who named the species. Although being a distinct and valid genus, Pravoslavlevia turns out to be a closely related taxon. Also in his article, he considers that I. proclivis is a junior synonym of I. alexandri, but remains open to the question of the existence of this species, arguing his opinion with the insufficient preservation of type specimens. This taxon will be definitively judged as being conspecific to I. alexandri in the revision of the genus carried out by Tatarinov in 1974.

In the first work published earlier the same year, Pravoslavlev erected another genus of gorgonopsians, Amalitzkia, with the type species A. annae. In his larger work published subsequently, he erected a second species under the name of A. wladimiri. The genus as well as the two species are named in honor of the couple of paleontologists who carried out the work on the first known specimens of I. alexandri. In 1953, Vjuschkov discovered that the genus Amalitzkia is a junior synonym of Inostrancevia, renaming A. wladimiri to I. wladimiri, before the latter was itself recognized as a junior synonym of I. latifrons by later publications. For some unclear reason, Vjuschkov refers A. annae as a nomen nudum, when his description is quite viable. Just like A. wladimiri, A. annae will be synonymized with I. latifrons by Tatarinov in 1974. Most of the Inostrancevia species named by Pravoslavlev correspond to specimens representing different growth stages within the genus, while those previously attributed to Amalitzkia may even represent old male individuals due to their more massive bones originating from a possible sexual dimorphism.

In 2003, Mikhail F. Ivakhnenko erected a new genus of Russian gorgonopsian under the name of Leogorgon klimovensis, on the basis of a partial braincase and a large referred canine, both discovered in the Klimovo-1 locality, in the Vologda Oblast. In his official description, Ivakhnenko classifies this taxon among the subfamily Rubidgeinae, whose fossils are exclusively known from what is now Africa. This would therefore make Leogorgon the first known representative of this group to have lived outside this continent. In 2008, however, Ivakhnenko noted that, due to its poorly known anatomy, Leogorgon could be a relative of the Russian Phthinosuchidae rather than the sole Russian representative of the Rubidgeinae. In 2016, Kammerer formally rejected Ivakhnenko's classifications, because the holotype braincase of Leogorgon likely came from a dicynodont, while the attributed canine tooth is indistinguishable from that of Inostrancevia. Since then, Leogorgon has been recognized as a nomen dubium of which part of the fossils possibly come from Inostrancevia. Other species belonging to distinct lineages were sometimes inadvertently classified in the genus Inostrancevia. For example, in 1940, Efremov classifies a gorgonopsian of then-problematic status as I. progressus. However, in 1955, Alexey Bystrow moved this species to the separate genus Sauroctonus. A large maxilla discovered in Vladimir Oblast in the 1950s was also assigned to Inostrancevia, but the fossil would be reassigned to a large therocephalian in 1997, and later designated as the holotype of the genus Megawhaitsia in 2008.

== Description ==
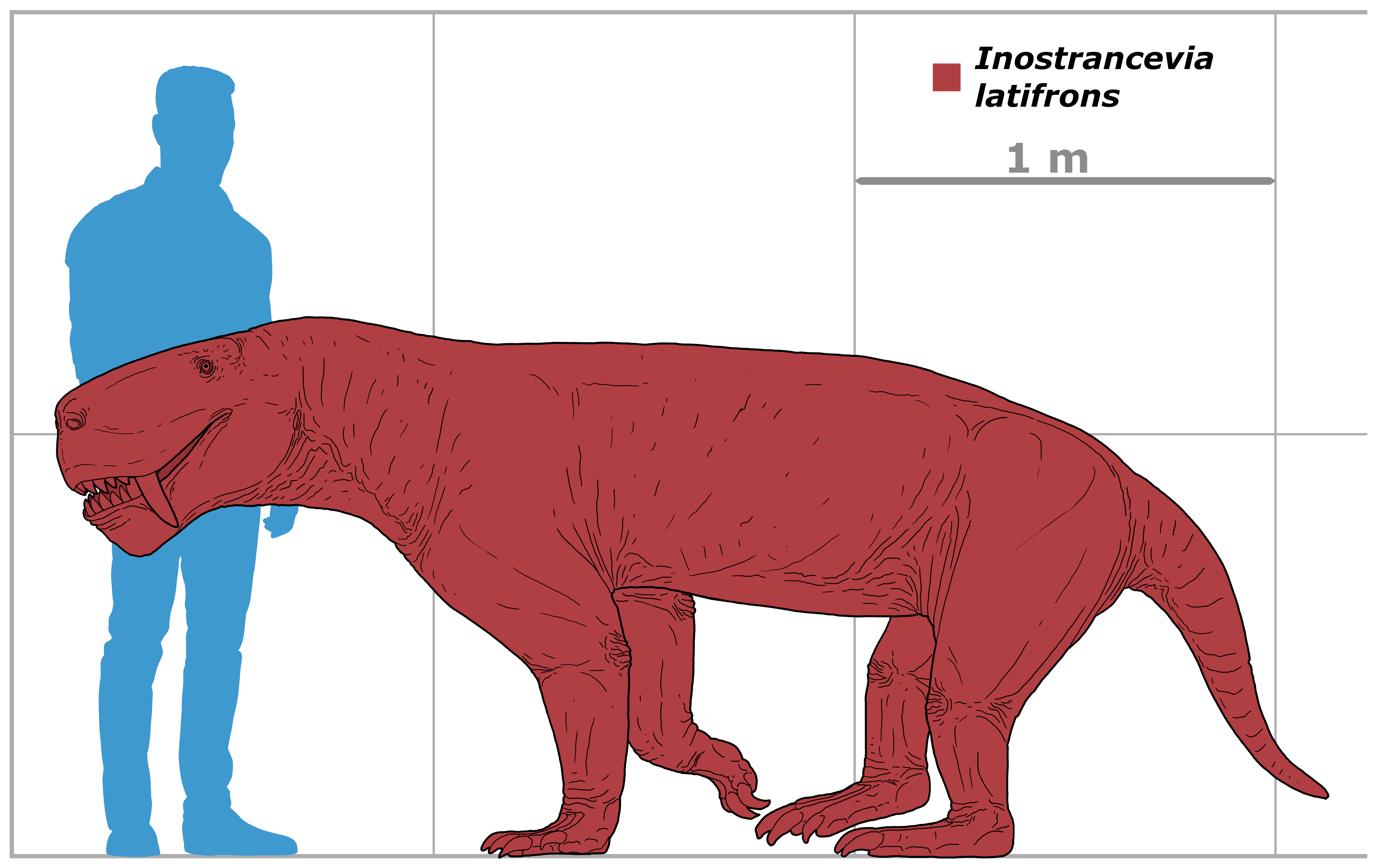
Scale chart, showing I. latifrons size compared to a human

Inostrancevia is a gorgonopsian with a fairly robust morphology, the Spanish paleoartist Mauricio Antón describing it as a "scaled-up version" of Lycaenops. The numerous descriptions given to this taxon make it one of the most emblematic animals of the Permian period, mainly because of its large size among gorgonopsians, rivaled only by the South African genus Rubidgea, the latter having a roughly similar size. Gorgonopsians were skeletally robust, yet long-limbed for therapsids, with a somewhat dog-like stance, though with outwards-turned elbows. It is unknown whether non-mammaliaform therapsids such as gorgonopsians were covered in hair or not.

The specimens PIN 2005/1578 and PIN 1758, belonging to I. alexandri, are among the largest and most complete gorgonopsian fossils identified to date. Both specimens are around 3 m (9.8 ft) long, with the skulls alone measuring over 50 cm (20 in). However, I. latifrons, although known from more fragmentary fossils, is estimated to have a more imposing size, the skull being 60 cm (24 in) long, indicating that it would have measured 3.5 m (11 ft) and weighed 300 kg (660 lb). The size of I. uralensis is unknown due to very incomplete fossils, but it appears to be smaller than I. latifrons. The two known South African specimens of I. africana are among the largest gorgonopsians to have been discovered in Africa, the holotype skull, NMWR 4000, measured 44.2 cm (17.4 in), while that of the paratype, NMQR 3707, reaches 48.1 cm (18.9 in). These proportions are matched only by the largest known specimens of Rubidgea. Based on comparisons with various other gorgonopsians, NMT RB380, the Tanzanian specimen of I. africana, would have had a skull with an estimated length of between 38.5 to 69 cm (15.2 to 27.2 in) long. However, the authors mention that it is difficult to know if the specimen would have been similar in size to those of recognized species. Kulik (2025), using humeral and femoral regressions, estimated that NMQR 4000 had a body mass of 208.5 kg (460 lb), ranging from 156.5–260.5 kg (345–574 lb).

=== Skull and teeth ===
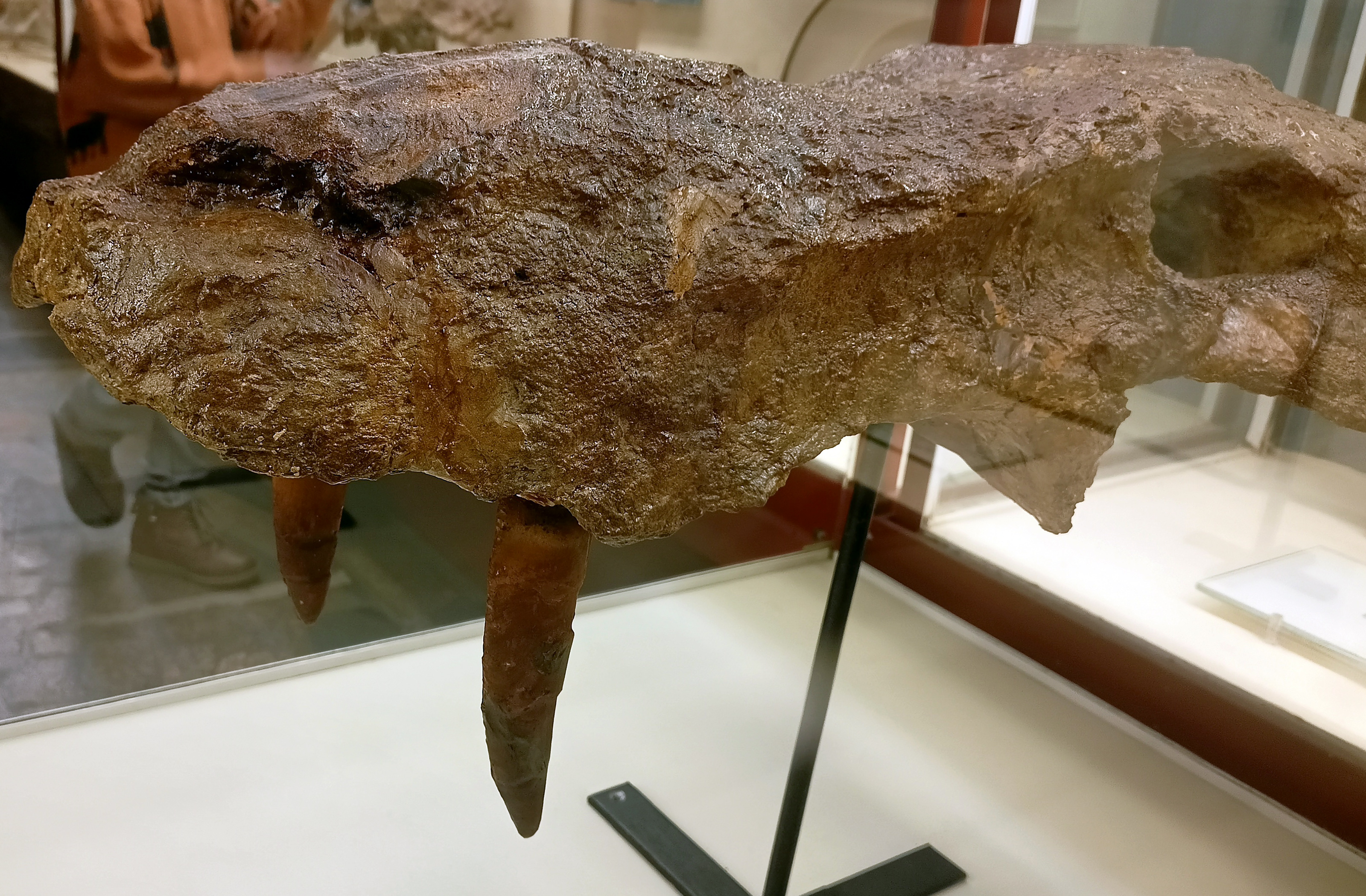
Referred skull of I. alexandri

The overall shape of the skull of Inostrancevia is similar to those of other gorgonopsians, i. e. long and narrow. It has a broad back skull, a raised and elongated snout, relatively small eye sockets and thin cranial arches. The pineal foramen is located near the posterior edge of the parietals and rests on a strong projection in the middle of an elongated hollow like impression. The sagittal suture is reinforced with complex curvatures. The ventral surface of the palatine bones is completely smooth, lacking traces of palatine teeth or tubercles. Just like Viatkogorgon, the top margin of the quadrate is thickened. The dentary bone appear to have a clearly visible chin-like structure. The four recognized species are distinguished by their own specific characteristics. I. alexandri is distinguished by its relatively narrow occiput, a broad and rounded oval temporal fenestra and the transverse flangues of the pterygoid with teeth. I. latifrons is distinguished by a comparatively lower and broader snout, larger parietal region, fewer teeth and a less developed palatal tuberosities. I. uralensis is characterized by a transversely elongated oval slot-like temporal fenestra. I. africana is characterized by the strong constriction of the jugal under the orbit, a proportionally longer snout, the pineal foramen located in a deep parietal depression, as well as a much more raised and massive dentary bone.

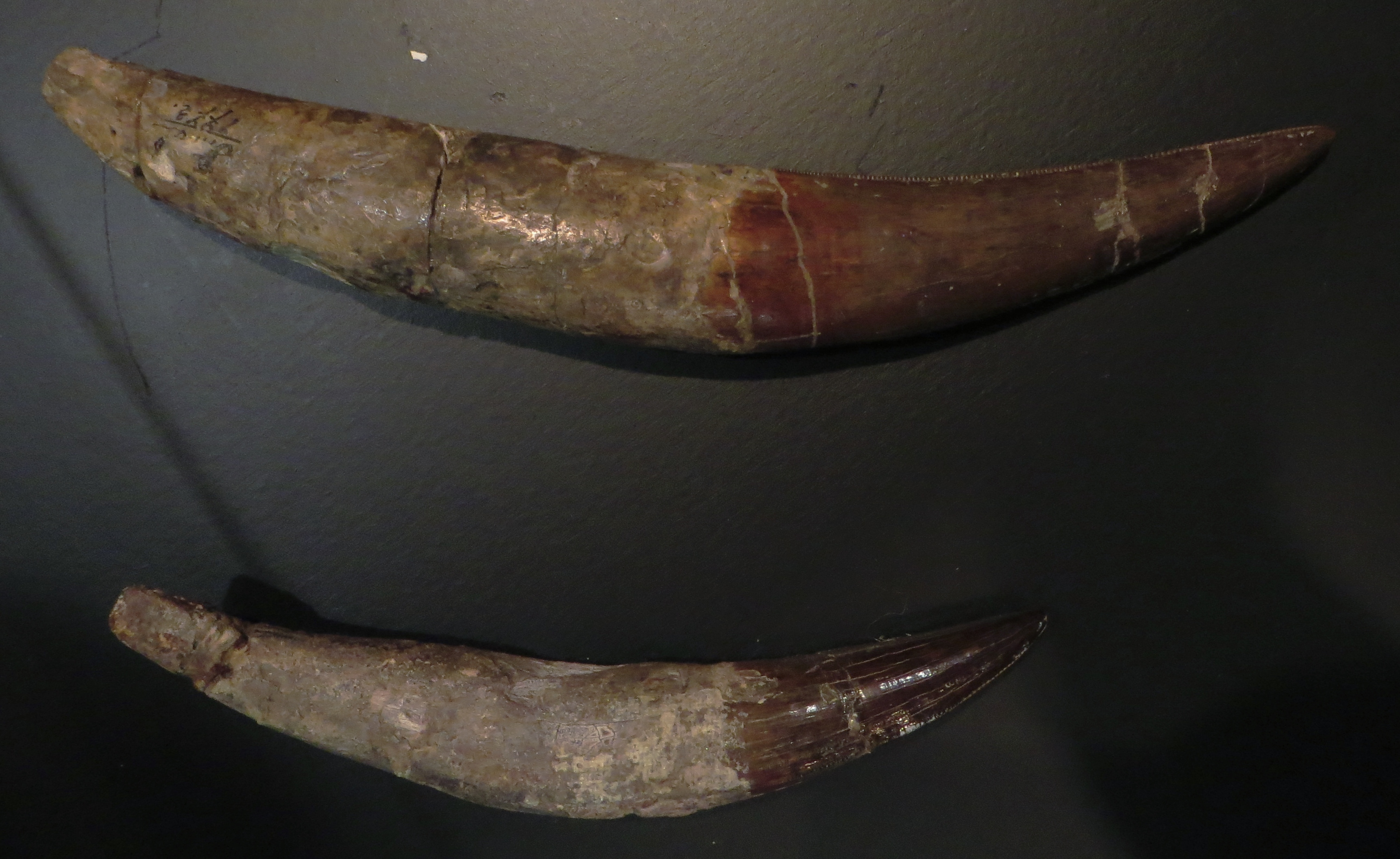
Canine tooth of I. alexandri (top) and Leogorgon klimovensis (bottom)

The jaws of Inostrancevia are powerfully developed, equipped with teeth able to hold and tear the skin of prey. The teeth are also devoid of cusps and can be distinguished into three types: the incisors, the canines and the postcanines. (Note: Previously identified as molars by Amalitsky, this type of teeth was later redescribed as postcanine teeth, having a lack of functional range.) All teeth are more or less laterally compressed and have finely serrated front and rear edges. When the mouth is closed, the upper canines move into position at the sides of the mandible, reaching its lower edge. The canines of Inostrancevia measuring between 12 cm (4.7 in) and 15 cm (5.9 in), they are among the largest identified among non-mammalian therapsids, only the anomodont Tiarajudens have similarly sized canines. In his 1927 description, Pravoslavlev describes the teeth of Inostrancevia as reminding him of those of the saber-toothed cat Machairodus. In the upper and lower jaws, these canines are roughly equal in size and are slightly curved. The incisors turn out to be very robust. A unique trait among gorgonopsians, Inostrancevia only has four incisors on the premaxilla, unlike other representatives of the group who generally have five. The postcanine teeth are present on the upper jaw, on its slightly upturned alveolar edges. In contrast, they are completely absent from the lower jaw. There are indications that the tooth replacement would have taken place by the young teeth, growing at the root of the old ones and gradually supplanting them. The capsule of the canines is very large, containing up to three capsules of replacement canines at different stages of development.

=== Postcranial skeleton ===
Although the postcranial anatomy of Inostrancevia was first described in detail in 1927 by Pravoslavlev, new discoveries and anatomical descriptions of this taxon have led authors suggesting further revisions to broaden the skeletal understanding of the animal. The skeleton of Inostrancevia is of very robust constitution, mainly at the level of the limbs. The ungual phalanges have an acute triangular shape. Inostrancevia has the most autapomorphic postcranial skeleton identified on a gorgonopsian. The scapula of this latter is unmistakable, with an enlarged plate-like blade unlike that of any other known gorgonopsians, but its anatomy is also unusual, with ridges and thickened tibiae, especially at their joint margins. The scapular blade of Inostrancevia being extremely enlarged, its morphology will most likely be subject to future study regarding its paleobiological function.

== Classification and evolution ==
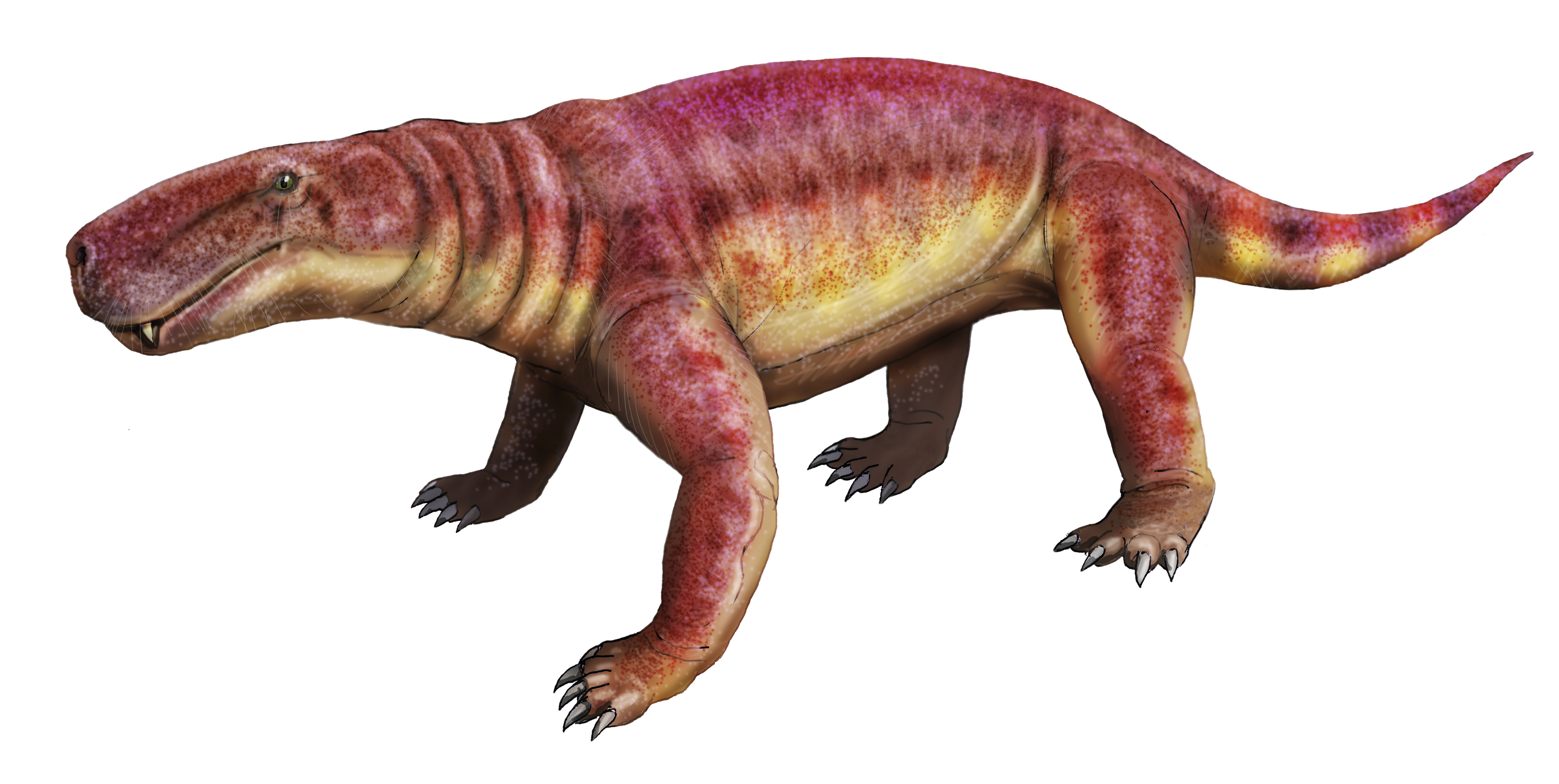
Restoration of I. africana

From its original description published in 1922, Inostrancevia was immediately classified in the family Gorgonopsidae after anatomical comparisons made with the type genus Gorgonops. This classification was maintained as such until 1948, when von Huene established a separate family of gorgonopsians, Inostranceviidae, to include Inostrancevia. Huene's opinion was generally shared in various studies published subsequently during the 20th century and even into the 21st century, although with some alternative classifications. In 1974, Tatarinov classified Pravoslavlevia as a sister taxon of Inostrancevia within this family. In 1989, Denise Sigogneau-Russell proposes a similar classification, but moves the taxon reuniting the two genera as a subfamily, being renamed Inostranceviinae, and is classified in the more general family Gorgonopsidae. In 2002, in his revision of the Russian gorgonopsians, Mikhail F. Ivakhnenko re-erects the family Inostranceviidae and classifies the taxon as one of the lineages of the superfamily "Rubidgeoidea", placed alongside the Rubidgeidae and Phtinosuchidae. One year later, in 2003, he reclassifies Inostrancevia in the family Inostranceviidae, similar to Tatarinov's proposal, but the latter classifies it alone, making it a monotypic taxon.

In a 2007 unpublished thesis, German paleontologist Eva V. I. Gebauer carried out the very first phylogenetic analysis of gorgonopsians. Based on observations made on the occipital bones and canines, Gebauer moved Inostrancevia as a sister taxon to the Rubidgeinae, a lineage consisting of robust African gorgonopsians. In 2016 Christian F. Kammerer regarded Gebauer's analysis as "unsatisfactory", citing that many of the characters used by her analysis were based upon skull proportions that are variable within taxa, both individually and ontogenetically (i.e. traits that change through growth). In 2018, in their description of Nochnitsa and re-description of the skull of Viatkogorgon, Kammerer and Vladimir Masyutin propose that all Russian and African taxa should be separately grouped into two distinct clades. For Russian genera (except basal taxa), this relationship is supported by notable cranial traits, such as the close contact between the pterygoid and the vomer. The classification proposed by Kammerer and Masyutin will serve as the basis for all other subsequent phylogenetic studies of gorgonopsians. Using this model, the 2023 study by Kammerer and colleagues describing I. africana recovers it as a sister taxon to I. alexandri within the Russian origin clade. As with previous classifications, Pravoslavlevia is still recovered as the sister taxon of Inostrancevia. The following cladogram shows the position of Inostrancevia within the Gorgonopsia after Macungo et al. (2026):

- Gorgonopsia
  - Nochnitsa
  - - Viatkogorgon
    - - "Russian clade"
        - Suchogorgon
        - - Sauroctonus
          - - Pravoslavlevia
            - Inostrancevia
      - "African clade"
        - - Eriphostoma
          - - Gorgonops
            - - Jirahgorgon
              - Phorcys
        - - Cynariops
          - - Lycaenops
            - - - Arctops
                - - DA21/17-01-01
                    (Port des Canonge Fm. gorgonopsian)
                  - Smilesaurus
              - - Arctognathus
                - Rubidgeinae

Gorgonopsians are a major group of carnivorous therapsids, the oldest known definitive specimen coming from the Mediterranean island of Mallorca, and which probably dates to the early Middle Permian, or even earlier. During the Middle Permian, the majority of representatives of this clade were quite small and their ecosystems were mainly dominated by dinocephalians, large therapsids characterized by strong bone robustness. However, some genera, notably Phorcys, are relatively larger in size and already occupy the role of superpredator in one of the oldest geological strata of the Karoo Supergroup. Gorgonopsians were the first group of predatory animals to develop saber teeth, long before true mammals and dinosaurs evolved. This feature later evolved independently multiple times in different predatory mammal groups, such as felids and thylacosmilids. Geographically, gorgonopsians are mainly distributed in the present territories of Africa and European Russia, with, however, an indeterminate specimen having been identified in the Turpan Depression, in north-west China, as well as a possible fragmentary specimen discovered in the Kundaram Formation, located in central India. After the Capitanian extinction, gorgonopsians began to occupy ecological niches abandoned by dinocephalians and large therocephalians, and adopted an increasingly imposing size, which very quickly gave them the role of superpredators. In Africa, it is mainly the rubidgeines who occupy this role, while in Russia, only Inostrancevia acquires as such.

== Paleobiology ==
=== Hunting strategy ===
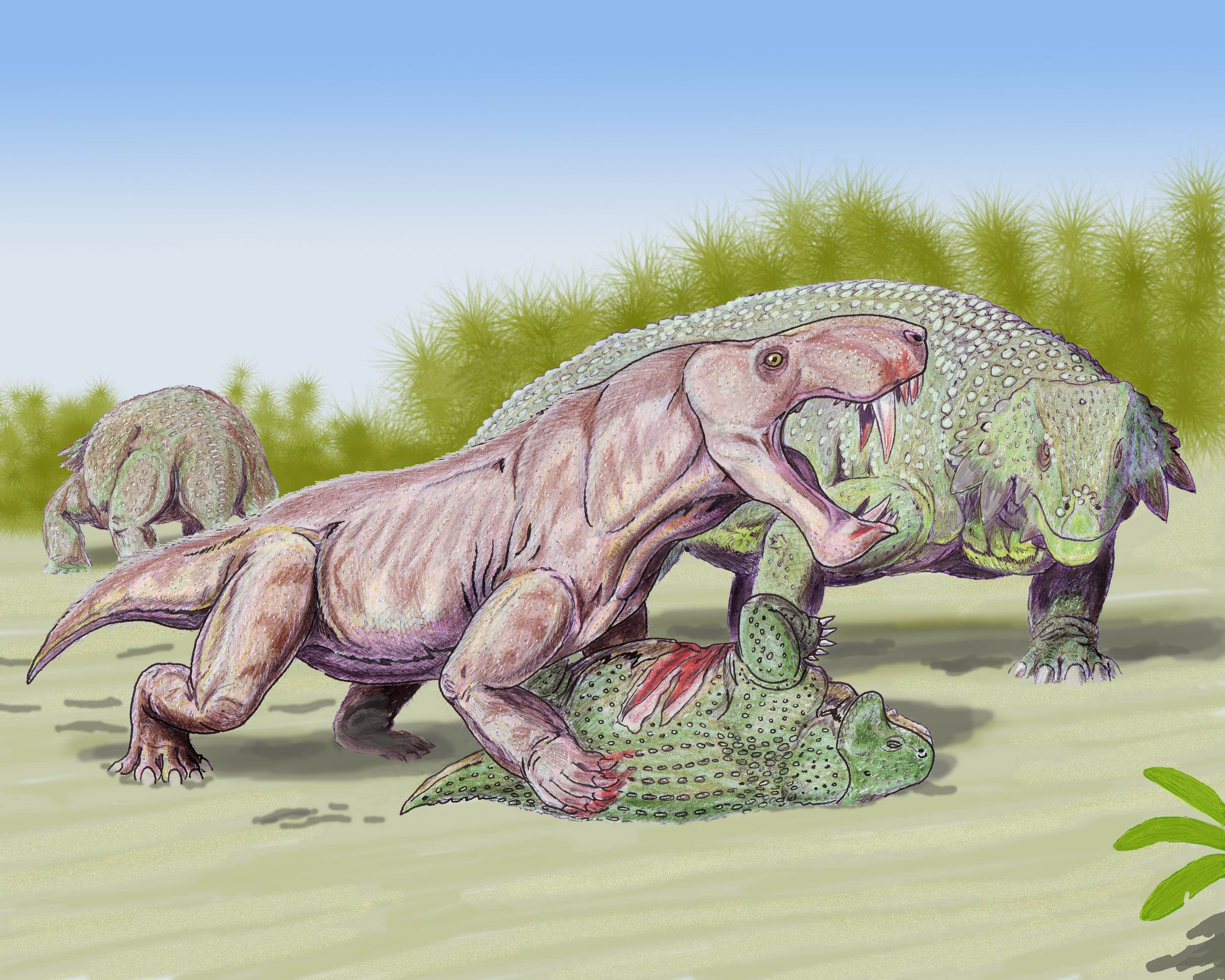
Restoration of an I. alexandri attacking a juvenile Scutosaurus

One of the most recognizable characteristics of Inostrancevia (and other gorgonopsians, as well) is the presence of long, saber-like canines on the upper and lower jaws. How these animals would have used this dentition is debated. The bite force of saber-toothed predators (like Inostrancevia), using three-dimensional analysis, was determined by Swiss paleontologist Stephan Lautenschlager and colleagues in 2020. Their findings detailed that, despite morphological convergence among saber-toothed predators, there is a range of methods of possible killing techniques. Model size suggests I. alexandri was capable of producing a bite force of 540 newtons; although lacking the necessary jaw strength to crush bone, the analysis found that even the most massive gorgonopsians possessed a more powerful bite than other saber-toothed predators. The study also indicated that the jaw of Inostrancevia was capable of a massive gape, perhaps enabling it to deliver a lethal bite, and in a fashion similar to the hypothesised killing technique of Smilodon (or 'saber-toothed cat'). They also noted due to their effective jaw gape being below 60 degrees suggests their jaws were better built for inflicting damages on smaller or similar sized prey.

Antón provided an overview of gorgonopsian biology in his 2013 book, writing that despite their differences from saber-toothed mammals, many features of their skeletons indicated they were not sluggish reptiles but active predators. While their brains were relatively smaller than those of mammals, and their sideways placed eyes provided limited stereoscopic vision, they had well-developed turbinals in their nasal cavity, a feature associated with an advanced sense of smell, which would have helped them track prey and carrion. The canine saber teeth were used for delivering the slashing killing-bite, while the incisors, which formed an arch in front of the saber teeth, held the prey and cut the flesh while feeding. To allow them to increase their gape when biting, gorgonopsians had several bones in their mandibles that could move in relation to each other and had a double articulation with the skull—unlike in mammals where the rear joint articular bone has become the malleus ear bone. Antón envisioned gorgonopsians would hunt by leaving their cover when prey was close enough, and use their relatively greater speed to pounce quickly on it, grab it with their forelimbs, and bite any part of the body that would fit in their jaws. Such a bite would cause a large loss of blood, but the predator would continue to try to bite vulnerable parts of the body.

=== Motion ===
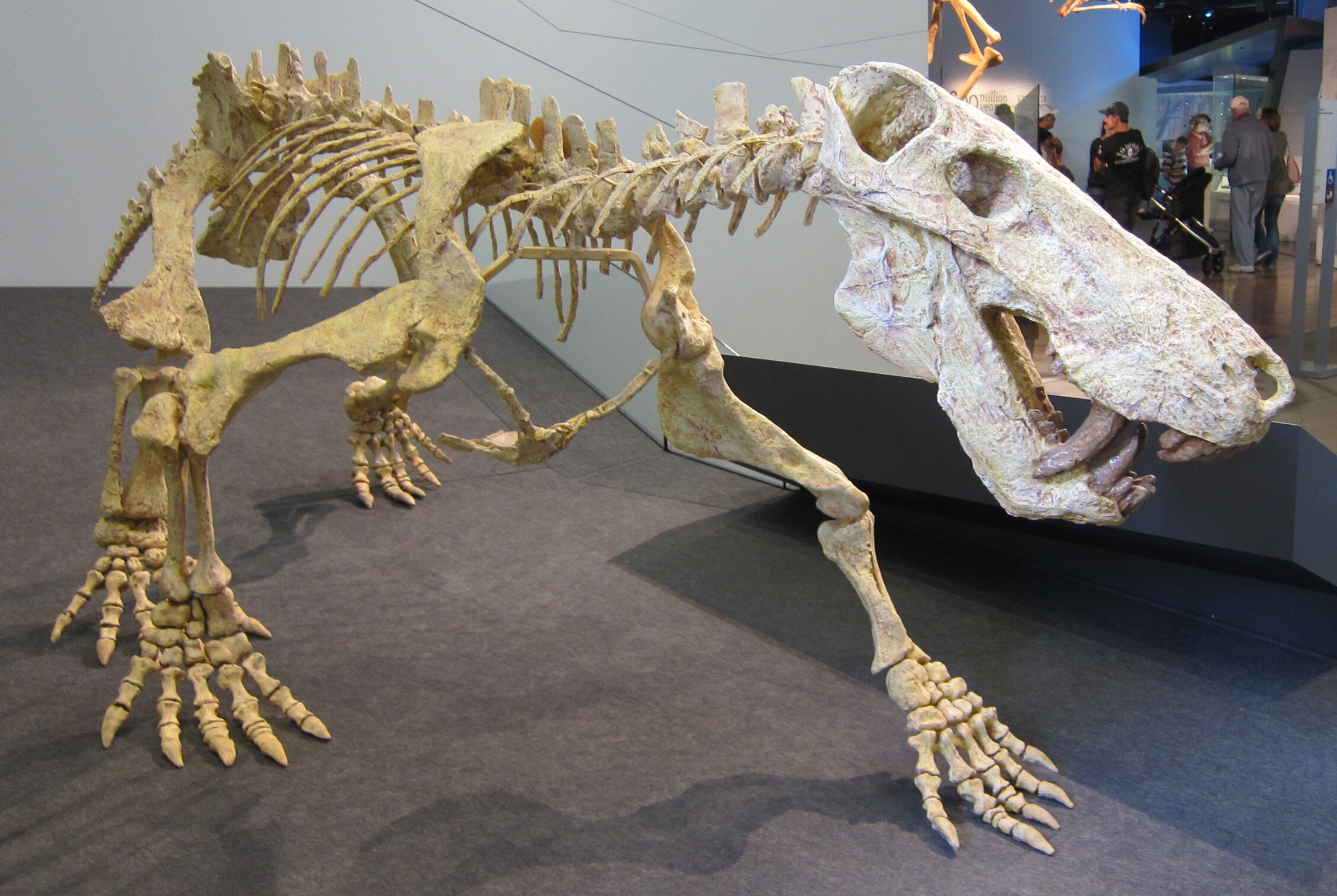
Skeleton mounted with sprawling limbs; gorgonopsians are now thought have had a more upright stance

Antón stated in 2013 that while the post-cranial skeletons of gorgonopsians were basically reptilian, their stance was far more upright than in more primitive synapsids, like pelycosaurs, which were more sprawling. Regular locomotion of gorgonopsians would have been similar to the "high walks" seen in crocodilians, wherein the belly is carried above the ground, with the feet pointing forwards, and the limbs carried under the trunk instead of to the sides. The forelimbs had a more horizontal posture than the hindlimbs, with the elbows pointing outwards during movement, but the gait of the hindlimbs would have resembled that of mammals. As in reptiles, the tail muscles (such as the caudofemoralis) were important in flexion of the hindlimb, whereas the tails of mammals are merely for balance. Their feet were probably plantigrade (where the soles were placed flat on the ground), though they were likely more swift and agile than their prey. Their feet were more symmetrical compared to the reptilian condition, making contact with the ground more efficient, similar to running mammals.

=== Histology ===
Osteohistological analysis found NMQR 4000, the holotype of I. africana, found the bone tissues consisted of a highly vascularized WPC with various vascular canal orientations. The presence of high vascularization and lack of slower-forming bone tissues suggests the specimen wasn't a reproductive mature individual and would have grown significantly if it reached adulthood.

== Palaeoecology ==
=== Paleoenvironment ===
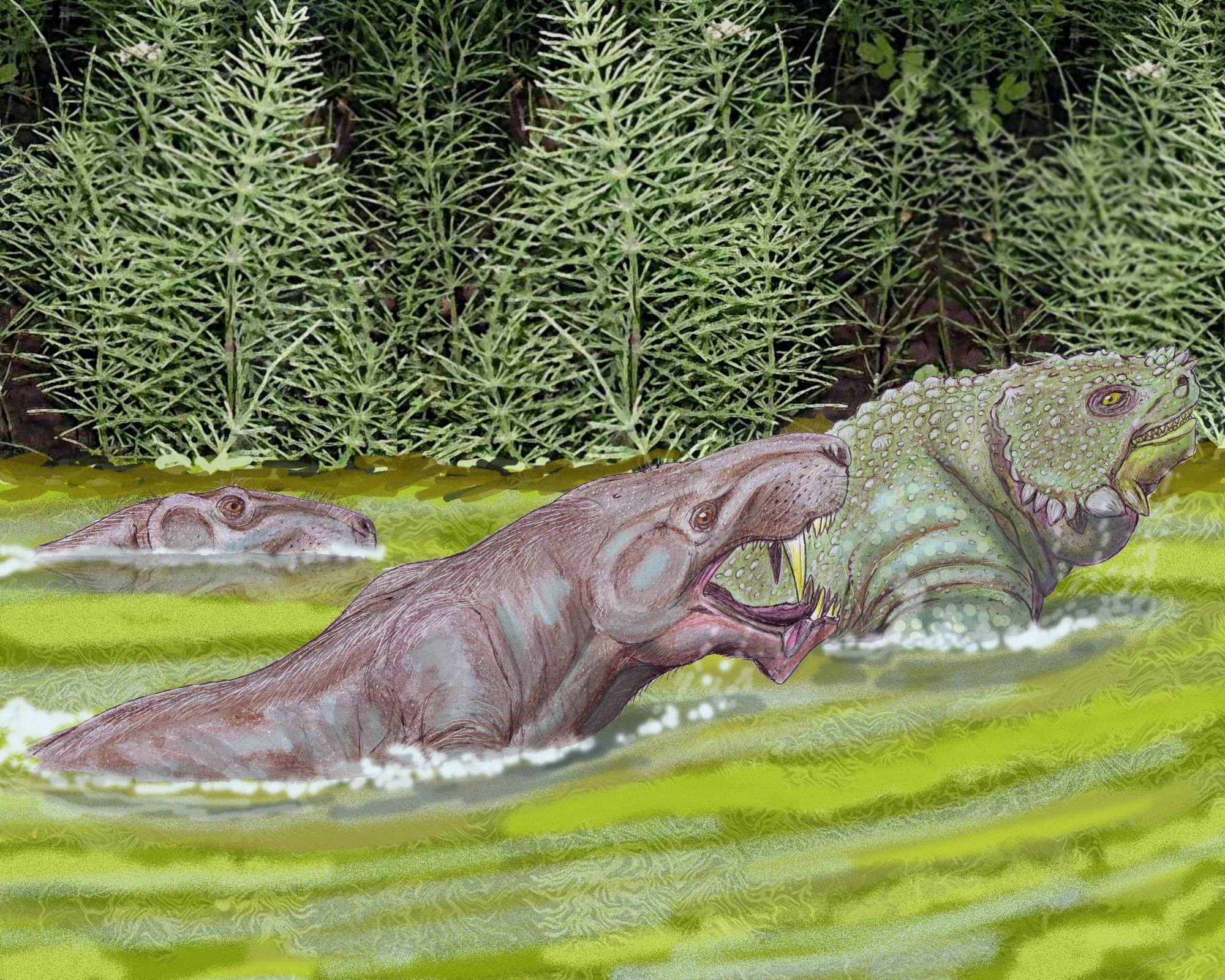
Restoration of two I. latifrons chasing a Scutosaurus

Inostrancevia is currently the only formally recognized gorgonopsian genus that had a transcontinental distribution, being present in both territories from which the group's fossils are unanimously recorded, namely in Southern Africa and European Russia. In all the geological formations concerned, Inostrancevia would have been one if not the main apex predator of these faunas, targeting a large majority of the tetrapods living alongside it, and more probably towards dicynodonts and pareiasaurs. During the Late Permian when Inostrancevia lived, the Southern Urals (close in proximity to the Sokolki assemblage) were located around latitude 28–34°N and defined as a "cold desert" dominated by fluvial deposits. The Salarevo Formation in particular (a horizon where the Russian species Inostrancevia hails from) was deposited in a seasonal, semi-arid-to-arid area with multiple shallow water lakes which was periodically flooded. The Paleoflora of much of European Russia at the time was dominated by a genus of peltaspermaceaen, Tatarina, and other related genera, followed by ginkgophytes and conifers. On the other hand, ferns were relatively rare and sphenophytes were only locally present. There are also hygrophyte and halophyte plants in coastal areas as well as conifers that are more resistant to drought and higher altitudes. The Upper Daptocephalus Assemblage Zone in South Africa would have been a well-drained floodplain. The Usili Formation in Tanzania corresponds to an alluvial plain which would have had numerous small meandering streams passing through well-vegetated floodplains. The basement of this formation would also have housed a generally high phreatic zone.

=== Contemporary fauna ===
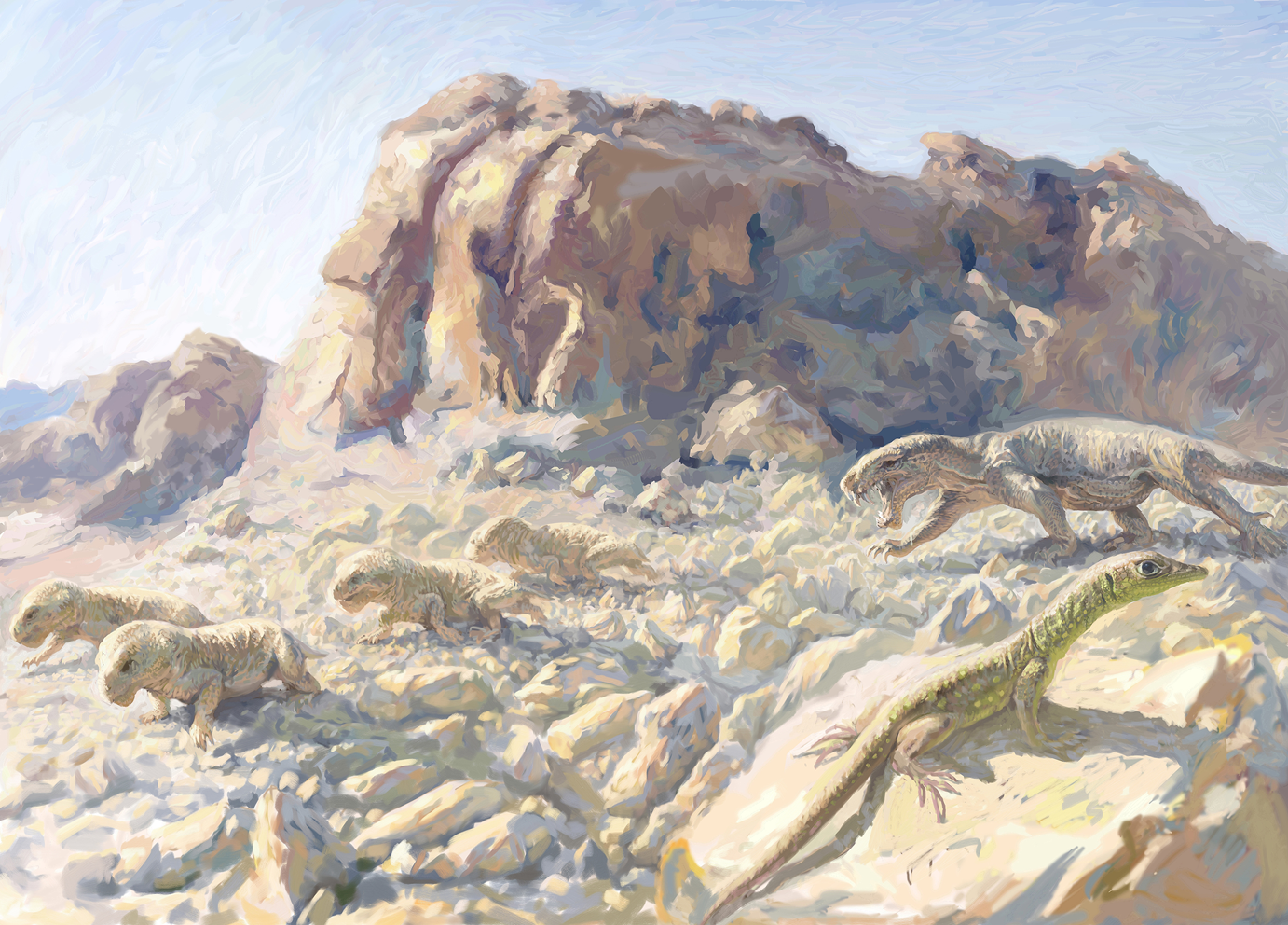
Life restoration of a gorgonopsian hunting a herd of dicynodonts, based after the Usili Formation

In the Russian fossil record, Inostrancevia is currently the only large gorgonopsian to have been documented, with Pravoslavlevia being a smaller representative. In Tanzania, however, the taxon was coeval with a considerable number of other gorgonopsians, including even the large rubidgeines Dinogorgon and Rubidgea. In South Africa, Inostrancevia would probably have occupied the place of the main apex predator after the extinction of the rubidgeines. However, it is possible that I. africana would not have been the only gorgonopsian to have been discovered on the Nooitgedacht 68 farm, because an indeterminate specimen belonging to this group is also listed there. The known specimen from Mozambique would also have been contemporary with an undetermined gorgonopsian similar in size to Aelurognathus. In southern Africa, dicynodonts are the most abundant fossil tetrapods, while in the Russian archives only Vivaxosaurus is known. Apart from gorgonopsians, the genus was also contemporaneous with other theriodonts, such as therocephalians (mainly akidnognathids) and numerous basal cynodonts such as Dvinia and Procynosuchus. Exclusively in the Usili Formation, Inostrancevia would have been contemporary with biarmosuchians of the genera Burnetia and Pembacephalus. A number of other non-synapsid tetrapods were contemporaneous with Inostrancevia. Among sauropsids, pareiasaurs, notably Scutosaurus, are the tetrapods most present in the Russian fossil record, although other representatives such as Anthodon and Pareiasaurus are known in African formations. Contemporary archosauromorphs such as Aenigmastropheus and Proterosuchus have only been identified in Africa, respectively in Tanzania and South Africa. Contemporary temnospondyls include Dvinosaurus in Russia and Peltobatrachus in Tanzania. Reptiliomorphs like Chroniosuchus and Kotlassia have been identified in Russia.

== Extinction ==
The transition from the Sokolki to Vyanzniki assemblage saw notable changes within the terrestrial fauna, such as the extinction of the Russian gorgonopsians. The cause of the extinction of the Russian gorgonopsians was due to their inability to adapt to the changing temperature and humidity. Following their local extinction, Russian gorgonopsians were replaced by large therocephalians and archosauriforms. The last gorgonopsians, Cyonosaurus and I. africana, went extinct during the Permian–Triassic extinction event. The cause of the PTME was thought to have been the result of volcanism from the Siberian Traps. Volcanism from the Siberian traps caused a massive spike in greenhouse gases that caused rapid aridification due to: temperature spike (as much as 8–10 °C at the equator, with average equatorial temperatures of 32–35 °C, or 90–95 °F, at the beginning of the Triassic), acid rain(with pH as low as 2 or 3 during eruption and 4 globally, and the subsequent dearth of forests for the first 10 million years of the Triassic), frequent wildfires (though they were already rather common throughout the Permian), and potential breakdown of the ozone layer (possibly briefly increasing UV radiation bombardment by 400% at the equator and 5000% at the poles). The increased temperature resulted in stronger El Nino events, which heightened short-term climate variability.

Ostehistological analysis on gorgonopsians found they reached reproductive maturity later than Early Triassic therapsids, making them more vulnerable to the environmental changes during the PTME. Following the extinction of I. africana, Moschorhinus would fill in the niche as the largest predator within the Karoo Basin, prior to the appearance of proterosuchid archosauriforms.

== See also ==
- Sauroctonus
- Suchogorgon
- Pravoslavlevia
