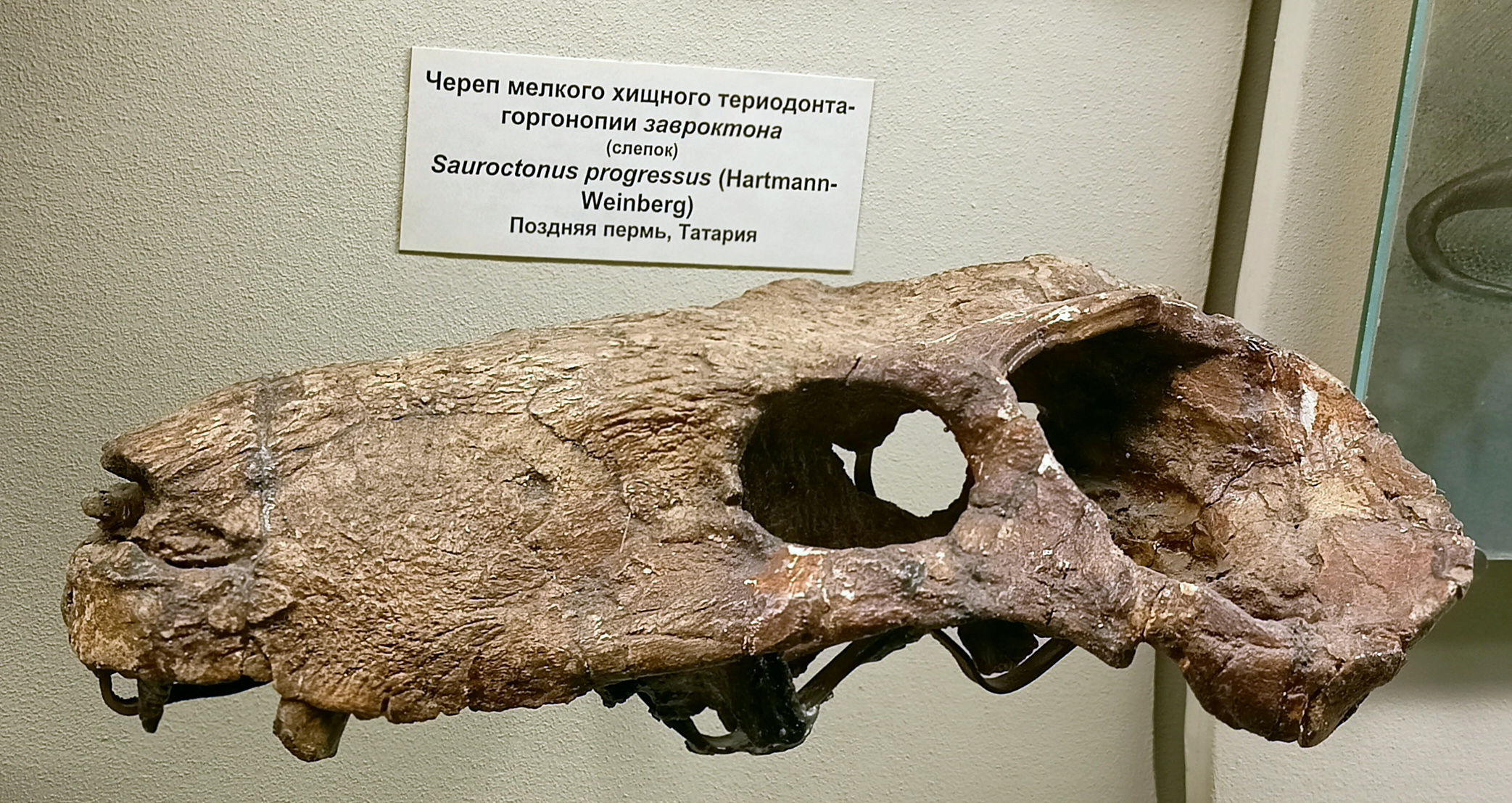
- Overview of PIN 156/5, the lectotype skull of S. progressus

Scientific classification
- Kingdom: Animalia
- Phylum: Chordata
- Clade: Synapsida
- Clade: Therapsida
- Clade: †Gorgonopsia
- Genus: †Sauroctonus; Bystrow, 1955

Type species
- †Arctognathus progressus Hartmann-Weinberg, 1938

Other species
- Sauroctonus? parringtoni (von Huene, 1950)

Synonyms
- Synonyms of S. progressus: Arctognathus progressus Hartmann-Weinberg, 1938; Inostrancevia progressus Yefremov, 1940; Synonyms of S?. parringtoni: Scymnognathus parringtoni von Huene, 1950; Aelurognathus parringtoni Sigogneau-Russell, 1970

= Sauroctonus =

Sauroctonus Temporal range: Late Permian (Wuchiapingian) 258–256.8 Ma

Extinct genus of therapsids

Sauroctonus ("lizard killer") is an extinct genus of gorgonopsian therapsids who lived during the end of the Late Permian in what is now European Russia. The first fossils, discovered in Tatarstan, were initially believed to belong to a new species of the South African genus Arctognathus (named A. progressus in 1938). The taxon was designated as such until 1940, when it was assigned to the genus Inostrancevia by Ivan Yefremov, before being definitively classified in a separate genus erected by Alexey Bystrow (in 1955). The most complete, known fossils of S. progressus include cranial and postcranial elements, currently all recorded from Tatarstan. These elements show that the animal was a mid-sized gorgonopsian.

Nearly complete remains listed from Tanzania have been attributed to a second species, S. parringtoni, which would make this genus the only known gorgonopsian to have lived in both Africa and Russia. However, it has been proven that this assimilation is mistaken, as it is mainly based on superficial resemblances, leaving the latter awaiting a more in-depth study to determine its relationships with other representatives of the group. Moreover, studies published post-2018 prove that S. progressus belongs to a grouping of Russian gorgonopsians, placed alongside the genera Suchogorgon, Pravoslavlevia and Inostrancevia, due to some shared cranial characteristics.

== Research history ==
=== S. progressus ===
In 1938, the Soviet paleontologist Alexandra Paulinovna Hartmann-Weinberg described some fossil remains of gorgonopsians having been discovered in Tatarstan, in the present-day Russia. One of the fossils described in her paper is an incomplete but well-preserved skull, cataloged PIN 156/5. Hartmann-Weinberg considers this specimen to belong to a new species of the South African genus Arctognathus, designating it as Arctognathus progressus. The specific epithet progressus is incorrectly named due to its supposed morphological closeness to cynodonts, sharing with them a larger number of progressive and more mammal-like features than other gorgonopsians. It quickly became apparent that the species is no more related to the cynodonts than other gorgonopsians, and in 1940, only two years after the publication of her article, one of Hartmann-Weinberg's employees, the reputed Ivan Yefremov reclassified the taxon as a new species of the Russian genus Inostrancevia, renaming it as Inostrancevia progressus. In 1955, after the analysis of the material, Alexey Bystrow proposed a separate genus for the species, which he named Sauroctonus, and designates the specimen PIN 156/5 as the lectotype of the taxon a proposal that will be quickly recognized later. The genus name Sauroctonus comes from the Ancient Greek σαῦρος (saûros, "lizard") and κτόνος / (któnos, "murderer" or "killer"), to literally give "lizard killer", in reference to its carnivorous diet. All known specimens are from the type locality where the first known skull was discovered. Among these fossils remains figures PIN 156/6, a specimen containing a crushed skull, some anterior part of the postcranial skeleton and numerous isolated bones.

=== S.? parringtoni ===
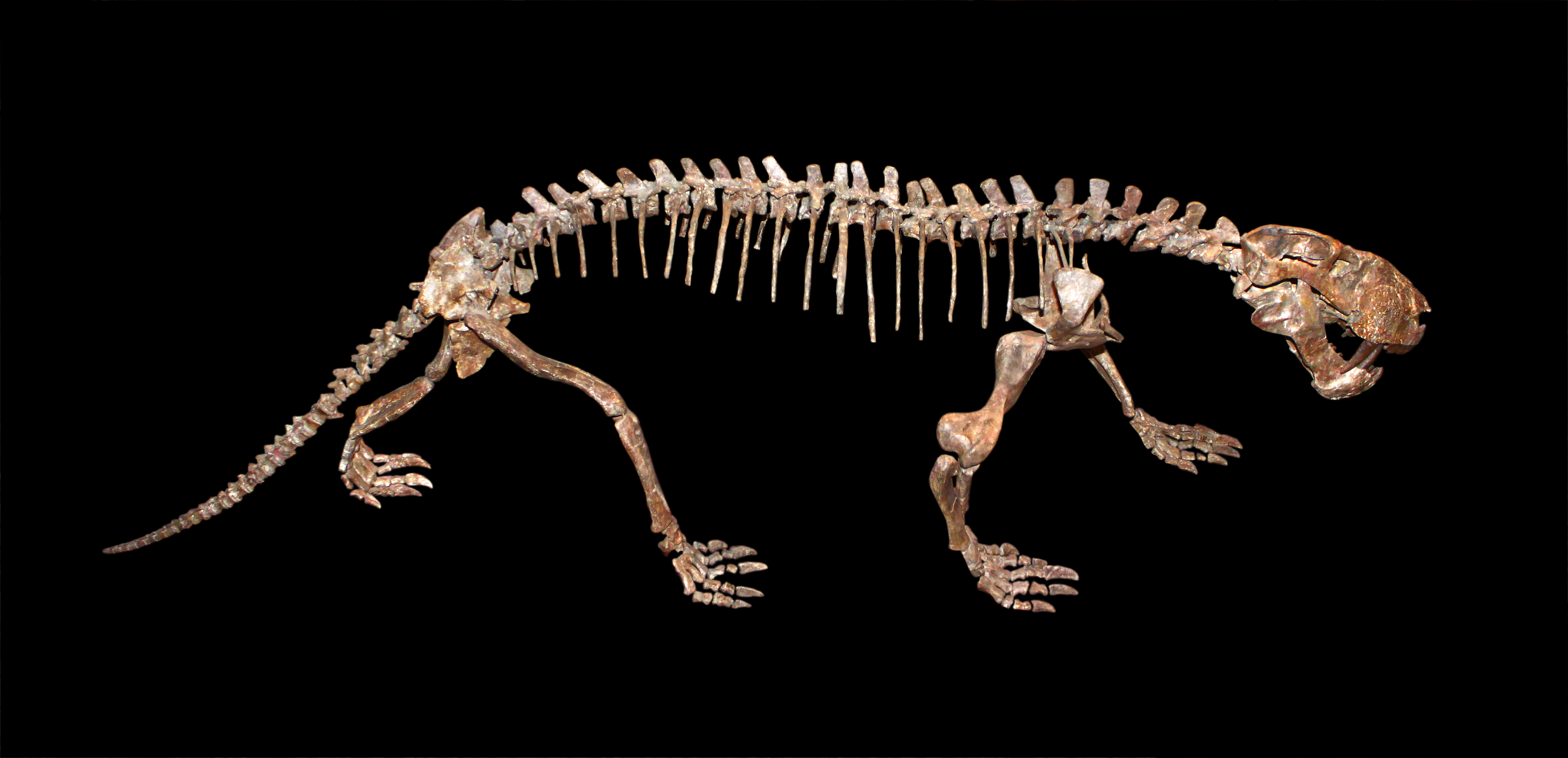
The specimen GPIT/RE/7113, previously assigned to a second species of the genus Sauroctonus

All confirmed remains of Sauroctonus are only recorded in Russian territory and belong to the species S. progressus, mainly represented by cranial material. In 1950, a relatively complete skeleton, discovered in the Usili Formation in Tanzania, cataloged GPIT/RE/7113, was described by the German paleontologist Friedrich von Huene as a representative of the species Scymnognathus parringtoni, (Note: Scymnognathus is now considered as a junior synonym of Gorgonops.) being named in honor of Francis Rex Parrington. In 1970, the skeleton was reidentified by the French paleontologist Denise Sigogneau-Russell as a specimen of Aelurognathus, being renamed Aelurognathus parringtoni. It is from 2007 that the paleontologist Eva V. I. Gebauer reclassifies it as an African representative of the genus Sauroctonus, a claim that she would confirm again in 2014. However, this affiliation is formally rejected in 2018, as new classifications based on cranial anatomical traits show that derived gorgonopsians are separated into two clade of Russian and African origin, leaving GPIT/RE/7113 as an incertae sedis within the latter group.

Other specimens have been attributed to this species, but no concrete affiliation has been worked out to date. For example, the well-preserved skull cataloged SAM-PK-K10034, mentioned briefly in a study concerning the nocturnal vision of non-mammalian synapsids, is referred to as S. cf. parringtoni.

== Description ==
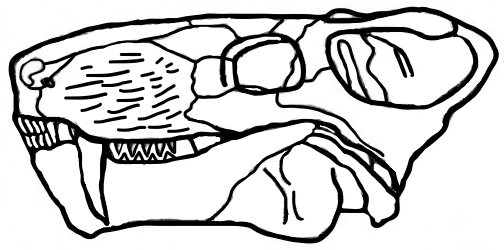
Diagram reconstructing PIN 156/5, the lectotype skull of S. progressus

The skull size of Sauroctonus is 22.5 cm long, indicating that it should be a medium-sized gorgonopsian. The skull is narrow posteriorly with small orbits. The temporal fossa is elongated, the cranial arches are narrow, and the dentary bone is moderately high. As in Viatkogorgon, Sauroctonus also has high palatal tuberosities that have many teeth, the bones poorly sculpted, and incisors only slightly larger than the postcanine teeth. There are also 4 to 6 postcanine teeth on the maxillary bones.

== Classification ==
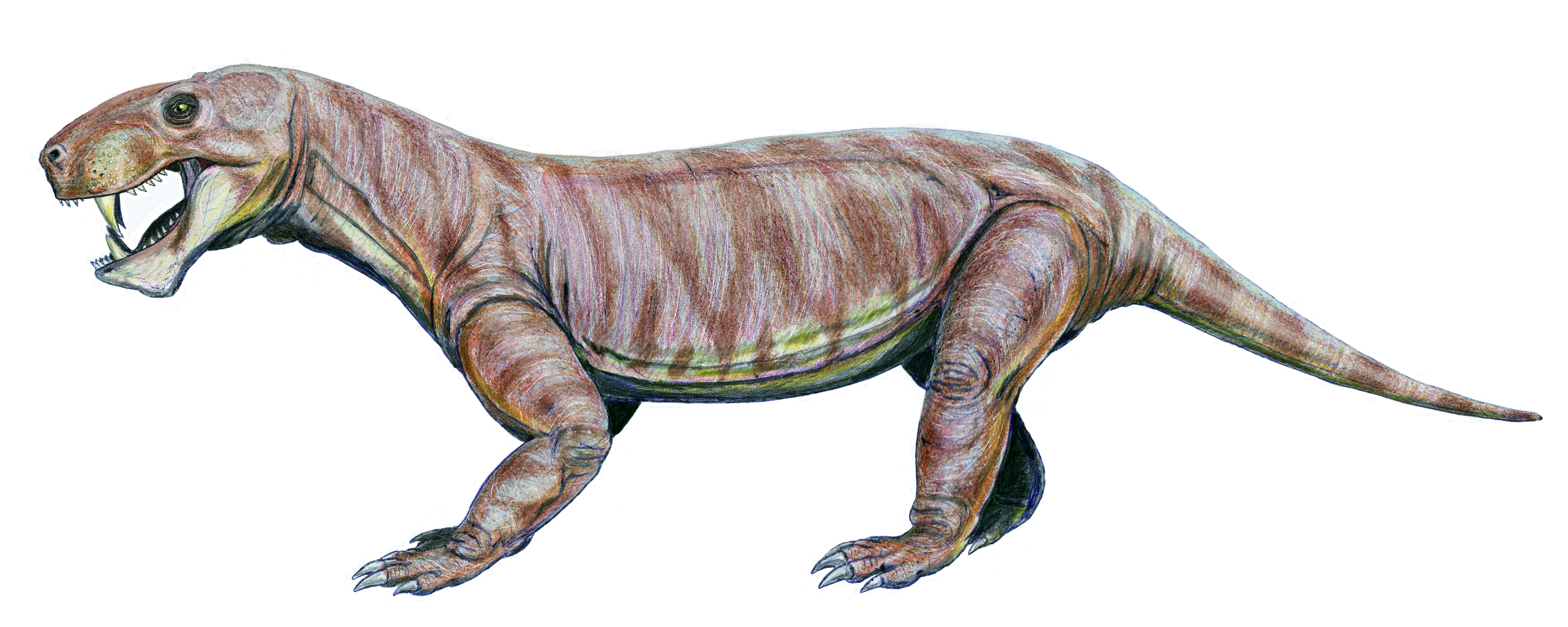
Life restoration of S. progressus

The taxonomic position of Sauroctonus has changed many times over the decades. In 1974, the Russian paleontologist Leonid Petrovich Tatarinov classified Sauroctonus within the family Gorgonopsidae, and in the subfamily Cynariopinae, alongside various African genera such as Cynariops, Scylacognathus or Scylacops. In a book published in 1989, Sigogneau-Russell leaves Sauroctonus as a gorgonopsian whose placement is undetermined. Mikhail Ivakhnenko still classifies Sauroctonus within the Gorgonopsidae in 2003, without assigning it to any subtaxon. In his 2007 thesis, Gebauer considers Sauroctonus to be a basal Gorgonopsidae. These repetitive classification changes have left Sauroctonus in an uncertain position among the gorgonopsians, with some seeing it as close to the African genera, while others consider it to belong to a lineage in its own right.

It is from 2018 that paleontologists Christian Kammerer and Vladimir Masyutin definitively reclassify Sauroctonus in a group of Russian gorgonopsians, alongside the genera Inostrancevia, Pravoslavlevia and Suchogorgon, in particular for certain shared cranial characteristics, more precisely for close contact between the pterygoid and the vomer. This classification will be immediately followed by the next studies.

The following cladogram showing the position of Sauroctonus within Gorgonopsia follows Kammerer and Rubidge, 2022:

- Gorgonopsia
  - Nochnitsa
  - - Viatkogorgon
    - - "Russian clade"
        - Suchogorgon
        - - Sauroctonus
          - - Pravoslavlevia
            - Inostrancevia
      - "African clade"
        - Phorcys
        - Eriphostoma
        - Gorgonops
        - - Cynariops
          - - Lycaenops
            - - Smilesaurus
              - Arctops
            - - Arctognathus
              - Rubidgeinae

== Paleobiology ==
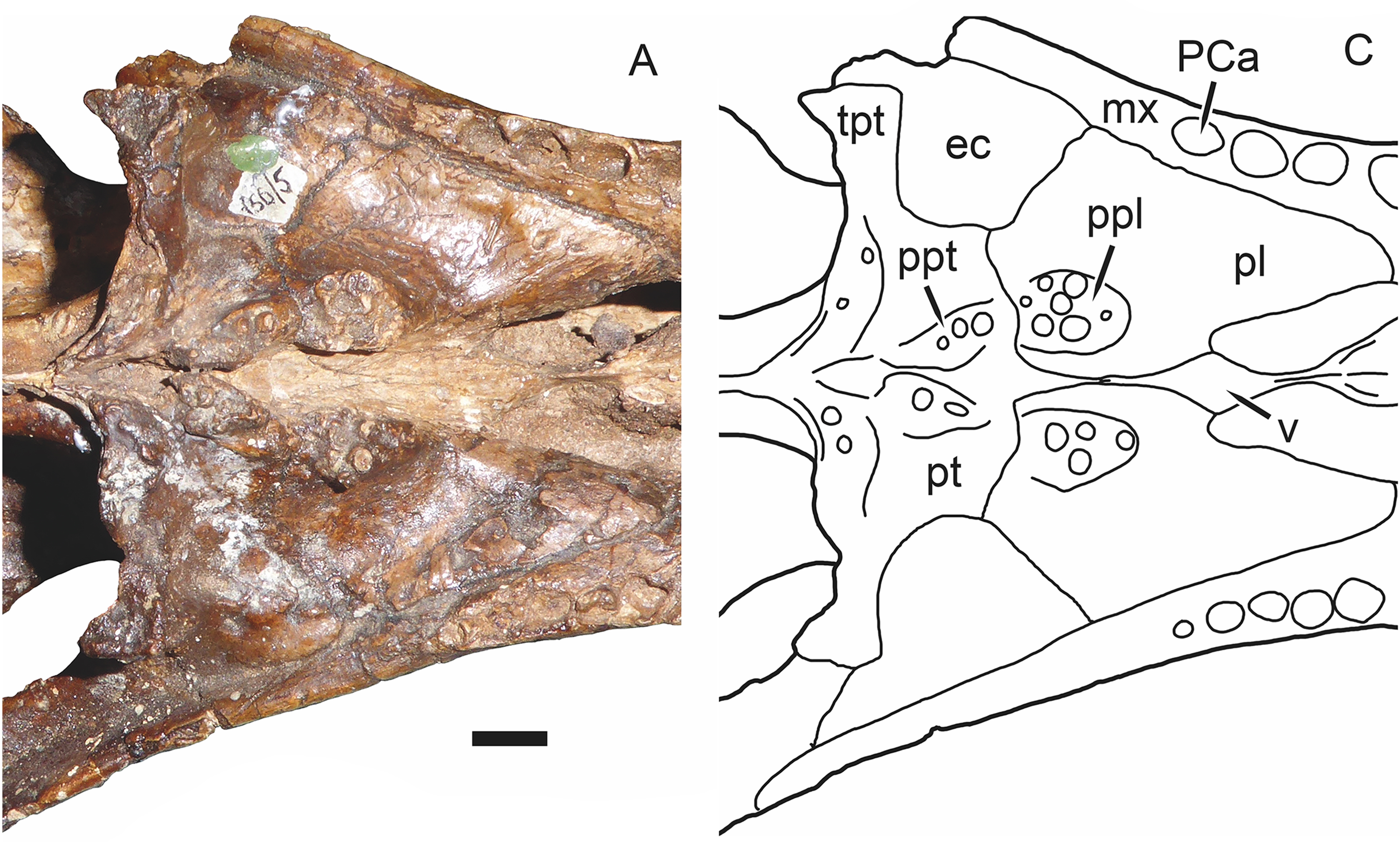
Photo and diagram showing the palate of S. progressus and its configuration of palatine and pterygoid tubercles with teeth (ppl and ppt)

One of the most recognizable features among gorgonopsians is the presence of long, saber-like canines on the upper and lower jaw. A study published in 2020 shows that several prehistoric predators with this comparable morphology would have had various possible prey-killing techniques. Among the gorgonopsians, Sauroctonus is found to have had a reduced jaw opening, unlike in the closely related Inostrancevia, indicating that it would not have been as specialized in hunting as the other representatives of the group.

== Paleoecology ==
S. progressus is known from the locality of Sjomin Ravine, located in the republic of Tatarstan, in the northeast of European Russia. This fossil site, discovered in 1938 and dating from the end of the Late Permian, is mainly represented by clays and silts with separated layers of fine polymictic sandstone, which contains fossils of tetrapods, represented by isolated bones and fragmentary skeletons, as well as rare flora remains. Apart from S. progressus, the main tetrapods identified in the area include the dicynodont therapsid Idelesaurus, the reptiliomorph Chroniosuchus, the temnospondyl Dvinosaurus, and even sauropsids, including the pareiasaur Scutosaurus and the archosauriform Eorasaurus.

Ilinskoe Subassemblage is thought to either be correlated with the Tropidostoma-Gorgonops Subzone of the Endothiodon Assemblage Zone.

== See also ==
- Inostrancevia
- Suchogorgon
