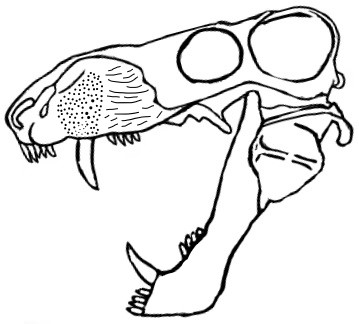
- Skull reconstruction based on the known fossil material. Foramina are indicated by dotted lines and are located near the snout

Scientific classification
- Kingdom: Animalia
- Phylum: Chordata
- Clade: Synapsida
- Clade: Therapsida
- Clade: †Gorgonopsia
- Family: †Gorgonopsidae
- Genus: †Suchogorgon; Tatarinov, 2000

Type species
- Suchogorgon golubevi Tatarinov, 2000

= Suchogorgon =

Suchogorgon Temporal range: Late Permian (Wuchiapingian), 259–255 Ma

Extinct genus of therapsids

Suchogorgon is a genus of gorgonopsian (a type of therapsid, the group that includes modern mammals) that lived during the Late Permian in what is now Russia. The only known species, S. golubevi, was first described in 2000 by Leonid P. Tatarinov on the basis of cranial and vertebral remains discovered at a locality in Vologda Oblast, near the Sukhona River, previously referred to the related genus Sauroctonus. The generic name refers to the river and the related genus Gorgonops—the gorgons of Greek mythology are often referenced in the names of the group. The specific name honors the paleontologist Valeriy K. Golubev. Additional cranial remains from the same oblast were subsequently referred to this taxon after its initial description.

With an estimated body length exceeding one meter, including a skull of about 25 cm (9.8 in), Suchogorgon was a medium-sized gorgonopsian. Like other members of the group, its skull was narrow and relatively low, with an elongated snout and serrated teeth. The canines (the saber teeth) were laterally compressed and sharp, associated with five to six small postcanine teeth. Suchogorgon is notably characterized by the presence of small foramina on the maxilla and in the region between the eye sockets. The middle ear and mandibular regions also display an unusual combination of features, including a gracile and flattened stapes and an elongated, anteriorly curved postarticular process, forming a distinctive morphological complex among gorgonopsians.

Phylogenetic analyses published since 2018 place Suchogorgon within a clade composed exclusively of Russian gorgonopsians, with the exception of the basalmost (earliest-diverging) Nochnitsa and Viatkogorgon. Unlike most gorgonopsians, generally considered strictly terrestrial, Suchogorgon may have frequented environments close to water, possibly adopting a partially semiaquatic lifestyle. The presence of cranial depressions interpreted as sensory structures suggests heightened sensitivity, potentially related to the detection of vibrations. Its masticatory apparatus also exhibits distinctive features, with relative jaw mobility facilitating the slicing of prey. Morphological evidence further indicates that thermoregulation and hearing were likely limited but functional. The fossil record indicates that Suchogorgon coexisted with various tetrapods, among which it likely preyed them.

== Research history ==
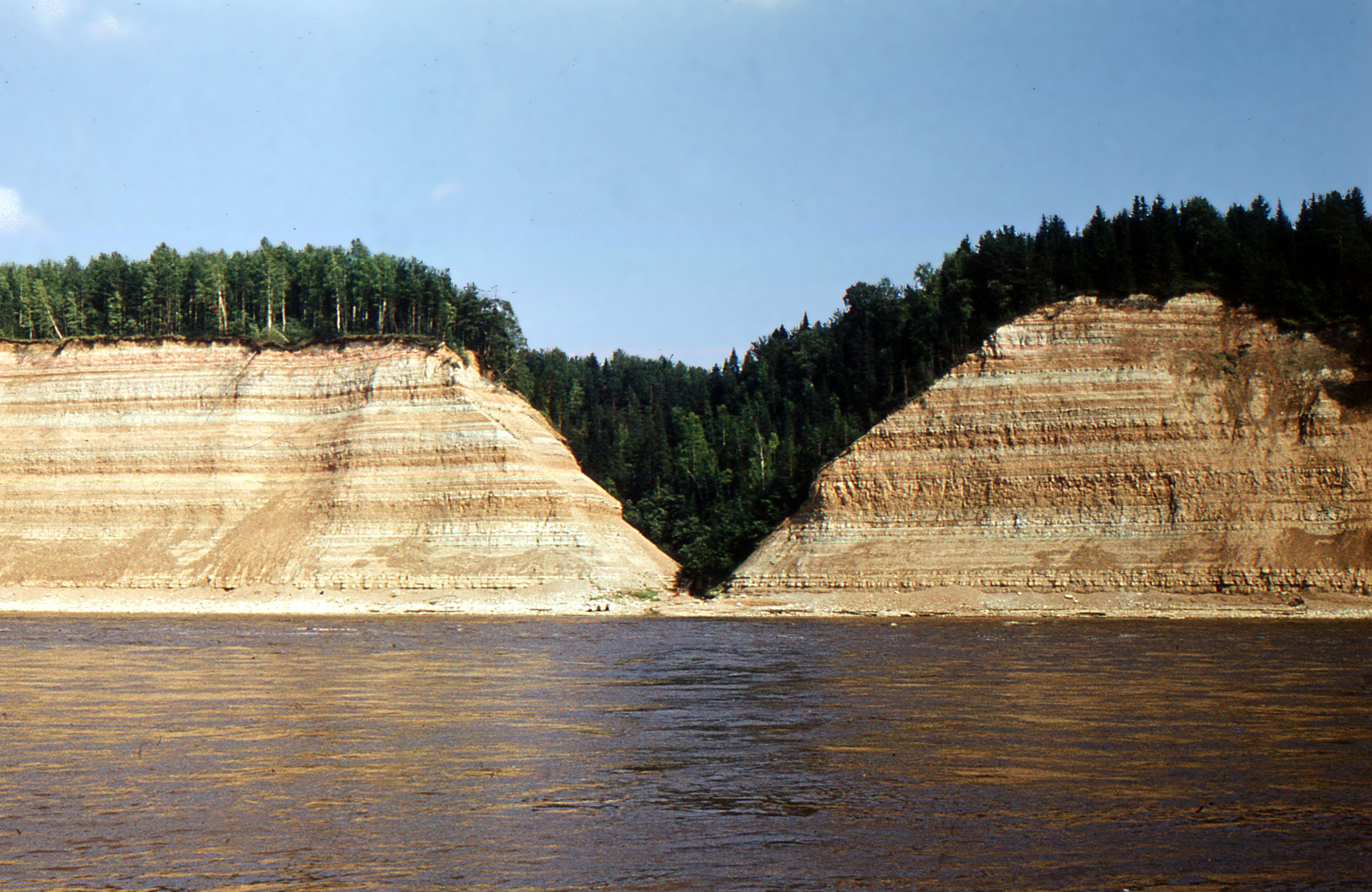
Cliffs along the Sukhona River dating to the Late Permian, from which Suchogorgon was discovered.

The first known specimens of Suchogorgon come from the Ust'e Strel'ny locality, near the town of Veliky Ustyug, in Russia's Vologda Oblast. The Ust’e Strel’ny locality contains a series of Permian exposures on the banks of the Sukhona River. The fossils consist mainly of partially preserved cranial remains that are taphonomically distorted (changes occurring during decay and fossilization), all of which are housed at the Paleontological Institute of the Russian Academy of Sciences in Moscow. The first discovery was made in the 1970s by paleontologists from Saratov, then part of the Soviet Union. About twenty years later, a team from Moscow uncovered a second skull. More extensive excavations at the site subsequently revealed three additional skulls as well as numerous isolated bones.

While some of these specimens had previously been assigned to Sauroctonus aff. progressus, they were ultimately described in 2000 as belonging to a new genus and species of gorgonopsian, Suchogorgon golubevi, by the Russian paleontologist Leonid P. Tatarinov. The generic name Suchogorgon refers to the Sukhona River, and to Gorgonops, the name of a related genus. The name "gorgon", referring to the monstrous hags of Greek mythology, is often used in the generic names of gorgonopsians. The specific epithet golubevi honors the Russian paleontologist Valeriy K. Golubev. The holotype, catalogued under the numbers PIN 4548/1 and 4548/3, consists of an incomplete skull including the occipital region, the complete right mandibular ramus, the postdentary portion of the left side of the mandible, as well as neural arches, a proatlas, an atlas, and the left arch of the epistropheus (the first bones of the vertebral column).

In 2003, the Russian paleontologist Mikhail F. Ivakhnenko reported additional fossils of Suchogorgon discovered at another locality in Vologda Oblast, Poteryakha-2, in the Nyuksensky District. These remains, also previously referred to Sauroctonus, are nevertheless less complete than those from Ust'e Strel'ny, consisting of a canine, a periotic bone (an inner ear bone), and a right maxilla. In a paper published two years later, in 2005, Ivakhnenko revisited the study of Suchogorgon, describing its anatomy in detail based on all known material. He also referred an additional skull described as "exploded", discovered in the early 2000s at the Ust'e Strel'ny locality, shortly after the publication of the original description of the taxon by Tatarinov.

== Description ==
Although the postcranial elements of Suchogorgon are poorly documented, the length of its skull, reaching about 80 cm (31 in), suggest a body size slightly exceeding one meter, making it a medium-sized gorgonopsian. The skull of Suchogorgon was generally narrow and relatively low, giving it a characteristic elongated profile. The nasal bone, notably well developed, reached about one and a half times the length of the frontal, while the preorbital region remained proportionally short, not exceeding three times the horizontal diameter of the already small eye socket. The surface of several cranial bones, particularly the maxilla and the interorbital region, was ornamented with small oval foramina, suggesting a distinctive external texture. The palatine bone bore prominent tubercles with well-developed teeth, indicating an active role in prey handling. The dentition consisted of a flattened, cutting canines, accompanied by five to six serrated small postcanine teeth.

The posterior region of the skull and mandible showed a combination of unusual features: the stapes, slender and flattened, possessed a large opening and lacked a distinct dorsal process; the postarticular process of the mandible was elongate, anteriorly curved and compressed, with no clear evidence of muscle attachment; and a groove ran along the ventral margin of the angular bone anterior to the external angular flange, extending posteriorly along the anterior and medial edge of the postarticular process. This set of traits formed an unusual morphological configuration of the middle ear and mandibular articulation, likely related to functional specializations that remain debated.

== Classification ==
Gorgonopsians being a group of therapsids with little morphological variation, they had a long uncertain internal classification, with different lineages primarily distinguished by variable cranial proportions and often ambiguous characters. In his 2000 description, Tatarinov placed Suchogorgon within the subfamily Cynariopinae of the family Gorgonopsidae, based on features such as relatively large orbits, a narrow interorbital region, and cranial proportions consistent with a medium-sized, generalist terrestrial predator, somewhat dog-like in appearance. In 2002, Ivakhnenko considered Cynariopinae as a junior synonym of Scylacopinae, resulting in the transfer of Suchogorgon to that subfamily, a classification he retained in his subsequent works.

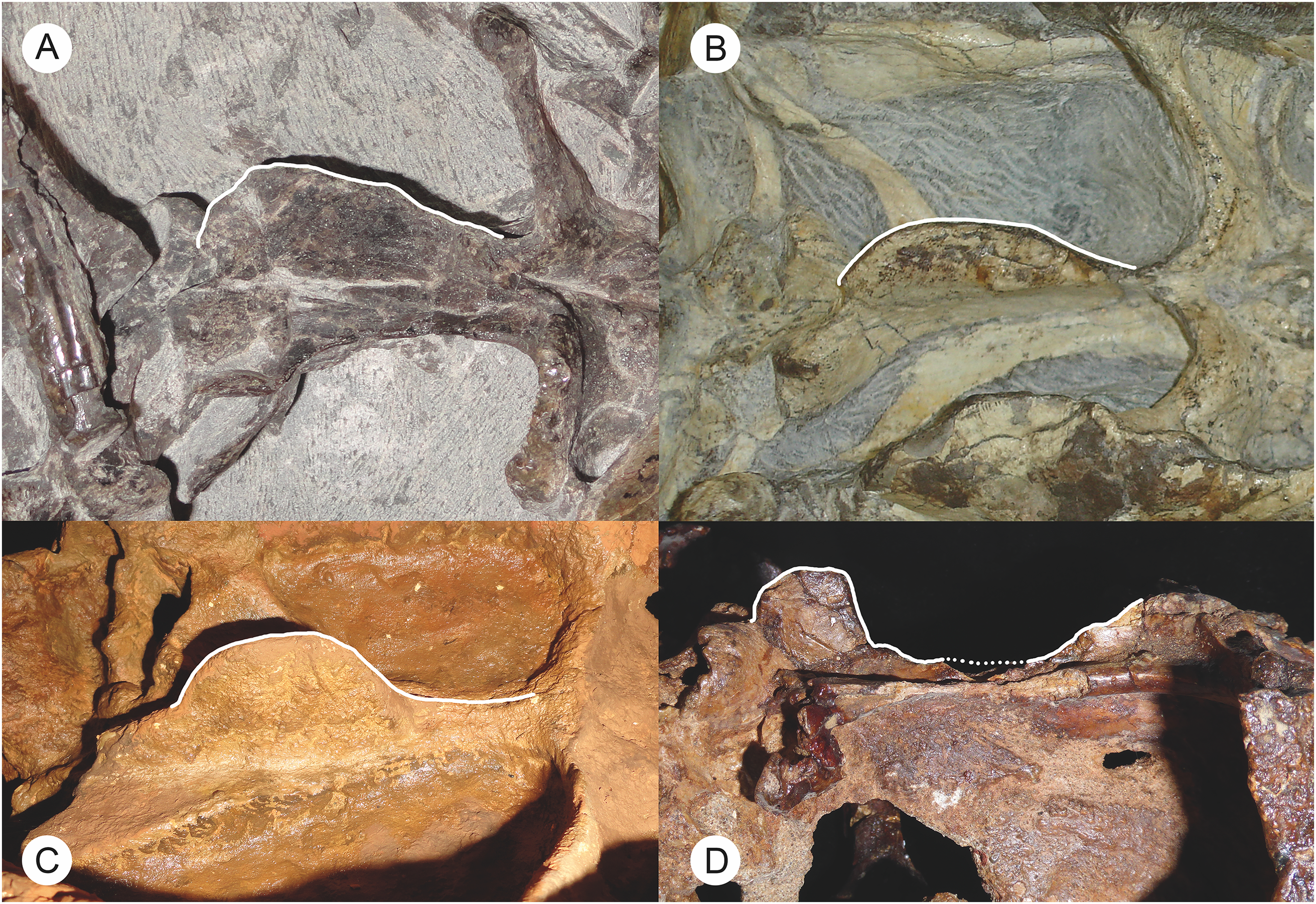
Comparison of the parabasisphenoid blades among gorgonopsians (outlined in white, dashed lines indicating a broken area), elongated and inclined in African forms (A–B; Eriphostoma and Gorgonops), but short in Russian forms (C–D; Inostrancevia and Sauroctonus).

In a 2018 paper, the American paleontologist Christian F. Kammerer and his Russian colleague Vladimir Masyutin found that all Russian gorgonopsian genera, with the exception of the more basal forms Nochnitsa and Viatkogorgon, would form a distinct clade separated from the African representatives. In their phylogenetic analysis, Suchogorgon was recovered as the most basal member of this "Russian clade", followed by Sauroctonus, Pravoslavlevia, and the large Inostrancevia. Although the authors acknowledged that the monophyly of this group is weakly supported, they argued for its validity on the basis of a possible palatal synapomorphy: a close contact between the pterygoid and the vomer, a feature observed in three of the four genera concerned. Pravoslavlevia was nevertheless included in this clade despite its poorly preserved palate, due to cranial characters shared with Inostrancevia. This observation contradicted earlier studies that had proposed that all gorgonopsians exhibited a median contact between the palatines, excluding the vomer from contacting the pterygoid. However, this type of contact was indeed present and appeared markedly closer than in any other therapsid groups. Kammerer and Masyutin also indicated that these Russian genera differed from African forms in the morphology of the parabasisphenoid blade of the braincase. In the latter group, this blade extended along the entire length of the braincase (although this condition had been lost in rubidgeines), whereas in the "Russian clade" it took the form of a plate restricted to the posterior portion of the braincase. This condition, more similar to that observed in therocephalians, may even have represents an ancestral state among theriodonts.

The following cladogram showing the position of Suchogorgon within Gorgonopsia follows Macungo et al. (2026):

- Gorgonopsia
  - Nochnitsa
  - - Viatkogorgon
    - - "Russian clade"
        - Suchogorgon
        - - Sauroctonus
          - - Pravoslavlevia
            - Inostrancevia
      - "African clade"
        - - Eriphostoma
          - - Gorgonops
            - - Jirahgorgon
              - Phorcys
        - - Cynariops
          - - Lycaenops
            - - - Arctops
                - - DA21/17-01-01
                    (Port des Canonge Fm. gorgonopsian)
                  - Smilesaurus
              - - Arctognathus
                - Rubidgeinae

In contrast, previous analyses had not found gorgonopsians to be grouped geographically, Russian genera such as Suchogorgon even having been considered closely related to African forms. Kammerer and Masyutin found it surprising since there were many Russo-African sister taxon relationships between other therapsid groups, dicynodonts and burnetiamorphs in particular. This indicated there had been an extensive dispersal of coeval therapsid groups between continents. They cautioned that the paleobiogeography of tetrapod animals (ancestrally four-limbed vertebrates) during the Permian remained poorly understood, with the expected dispersal abilities of various therapsid groups often differing from what can be seen in the fossil record and suggested more research was needed.

== Paleobiology ==
=== Feeding ===
Although gorgonopsians are generally interpreted as terrestrial predators, Tatarinov (2000) noted that Suchogorgon may have been one of the few known representatives not strictly fitting this model. The fossil record in which its remains are found suggests that it may have frequented environments close to water. He also pointed out that the presence of small oval depressions on the cranial bones, particularly around the orbits, could correspond to specialized sensory structures, possibly related to the detection of vibrations or electrical signals in aquatic settings. Taken together, this evidence suggests that Suchogorgon may have been adapted to coastal or near-water environments, potentially semiaquatic and a generalist predator without marked trophic specialization. This lifestyle is reminiscent of another Russian gorgonopsian, Viatkogorgon, which exhibits skeletal features that may suggest it was a relatively good swimmer.

Ivakhnenko further noted that the jaws of Suchogorgon exhibit a particularly unusual functional mechanism. The bones of the upper jaw may have been slightly mobile during biting, causing a slight rotation of the canines and allowing them to align with those of the lower jaw, forming an effective slicing apparatus. The mandible would thus have performed a back-and-forth motion comparable to that of a piston, while the teeth, reminiscent of those of snakes, facilitated the transport of prey toward the back of the throat.

=== Sensory functions ===
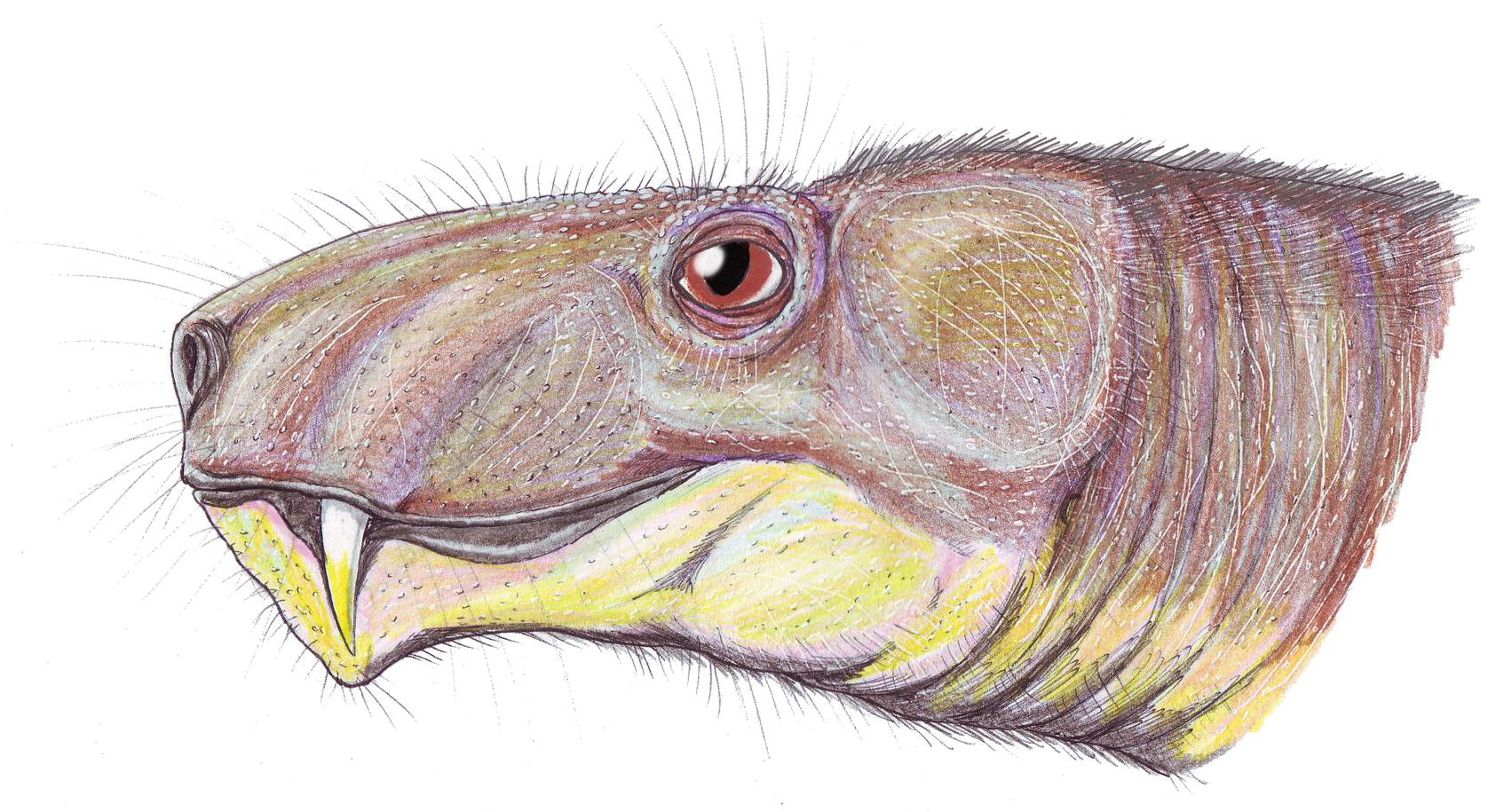
Life restoration of Suchogorgon's head, here depicted with vibrissae and some hair.

Tatarinov (2000) suggested that the animal likely possessed thick lips, well-developed salivary glands, and vibrissae distributed across the snout, near the eyes, and on the chin, indicating a high degree of tactile sensitivity. He also noted that the interorbital region of the skull displays rows of small oval depressions connected to a large blood-filled cavity. These structures have been interpreted either as specialized sensory organs, possibly electroreceptors comparable to those of some aquatic animals, or as integumentary formations of another nature, their exact function remaining uncertain.

Thermoregulation in Suchogorgon appears to have been relatively primitive. Cavities on the forehead, associated with extensive vascularization, are generally interpreted as a rudimentary heat-dissipation system, comparable to structures observed in some therapsids such as the dinocephalians Estemmenosuchus and Ulemosaurus. The auditory system is also distinctive: a large tympanum located at the rear of the lower jaw would have received vibrations transmitted to the inner ear. It is possible that hearing was effective only when the mouth was open, allowing certain skeletal elements to come into contact. This hearing, likely limited to a narrow range of frequencies, may have played a role in communication, particularly in reproduction or territorial defense.

== Paleoenvironment ==
The Ust'e Strel'ny and Poteryakha-2 localities, from which the fossils of Suchogorgon are known, belong to the Ilinskoe Subassemblage, a stratigraphic unit dated to the late Severodvinian stage in Russian stratigraphy. According to the International Commission on Stratigraphy, this interval corresponds to a significant portion of the Wuchiapingian stage of the Late Permian, approximately between 259 and 255 million years ago. At both localities, Suchogorgon was contemporaneous with numerous other tetrapod vertebrates, on which it likely preyed. The only other therapsid present was the anomodont Suminia. The remaining tetrapods included the reptiliomorphs Chroniosuchus and Karpinskiosaurus, as well as the temnospondyl Dvinosaurus.
