= Pavel Pravoslavlev =

Russian geologist and paleontologist

Pavel Aleksandrovich Pravoslavlev
- Павел Александрович Православлев
- Born: 4 (16) October 1873; Rakhinka, Russia
- Died: 12 October 1941; Leningrad
- Citizenship: Russian Empire, Soviet Union
- Education: Warsaw University
- Known for: Stratigraphy of the Volga and Caspian Sea region; describing new reptile species
- Scientific career
- Fields: Geology, Paleontology

Pavel Aleksandrovich Pravoslavlev (Russian: Павел Александрович Православлев; 4 (16) October 1873, in Rakhinka – 12 October 1941, in Leningrad) was a Russian and Soviet geologist, stratigrapher, and paleontologist. Pravoslavlev's principal research dealt with the stratigraphic and paleontologic study of Neogene and Anthropogenic deposits in the Volga and Caspian Sea regions. He worked at Saint Petersburg University (then Leningrad University).

Pavel Pravoslavlev was the son of a rural Orthodox priest.

== Early life and education ==
In 1894–1898, he studied at the Warsaw University, where he became interested in geology and was retained as a "professor candidate" (18 February 1899 - 18 February 1902) to continue studies under the supervision of Professor Vladimir Amalitskii.

In 1902–1909, Pravoslavlev worked as a laboratory assistant at the geological office of the Warsaw University.

From 1 April 1909 to 29 September 1913, he held the position of Professor of Geology and Paleontology and Head of the Mining Department at the Don Polytechnic Institute in Novocherkassk.

In 1913, he researched the remains of extinct reptiles from the Don River region at the British Museum. While in London, he left his signature on the Lady Smith Woodward's (wife of Arthur Smith Woodward) tablecloth. Pravoslavlev named one of the species, Elasmosaurus amalitskii, based on a specimen containing vertebrae, limb girdles, and limb bones. However, Pervushov and colleagues considered E. amalitskii an indeterminate elasmosaurid.

From 1915, Pravoslavlev had worked at St. Petersburg University (then Leningrad University).

After the death of Amalitskii, Pravoslavlev described new species of the Late Permian fossil vertebrate fauna from the North Dvina River, Arkhangelsk District, Northern European Russia. In 1927, he published the first formal description of Inostrancevia, an extinct genus of large carnivorous therapsids. In his monograph, he named several additional species and revised in detail the morphology of the two known skeletons of I. alexandri. Of all the named species, I. latifrons was the only one recognised as a clearly distinct species within the genus, being based on skulls discovered within Arkhangelsk Oblast as well as a very incomplete skeleton from the village of Zavrazhye, located in Vladimir Oblast. Although Pravoslavlev's work was of significant importance, a reexamination of the skeletal anatomy is needed to broaden the understanding of the animal's biology.

He was the first one who described the Atelian sediments, identified by him in the lower reaches of the Volga River and on the Volga-Ural interfluve. The sediments correspond to a regressive stage in the Late Pleistocene history of the Caspian Sea, known as the Atelian regression.

Pavel Pravoslavlev died in Leningrad on 12 October 1941.

=== Memory ===
In 1948, Fedorov named an extinct Caspian Mollusca Didacna pravoslavlevi after Pavel Pravoslavlev.

In 1952, Vjuschkov named an extinct genus of gorgonopsian therapsids Pravoslavlevia after him.
