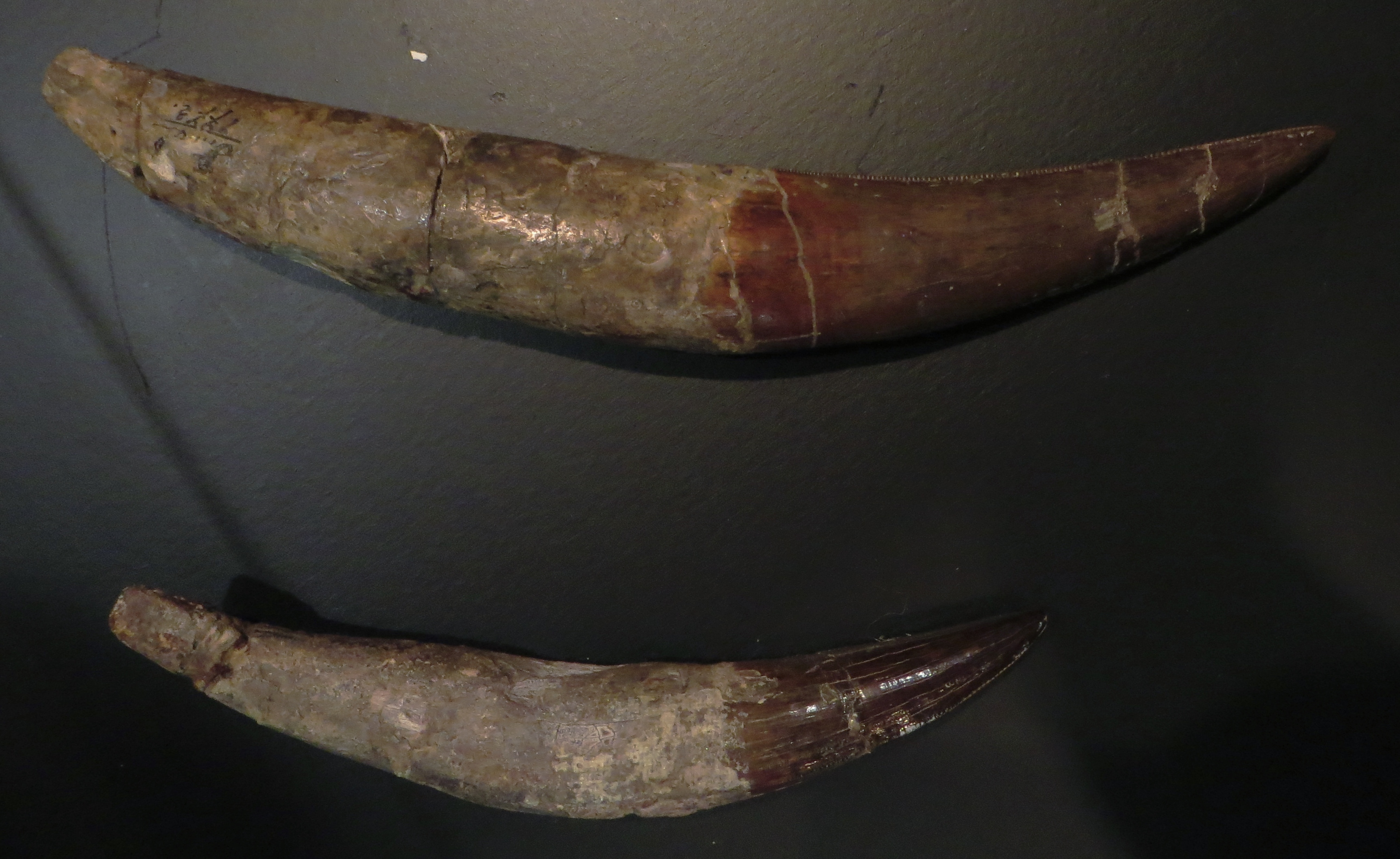
- The referred incisor of Leogorgon (PIN 4549/14; bottom), compared with a canine tooth of Inostrancevia (top), both exhibited in Dinosaurium, Prague

Scientific classification
- Kingdom: Animalia
- Phylum: Chordata
- Clade: Synapsida
- Clade: Therapsida
- Clade: †Gorgonopsia (?)
- Genus: †Leogorgon; Ivakhnenko, 2003
- Species: †L. klimovensis

Binomial name
- †Leogorgon klimovensis Ivakhnenko, 2003

= Leogorgon =

Leogorgon Temporal range: Late Permian, (Wuchiapingian), 255–254 Ma

Extinct genus of dubious therapsids

Leogorgon is a potentially dubious genus of large therapsids that lived during the Late Permian period in what is now Russia. The only known species, L. klimovensis, was first described in 2003 by Mikhail F. Ivakhnenko on the basis of a partial braincase and an isolated incisor, both discovered in the fossil deposits of Vologda Oblast. The generic name honors the Russian paleontologist Leonid P. Tatarinov and also refers to the Gorgons of Greek mythology, from which the gorgonopsians are named after, the taxon having initially been assigned to this group.

At the time of its original description in 2003, Ivakhnenko identified Leogorgon as the first gorgonopsian of the subfamily Rubidgeinae known from Russia, but revised this interpretation in 2008, considering it instead as a possible phtinosuchid. He also estimated a skull length of about 70 cm (28 in), which would make Leogorgon the largest known gorgonopsian. However, its original identification were later questioned in a revision published in 2016, which suggested that the holotype braincase might belong to a dicynodont, while the referred incisor remains indistinguishable from those of the large gorgonopsian Inostrancevia.

== History ==
In 2003, the Russian paleontologist Mikhail F. Ivakhnenko described a new genus and species of therapsid, which he identified as a gorgonopsian, Leogorgon klimovensis. This description is based on a partial braincase designated as the holotype, as well as an isolated incisor, both discovered at the Klimovo-1 locality (from which the specific name is derived), in Russia's Vologda Oblast. In Russian stratigraphy, the site is dated to the Lower Vyatkian, a time interval that largely corresponds to the end of the Wuchiapingian stage of the Late Permian according to the International Commission on Stratigraphy. These two fossil specimens, initially reported by Ivakhnenko in a work published two years earlier, are housed at the Paleontological Institute of the Russian Academy of Sciences in Moscow under their respective catalogue numbers PIN 4549/13 and PIN 4549/14. The generic name Leogorgon honors the Russian paleontologist Leonid P. Tatarinov, who had previously named the small gorgonopsian Viatkogorgon ivakhnenkoi in 1999 in honor of Ivakhnenko. The name "gorgon", referring to the monstrous hags of Greek mythology, is often used in the generic names of gorgonopsians.

After limiting himself to a comparison with South African rubidgeines in his 2001 work, Ivakhnenko identified Leogorgon in his 2003 paper as the first representative of this subfamily known from Russia. He based this assignment on the morphology of the holotype braincase, which exhibits a short and tall paroccipital process (the lateral part of the occipital bone), considered comparable only to that of Dinogorgon among members of the group. As for the single incisor attributed to the taxon, he described it as similar to those of Inostrancevia, while suggesting it could be distinguished by a more weakly-faceted crown and a more developed mesial cutting edge. Based on comparisons with genera he regarded as related, Ivakhnenko estimated the complete skull length at around 70 cm (28 in), which would make Leogorgon the largest known gorgonopsian, exceeding the already considerable cranial dimensions of Inostrancevia and Rubidgea, which exceed 40 cm (16 in).

In 2008, however, Ivakhnenko noted that, due to its poorly known anatomy, Leogorgon could be a relative of the Russian Phthinosuchidae rather than the sole Russian representative of Rubidgeinae. In a revision about the rubidgeines published in 2016, the American paleontologist Christian F. Kammerer questioned the original identification proposed by Ivakhnenko. He noted that most of the characters cited to assign Leogorgon to the Rubidgeinae are also present in other gorgonopsians. Kammerer pointed out in particular that the morphology of the paroccipital process is comparable to that of taxa other than Dinogorgon, such as Arctognathus, and even suggested that the holotype braincase might belong to a dicynodont, based on its tall opisthotic (an inner ear bone). By contrast, the referred incisor does indeed belong to a gorgonopsian, but the supposed differences from those of Inostrancevia are not clearly established and may simply result from the state of its preservation, as observed in other fossils of that genus. This suggests that Leogorgon may represent a chimeric and probably non-diagnostic taxon, being a probable nomen dubium.
