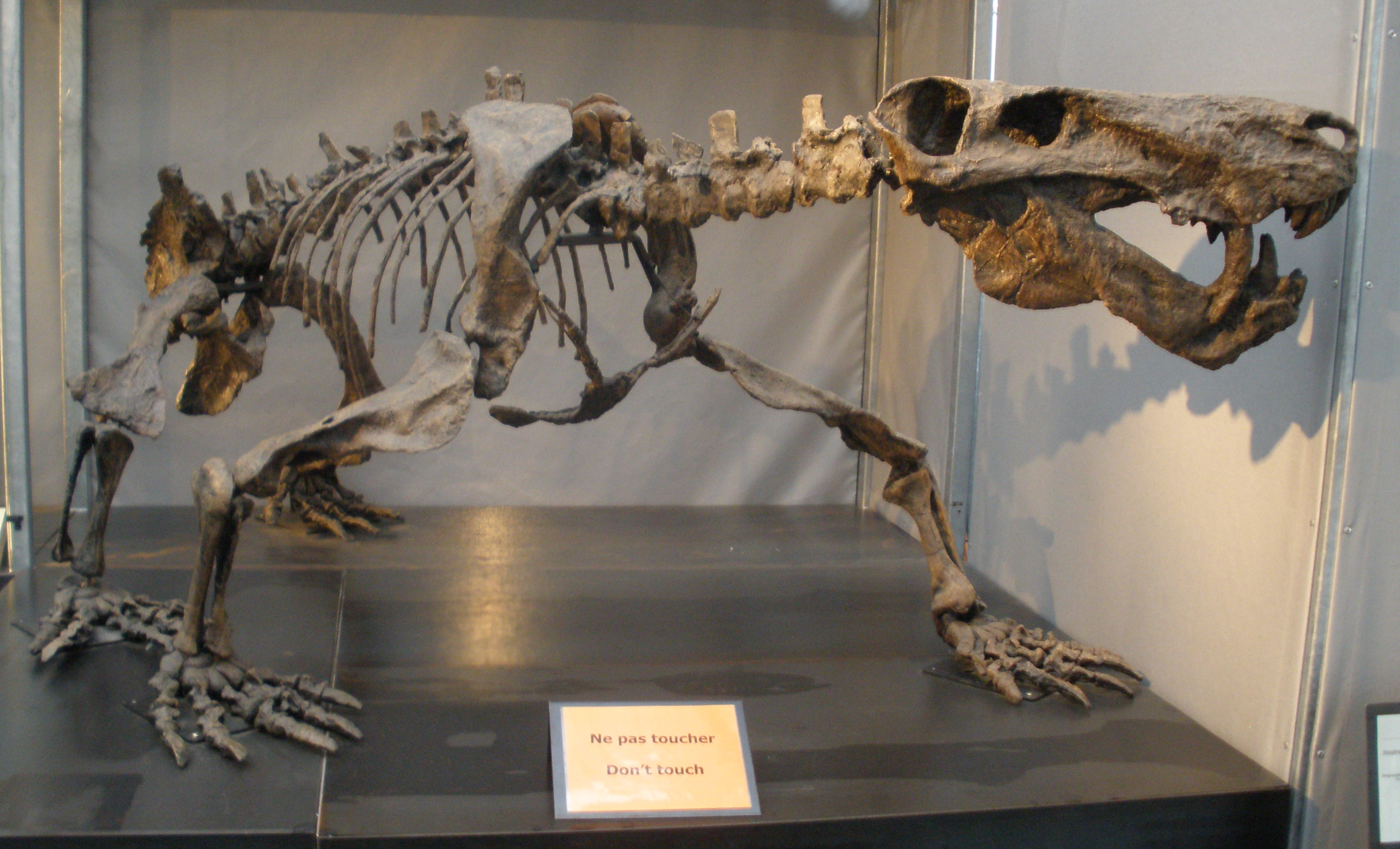
- Skeleton mount of Inostrancevia alexandri

Scientific classification
- Kingdom: Animalia
- Phylum: Chordata
- Clade: Synapsida
- Clade: Therapsida
- Clade: †Gorgonopsia
- Subfamily: †Inostranceviinae; Pravoslavlev, 1927

Genera
- †Inostrancevia; †Pravoslavlevia

= Inostranceviinae =

Inostranceviines Temporal range: Late Permian c. 256–251.9 Ma

Extinct subfamily of therapsids

Inostranceviinae is an extinct subfamily of gorgonopsid therapsids that lived during the Late Permian. The subfamily consisted of two genera, Inostrancevia and Pravoslavlevia. While Pravoslavlevia is only known in Eastern Europe, Inostrancevia was found in several formations within Africa.
