= Atelian regression =

Caspian Sea regression

The Atelian regression was a prolonged regression of the Caspian Sea in the middle of the Late Pleistocene. It occurred between the Khazarian transgression and the Khvalynian transgression. It is named after continental Atelian sediments identified by Pavel Pravoslavlev (1918) during his 1903-1932 work on Pleistocene geology of Sub-Caspian and Lower Volga regions in cross-sections of Northern Caspian Depression, who grouped them into the Atelian formation The basin of the regression is called Atelian basin. The term is derived from the historical name of Volga River (known in various local languages as Itil, Atil, Idel, Atel, etc.)

Some researchers postulate that it was a deep regression (over -100 to -150m), but researchers differ considerably with respect to its depth, age, and duration, e.g., claiming it was at about -20m relative to the Khazarian maximum.
