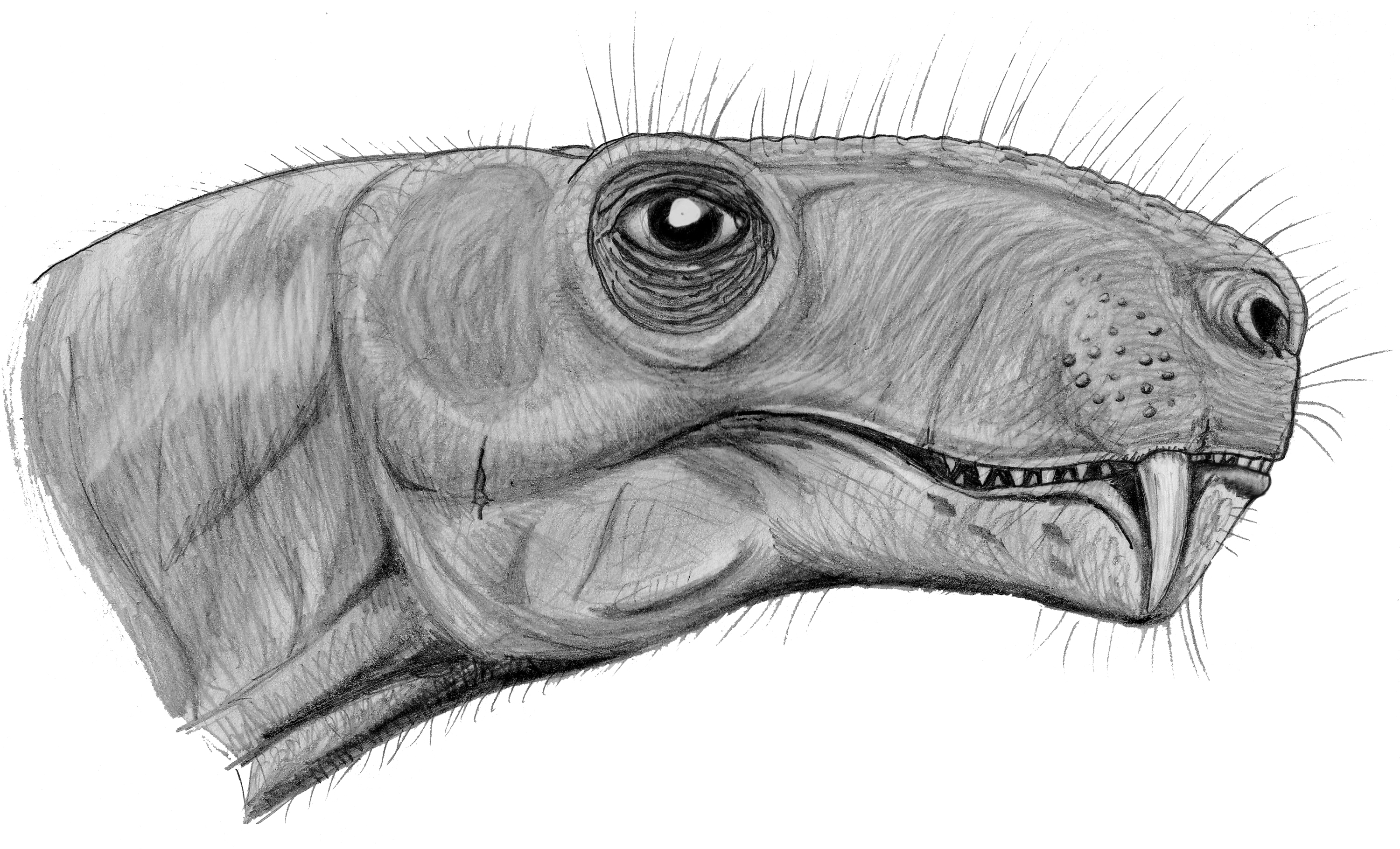
- Pravoslavlevia parva

Scientific classification
- Kingdom: Animalia
- Phylum: Chordata
- Clade: Synapsida
- Clade: Therapsida
- Clade: †Gorgonopsia
- Family: †Gorgonopsidae
- Subfamily: †Inostranceviinae
- Genus: †Pravoslavlevia; Vjuschkov, 1953

Type species
- †Pravoslavlevia parva Vjuschkov, 1953

= Pravoslavlevia =

Pravoslavlevia Temporal range: Late Permian

Extinct genus of therapsids

Pravoslavlevia is an extinct genus of gorgonopsian therapsids that lived in the late Permian and is part of the Sokolki subcomplex of Russia. It had a skull 22 centimetres (8.7 in) long. The total length of the animal was about 1.4 metres (4 ft 7 in). Only one species (P. parva) is known.

== Classification ==
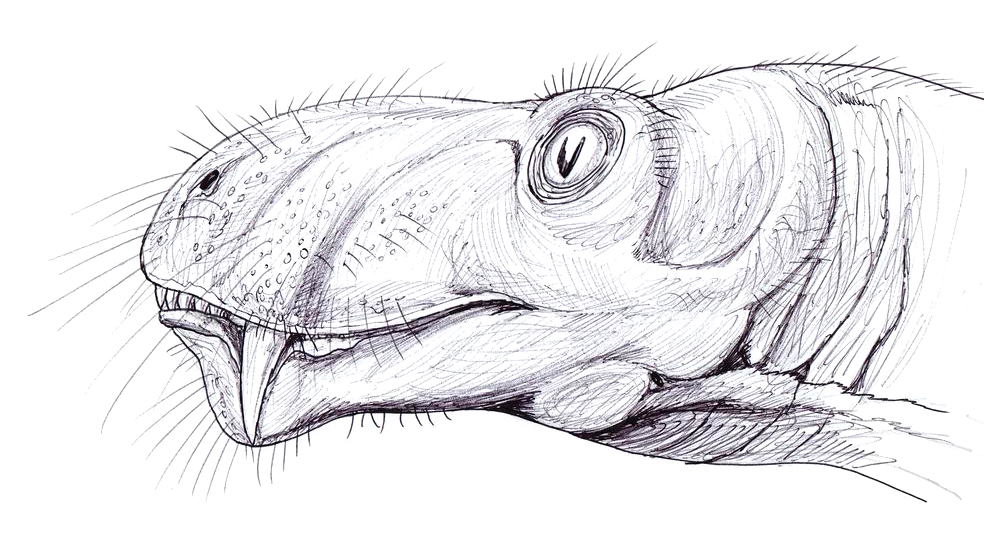
Pravoslavlevia

The following cladogram showing the position of Pravoslavlevia within Gorgonopsia follows Kammerer and Masyutin, 2018:

- Gorgonopsia
  - Nochnitsa
  - - Viatkogorgon
    - - Russian clade
        - Suchogorgon
        - - Sauroctonus
          - - Pravoslavlevia
            - Inostrancevia
      - African clade
        - Eriphostoma
        - - Gorgonops
          - - Arctognathus
            - Lycaenops
            - - Smilesaurus
              - Arctops
            - Rubidgeinae

== See also ==
- List of therapsids

== Sources ==
- paleodb.org
