= Rakhinka =

Rakhinka Рахинка
- Selo
- Location within Volgograd Oblast Location within Russia
- Coordinates: 49°00′N 44°55′E
- Country: Russia
- Region: Volgograd Oblast
- District: Sredneakhtubinsky District
- Time zone: UTC+4:00

Rakhinka (Russian: Рахинка) is a rural locality (a selo) and the administrative center of Rakhinskoye Rural Settlement, Sredneakhtubinsky District, Volgograd Oblast, Russia. The population was 2,493 as of 2010. There are 46 streets.

== Geography ==
Rakhinka is located on the east bank of the Volgograd Reservoir, 49 km northeast of Srednyaya Akhtuba (the district's administrative centre) by road. Verkhnepogromnoye is the nearest rural locality.
