= Zavrazhye =

Zavrazhye Завражье
- Village
- Location within Vladimir Oblast Location within Russia
- Coordinates: 56°13′N 42°23′E
- Country: Russia
- Region: Vladimir Oblast
- District: Vyaznikovsky District
- Time zone: UTC+3:00

Zavrazhye (Russian: Завражье) is a rural locality (a village) in Gorod Vyazniki, Vyaznikovsky District, Vladimir Oblast, Russia. The population was 14 as of 2010.

== Geography ==
Zavrazhye is located on the Klyazma River, 17 km east of Vyazniki (the district's administrative centre) by road. Oltushevo is the nearest rural locality.
