= Leonid Petrovich Tatarinov =

Russian palaentologist and evolutionary biologist (1926–2011)

- Born: 12 November 1926; Tula, USSR
- Died: 24 August 2011 (aged 84); Moscow, Russia
- Education: Moscow State University (1949); Doctor of Science (1970); Academician of the Russian Academy of Sciences
- Awards: Order of the Badge of Honour (1975); Medal “Friendship” (Mongolia) (1977); USSR State Prize (1978); Order of the Polar Star (Mongolia) (1982); Order of the Red Banner of Labour (1986); Order "For Merit to the Fatherland" IV class (1999)
- Scientific career
- Fields: Paleontology
- Workplaces: Paleontological Institute, Russian Academy of Sciences

Leonid Petrovich Tatarinov (Russian: Леонид Петрович Татаринов; 12 November 1926 – 24 August 2011) was a Russian and Soviet paleontologist and evolutionary biologist. He was an Academician of the USSR Academy of Sciences (1981) and Russian Academy of Sciences (1991), director of the Paleontological Institute (1975–1992) and editor-in-chief of Paleontological journal (Russian: Палеонтологический журнал) (1976–2001). His research interests were in the comparative anatomy of vertebrates, tetrapod phylogeny, and evolution.

Tatarinov became interested in science from his school years but he was conscripted into the army at the age of 17 in 1943 but discharged in 1944 after suffering from an infection. He then went to the Moscow State University and was influenced by A.F. Kohts, I.I. Schmalhausen, and Raissa L’vovna Berg. He studied population genetics under Berg and then took a keener interest in organismal evolution after being influenced by G.P. Dementiev. He studied amphibians under A.N. Druzhinin and B.S. Matveev. He then studied birds with E.P. Spangenberg. As a student he was a witness to the historic clash between Lysenko and the geneticists in 1948 which was to affect Soviet biology. In 1953 he received a PhD with a thesis “On the Role of Living Conditions in the Phylogeny of Amphibians.” In 1969 he received a D.Sc. for a thesis on “Problems of the Evolution of Theriodonts.” He became the director of the paleontological institute from 1975. Tatarinov believed in deep parallelisms in vertebrate evolution and did not accept the ideas of phylogeny reconstruction that make use of parsimonious character changes.
