= Mikhail Ivakhnenko =

Russian paleontologist

Mikhail Ivakhnenko, circa 1980s or 1990s.

Mikhail Feodosievich Ivakhnenko (30 September 1947 – 10 July 2015) was a Russian paleontologist. In the 1980s, he graduated with a PhD from the University of Leningrad with a dissertation on procolophonids. He later worked at the Paleontological Institute at the Russian Academy of Sciences. His research largely focused on Permian synapsids and reptiles, having published over 50 works and naming 130 new fossil species.

He was born in 1947 in Smolensk. He died in Ramesnkoye, Moscow. He is buried at the Bykovskoye Memorial Cemetery.
