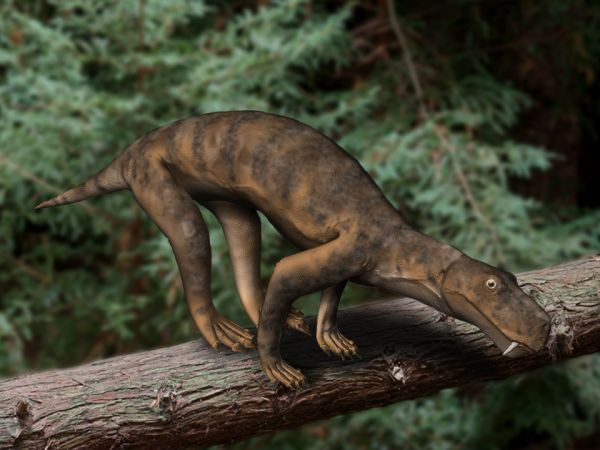
- Artist's interpretation of A. willistoni

Scientific classification
- Kingdom: Animalia
- Phylum: Chordata
- Clade: Synapsida
- Clade: Therapsida
- Clade: †Gorgonopsia
- Family: †Gorgonopsidae
- Genus: †Arctops; Watson, 1914

Type species
- Arctops willistoni Watson, 1914

Other species
- †A. umulunshi Mann & Sidor, 2025

Synonyms
- Synonyms of A. willistoni: A. watsoni Brink & Kitching, 1953; A. kitchingi Signogneau, 1970

= Arctops =

Arctops Temporal range: Late Permian

Extinct genus of therapsids

Arctops ("bear face") is an extinct genus of gorgonopsian therapsids known from the Late Permian of South and Eastern Africa. It measured up to 2 metres (6 ft 7 in) in length and its skull was 30 centimetres (12 in) long. The type species is Arctops willistoni, named from a poorly prepared and incomplete skull. A second species was named A. watsoni based on a complete skull in 1953, followed by a third in 1970, A. kitchingi, from a smaller, juvenile skull. Both were formally synonymized with A. willistoni by Christian Kammerer in 2017. An additional species, A. umulunshi, was described in 2025 from the Madumabisa Mudstone Formation of Zambia, named after the indigenous Icibemba word for "hunter".

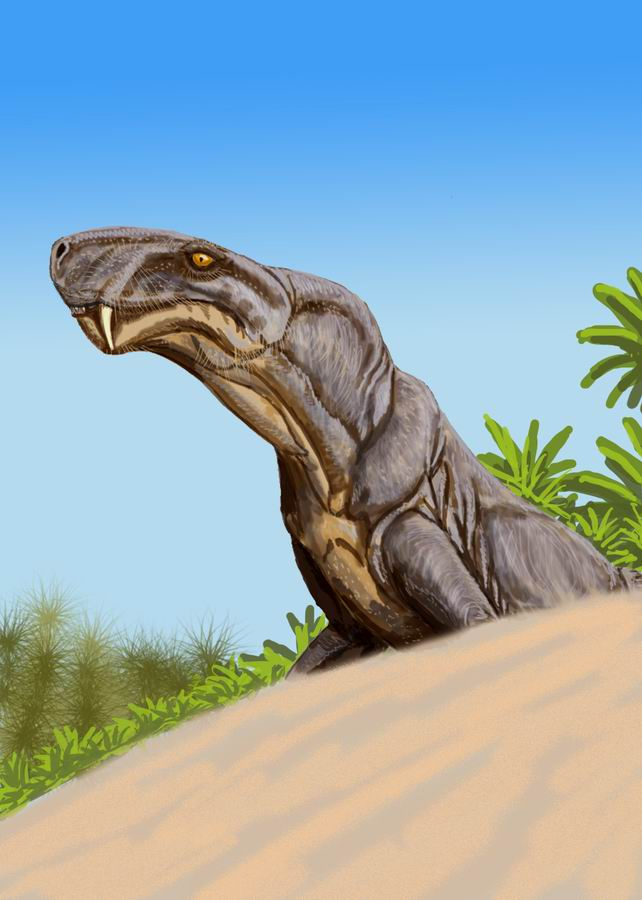
Artist's interpretation of A. willistoni
