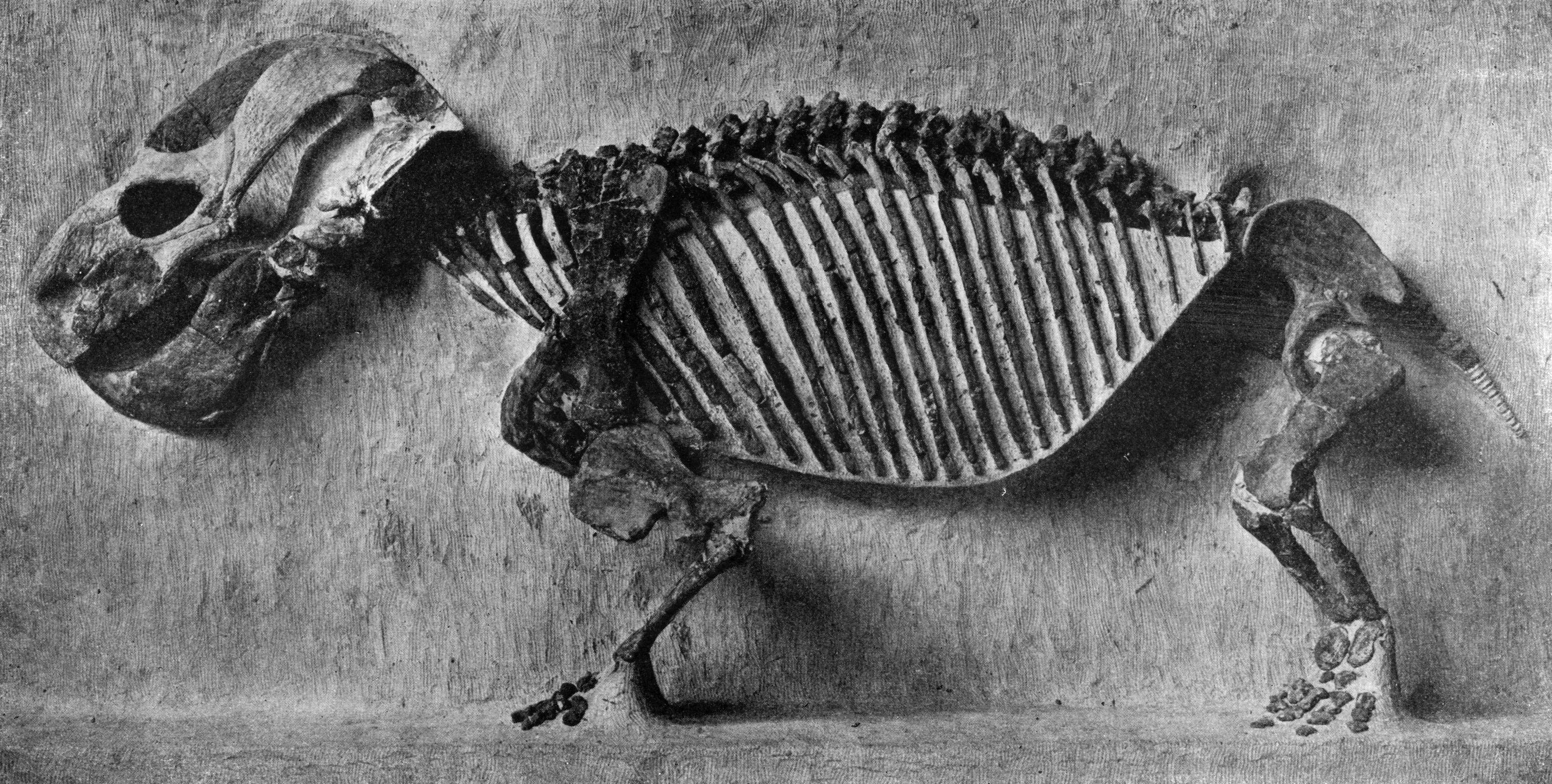
- Reconstructed skeleton of E. bathystoma specimen AMNH 5613

Scientific classification
- Kingdom: Animalia
- Phylum: Chordata
- Clade: Synapsida
- Clade: Therapsida
- Clade: †Anomodontia
- Clade: †Dicynodontia
- Family: †Endothiodontidae
- Genus: †Endothiodon; Owen, 1876

Type species
- †Endothiodon bathystoma Owen, 1876

Other species
- E. mahalanobisi Ray, 2000; E. tolani Cox & Angielczyk, 2015

Synonyms
- Genus synonymy: ?Cryptocynodon Seeley, 1894; Esoterodon Seeley, 1894; Emydochampsa Broom, 1912; Endogomphodon Broom, 1932; Pachytegos Haughton, 1932; Species synonymy: Synonyms of E. bathystoma: Endothiodon (Esoterodon) uniseries Owen, 1879 (Seeley, 1894); ?Cryptocynodon simus Seeley, 1894; Endothiodon (Emydochampsa) platyceps Broom, 1912 (Broom, 1912); Endothiodon (Esoterodon) whaitsi Broom, 1912 (Broom, 1912); Endothiodon (Esoterodon) paucidens Broom, 1915 (Broom, 1932); Endothiodon seeleyi Broom, 1915; Endothiodon crassus Broom, 1921; Endothiodon (Esoterodon) angusticeps Broom, 1923 (Broom, 1932); Endogomphodon minor Broom, 1932; Pachytegos stockleyi Haughton, 1932; Emydochampsa oweni Broili & Schröder, 1936

= Endothiodon =

Endothiodon Temporal range: Wuchiapingian, 259–254 Ma

Extinct genus of dicynodonts

Endothiodon (/ɛndoʊθiːoʊdɔːn/ "inner tooth" from Greek endothi (ἔνδοθῐ), "within", and odon (ὀδών), "tooth", most likely named for the characteristic of the teeth being placed internally to the maxilla) is an extinct genus of medium to large dicynodont from the Late Permian. Like other dicynodonts, Endothiodon was an herbivore, but it typically lacked the two tusks that characterized most other dicynodonts and instead had long rows of teeth inset in the jaws that replaced in waves. The anterior portion of the upper and lower jaw are curved upward, creating a distinct beak that is thought to have allowed them to be specialized grazers.

Endothiodon was widespread and is found across the southern region of what was then a single large continent known as Pangea. It was originally only found in southern Africa but has now also been found in eastern Africa, India and Brazil, which were both close to Africa at the time. The finding in Brazil marks the first dicynodont to be reported for the Permian of South America. This finding also shows that part of the Rio do Rasto Formation in Brazil can now be correlated with deposits in India, Malawi, Mozambique, South Africa, Tanzania, Zambia, and Zimbabwe.

Historically, nine named species in total from South Africa have been attributed to Endothiodon during the late 19th and early 20th centuries (sometimes variably split into distinct genera), but these were reduced down to just three accepted species of Endothiodon in 1964. In the 21st century, these three were further thought to likely represent only a single species, the original type species E. bathystoma, a conclusion upheld by a thorough revision of their taxonomy in 2024. A second valid species, E. mahalanobisi, was discovered in India and named in 2000. Although smaller than E. bathystoma, E. mahalanobisi is recognised as a distinct species rather than simply juveniles of E. bathystoma. Apart from size, E. mahalanobisi also has a pointed snout with only a single, low longitudinal ridge (compared to three raised crests on E. bathystoma), a narrow pineal foramen lacking a bony boss or collar, and a flat prefrontal bone. A third species was discovered in Tanzania and named E. tolani in 2015. Unlike the other species, E. tolani has a pair of small tusks. Although initially discovered in and thought to characterise separate regions, their ranges have since been found to overlap in eastern Africa, with potentially all three present in Mozambique. E. bathystoma appears to be particularly widespread, with a range from Brazil, through southern and eastern Africa and into India.

== Description ==
=== Skull ===
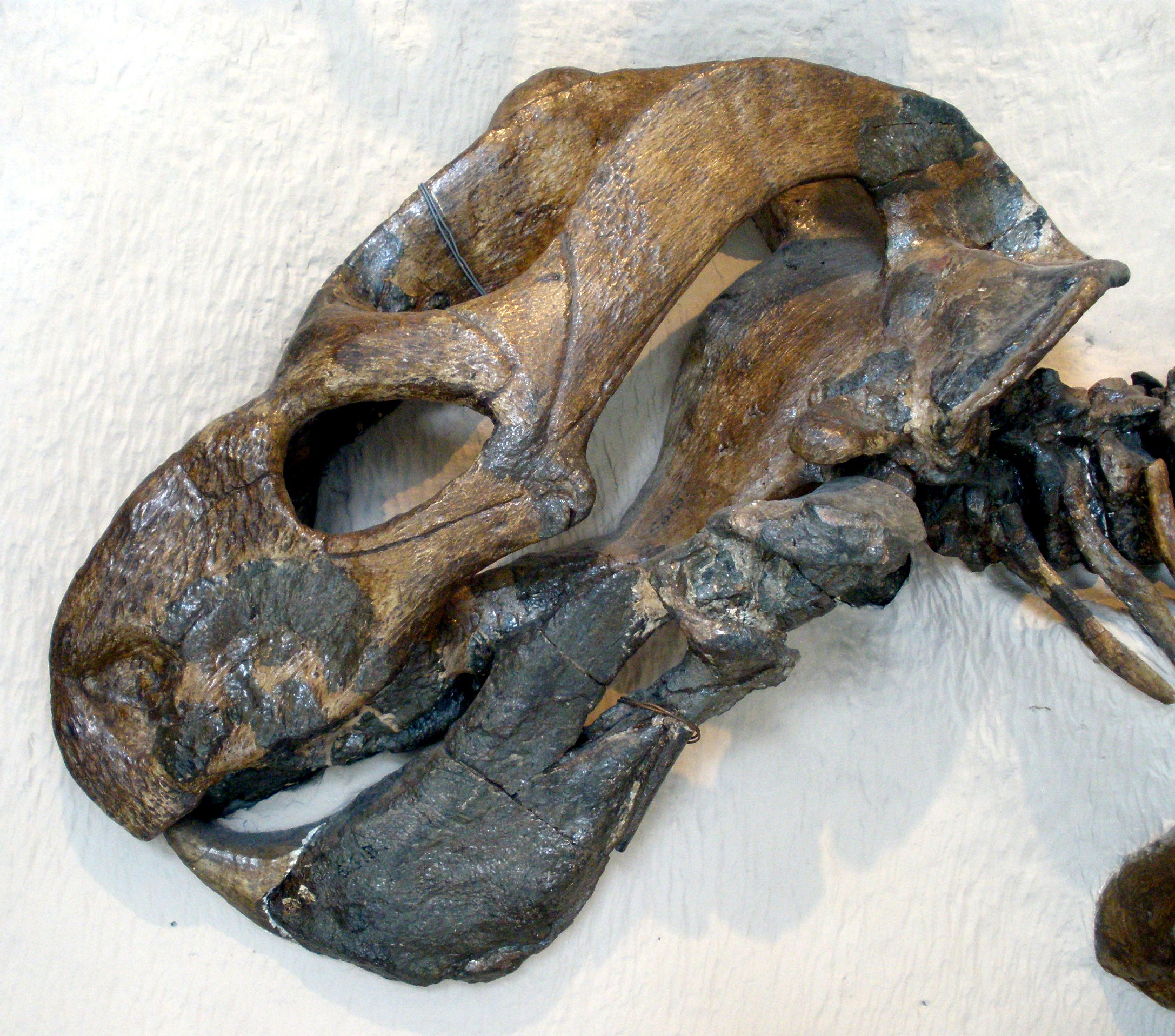
Reconstructed skull of E. bathystoma specimen AMNH 5613

The skull of Endothiodon is most quickly recognized by the prominent upturned beak. The premaxilla and palate of the upper jaw are vaulted and allows for the upturned and pointed lower jaw to fit into this region. On the lower jaw, lateral to the teeth, is a broad groove. Endothiodon lacks a lateral dentary shelf but has a bulbous swelling of the dentary. The function of this swelling is not yet known. The pineal foramen (opening for the "third eye") is situated on a boss, which is high in three of the species and low in one of them (E. mahalanobisi). There is also a boss situated on the ventral margin of the jugal. The anteroventral process is an anteroposteriorly short triangular bone, while in most other dicynodonts it is long and pointed.

=== Teeth ===
The teeth in the upper and lower jaw differ both in morphology as well as in tooth replacement. The teeth of the upper jaw tend to be larger (5–9 millimetres (0.20–0.35 in)) than those of the lower jaw (<5 millimetres (0.20 in)) and are serrated on the anterior edge while the lower jaw has serrations on the posterior edge. Although it was originally thought that E. bathystoma had several rows of teeth on the upper jaw, it was later discovered that the tips of the teeth from the lower jaw had been left behind in the upper jaw. Now it is known that the upper teeth are roughly positioned into a single row. The entire row is moved posteriorly so that the anterior portion of the premaxilla contains no teeth but the most posterior portion still holds two teeth. The teeth are also situated internally to the edge of the maxilla.

It was first thought that the dentary contained three parallel rows of teeth. Instead of arranging the teeth in longitudinal rows, they are now known to fall into obliquely arranged Zahnreihen. In each Zahnreihe, the anteriormost tooth is the oldest and the posterior most tooth is the youngest. There is active ongoing replacement of these tooth rows. The distal portion of each tooth is compressed from side to side and is somewhat pear shaped in cross section. Teeth migrated labially throughout ontogeny rather than being resorbed as rows of new teeth developed.

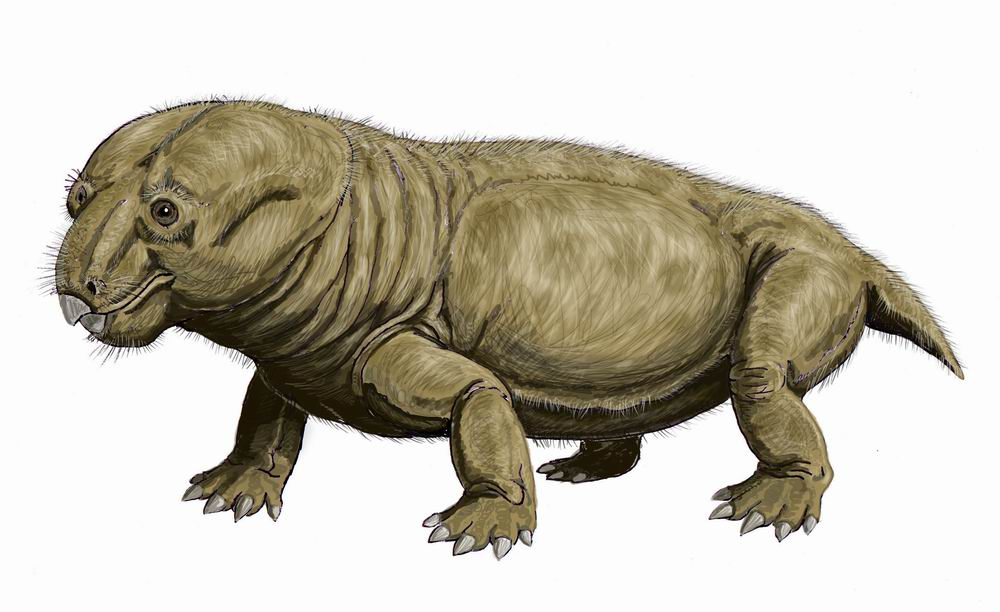
Restoration of E. bathystoma

The palate shows two distinct regions that are covered in minute foramina. These areas probably had a horny covering in life. The broad groove running along the tooth row on the dentary was probably also covered by a horny layer. It is possible that these regions allowed for occlusion where the upper teeth met the groove lateral to the lower teeth and the lower teeth met one of the regions of the palatine. This is still under scrutiny as the palatine region is short in comparison to the lower tooth row and the second horn covered area on the palatine does not oppose any structure in the lower jaw. Because the palatine region is shortened, effective occlusion for shearing would only be possible when the lower jaw was in a retracted position.

== History of discovery ==
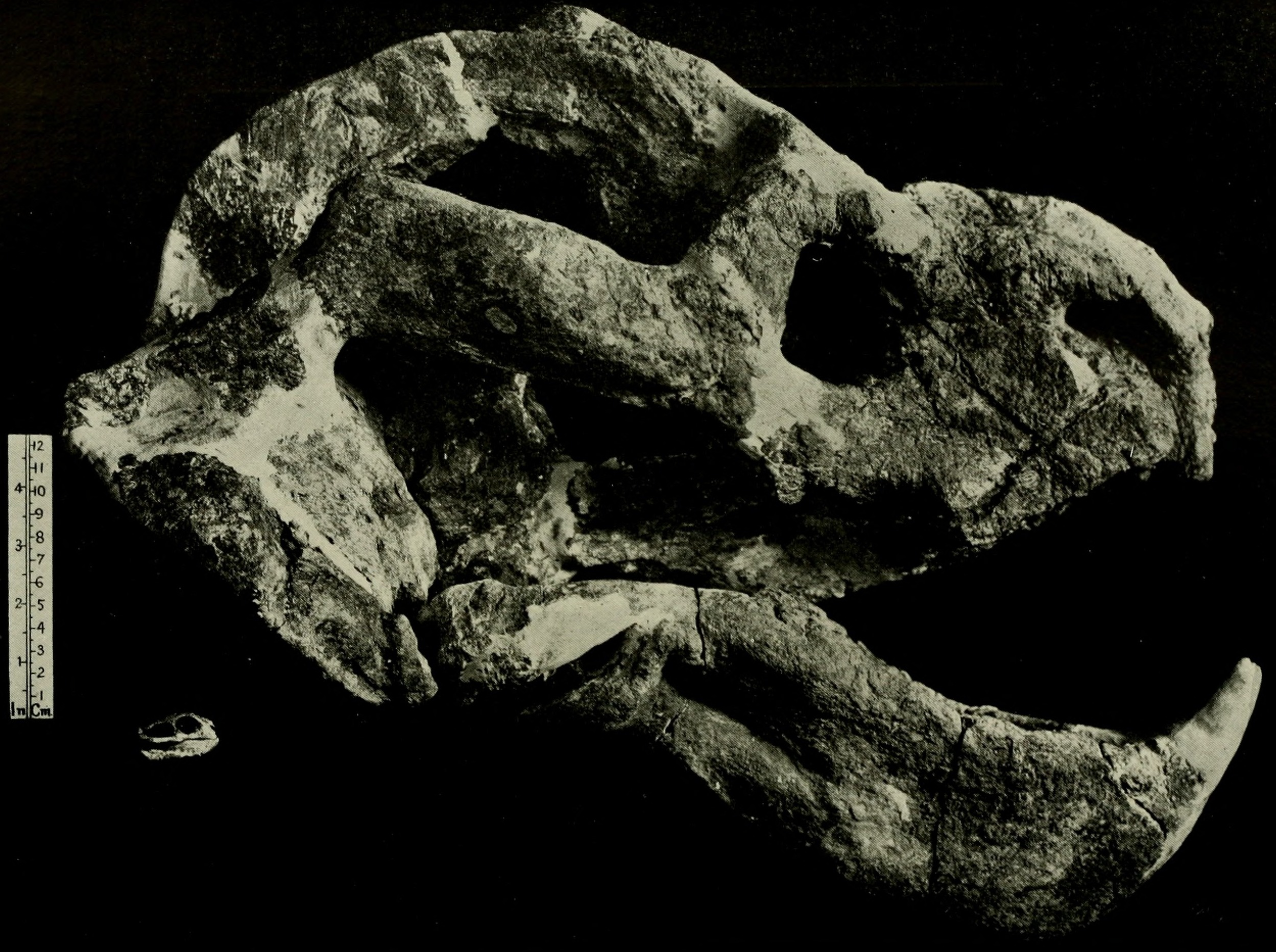
Endothiodon (large) and Emydops (bottom left) skulls

Endothiodon was first described by Richard Owen in 1876 from fossils discovered in the Karoo region of Beaufort Group, South Africa based on a skull and mandible. The genus was described based on the anterior portion of a snout and the corresponding part of the dentary, creating an upturned beak. Several more specimens have since been collected, many of them in the Beaufort Group in South Africa, it is here that the first partial skeleton was discovered by Broom in 1915. In the 1970s a badly weathered dicynodont skull and lower jaw was discovered in Brazil and was preliminarly assigned to Endothiodon. Boos later reexamined the specimen and confirmed this assignment, referring the specimen to Endothiodon (later confirmed as E. bathystoma by Maharaj and colleagues in 2024) and marking Endothiodon as the first Permian dicynodont to be found in South America.

Four main endothiodont genera, Endothiodon, Esoterodon, Endogomphodon, and Emydochampsa, were variably utilised and separated under the subfamily Endothiodontinae. Often these genera were based on species originally assigned to Endothiodon, e.g. Endothiodon uniseries, originally named by Owen in 1879, was made the type species of the genus Esoterodon by Seeley in 1894. In 1964, Cox comprehensively revised the taxonomy of endothiodonts and found that the characteristics used to separate the four genera were not valid. The four genera were thus synonymised under Endothiodon. From the original nine South African species attributable to Endothiodon, Cox was also able to narrow down just three species based on skull size and robustness of the lower jaw. However, Cox stated this arrangement was provisional, and diagnoses for each species were still inadequate to rule out the three species representing a growth series instead.

Since Cox's 1964 revision, another new species of Endothiodon was discovered in India and named E. mahalanobisi in 2000, the first species recognised outside of Africa. Compared to the other three species, it had a smaller inferred adult size, only a single low longitudinal ridge on the snout, a more elongated pineal foramen situated on a low boss located midway on the intertemporal bar in front of instead of surrounding the pineal foramen, and a slender dentary symphysis. Some of these characteristics such as the shape of the pineal foramen and the presence of three longitudinal ridges were thought to be distinguishing characteristics of the genera as a whole, but are now only valid at specific level. Another new species was collected in Tanzania in 1963 and was described in 2015 as E. tolani. It is distinguished from other Endothiodon based on the lack of a pineal boss and the presence of a pair of tusks lateral to the tooth row. Cox's suggestion that E. uniseries and E. whaitsi were likely synonymous with E. bathystoma was supported by researchers in the 21st century, and were provisionally treated as such. In 2024, the taxonomy of Endothiodon was thoroughly revised again by Iyra Maharaj, and formally argued for the three-species concept of Endothiodon including only E. bathystoma, E. mahalanobisi, and E. tolani.

== Phylogeny ==
Endothiodon as a genus has been included in many phylogenetic analyses of dicynodonts, although often represented by only one or two species, typically E. bathystoma. The cladogram below shows and simplifies the results of Angielczyk et al. (2017) to highlight the phylogenetic relationships of the genus Endothiodon relative to other dicynodont species and clades:

- Dicynodontia
  - "Eodicynodon" oelofseni (Note: Assigned to its own genus Nyaphulia in 2024.)
  - - Eodicynodon
    - - Colobodectes
      - - Lanthanostegus
        - - Pylaecephalidae
            - - Eosimops
              - Robertia
            - - Diictodon
              - Prosictodon
          - - Pristerodon
            - - Brachyprosopus
              - - Pristerodon
                - - Endothiodontia
                    - Niassodon
                    - - Abajudon
                      - Endothiodon
                  - Therochelonia
                    - Emydopoidea
                    - Bidentalia

The intrarelationships of Endothiodon were phylogenetically tested for the first time in 2024 by Maharaj and colleagues in 2024 using a specimen-level analysis of individual specimens assigned to E. bathystoma, E. mahalanobisi, E. tolani and E. uniseries. Their results found consistent clades corresponding to the first three species, whilst specimens assigned to E. uniseries were spread within E. bathystoma, supporting their synonymy. A simplified cladogram from Maharaj et al. (2024) following their proposed taxonomy is presented below, showing the relationships of Endothiodon species:

- - Patranomodon
  - unnamed
    - Diictodon
    - unnamed
      - Niassodon
      - unnamed
        - Abajudon
        - Endothiodon
          - E. mahalanobisi
          - - E. tolani
            - E. bathystoma

== Palaeobiology ==
=== Diet ===
In adult Endothiodons the lower jaw teeth are pear shaped in cross section, compressed distolaterally, and has posterior serrated edges while the upper jaw teeth have anterior serrated edges. In the juveniles, the lower jaw is a lot smaller and more slender. The lower jaw contains one functional tooth row with 5-6 teeth. The teeth are small, conical, and pointed. The distal edge contains serrations that are just starting to appear. The juvenile teeth are much simpler and are more similar to that of a carnivore than an herbivore. It is possible that the different tooth morphology might be due to a change in diet from insectivorous or omnivorous as a juvenile to herbivorous as an adult. This would be achieved as size increases and it is more able to adapt to being herbivorous.

== Palaeoecology ==
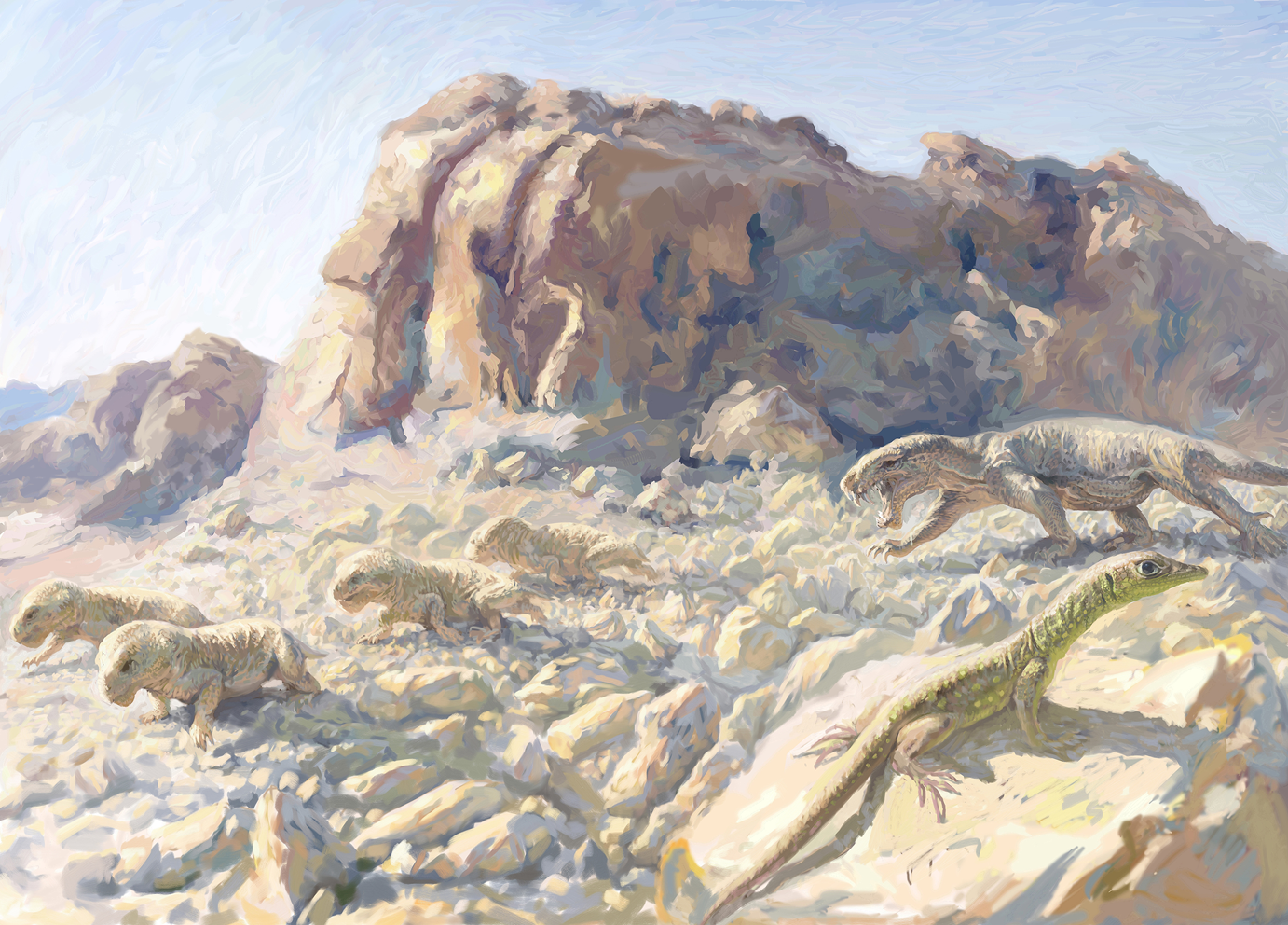
Reconstruction of the Late Permian of Tanzania, with a herd of Endothiodon being pursued by a gorgonopsian

Endothiodon was first discovered in the Karoo region of Beaufort West, South Africa. The Karoo region is characteristic of siltstones that are fine-to medium- or coarse-grained, dark or greenish grey, and very finely crossbedded. Since then several more specimens have been found in African countries including the Usili, Ruhuhu and lower part of the Kawinga Formations of Tanzania, the basal beds of Madumabisa Mudstone of Zambia, and Chiweta Beds, Malawi. Endothiodon has been placed in the Endothiodon and/or Cistecephalus Assemblage Zones and dates back to a Late Permian (Tatarian) age. In 1997 the first specimen of E. mahalanobisi was found in the Kundaram Formation in the north-western part of Pranhita-Godavari valley near Golet in Adilabad district, Andhra Pradesh, India. The Kundaram Formation is characterized by mudstone, sandstone, and ferruginous shale. In addition to Africa and India, Endothiodon is also known from the Morro Pelado Member of Rio do Rasto Formation in the Paraná Basin, Brazil.

A taphonomic reconstruction of the Late Permian showed that there were well established, dense, riverine vegetation. It was originally thought that Endothiodon would grub matter out of the ground using its beak. This is now seen as implausible because of the position of the external nares on the snout being placed so far anteriorly. Instead, it is now thought that Endothiodon inhabited the dense riverine vegetation and would crop foliage with its beak before processing it with its specialized and extensive oral cavity. δ^{18}O and δ^{13}C values reveal that E. bathystoma fed on riverine vegetation, as well as that juveniles of the species incorporated insects into their diet.

== See also ==
- List of therapsids
