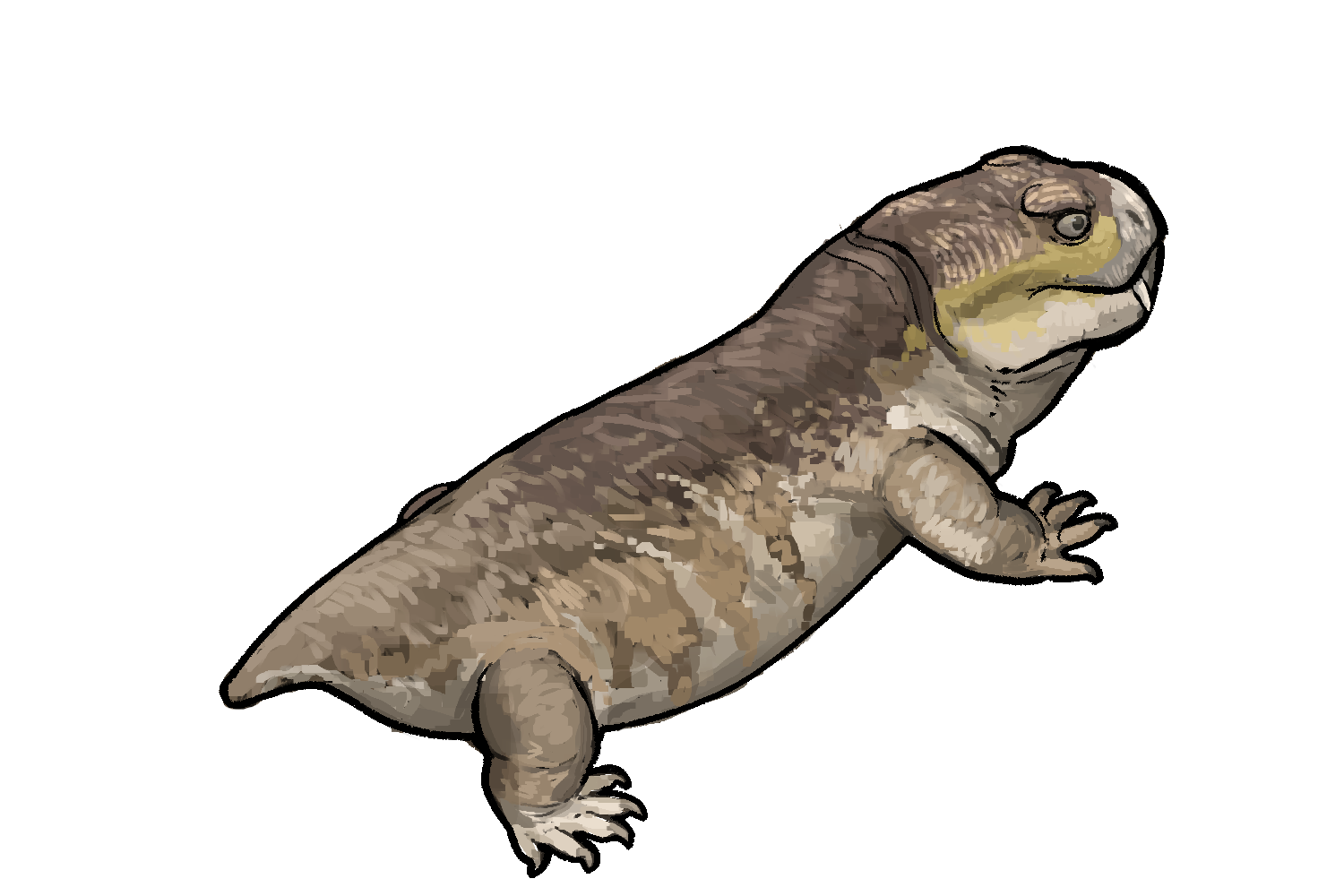
- Life Restoration

Scientific classification
- Kingdom: Animalia
- Phylum: Chordata
- Clade: Synapsida
- Clade: Therapsida
- Clade: †Anomodontia
- Clade: †Dicynodontia
- Genus: †Brachyprosopus; Olson, 1937

Type species
- Brachyprosopus broomi Olson, 1937

Synonyms
- Chelydontops altidentalis Cluver, 1975

= Brachyprosopus =

Brachyprosopus Temporal range: Middle Permian, 270–265 Ma

Extinct genus of dicynodonts

Brachyprosopus is an extinct genus of dicynodont therapsid from the middle Permian Tapinocephalus Assemblage Zone in the Abrahamskraal Formation belonging to the Beaufort Group of the Karoo Basin, South Africa.

Chelydontops Cluver, 1975, based on a skull from the Karoo Basin of South Africa, is a junior synonym.

== Description ==
Brachyprosopus is similar to Endothiodon, Niassodon, and Pristerodon in having absence of anterior median palatal ridges; maxillary tooth rows bounded laterally by a shelf; unfused vomers; raised margins of the interpterygoid vacuity; broad intertemporal region; pineal boss; dentary tables; and a long, wide posterior dentary sulcus that extends posterior to the dentary teeth. However, it can be distinguished by the autapomorphy of a curled lateral edge of the squamosal that forms a lateral wall of the external adductor fossa.

== See also ==
- List of therapsids
