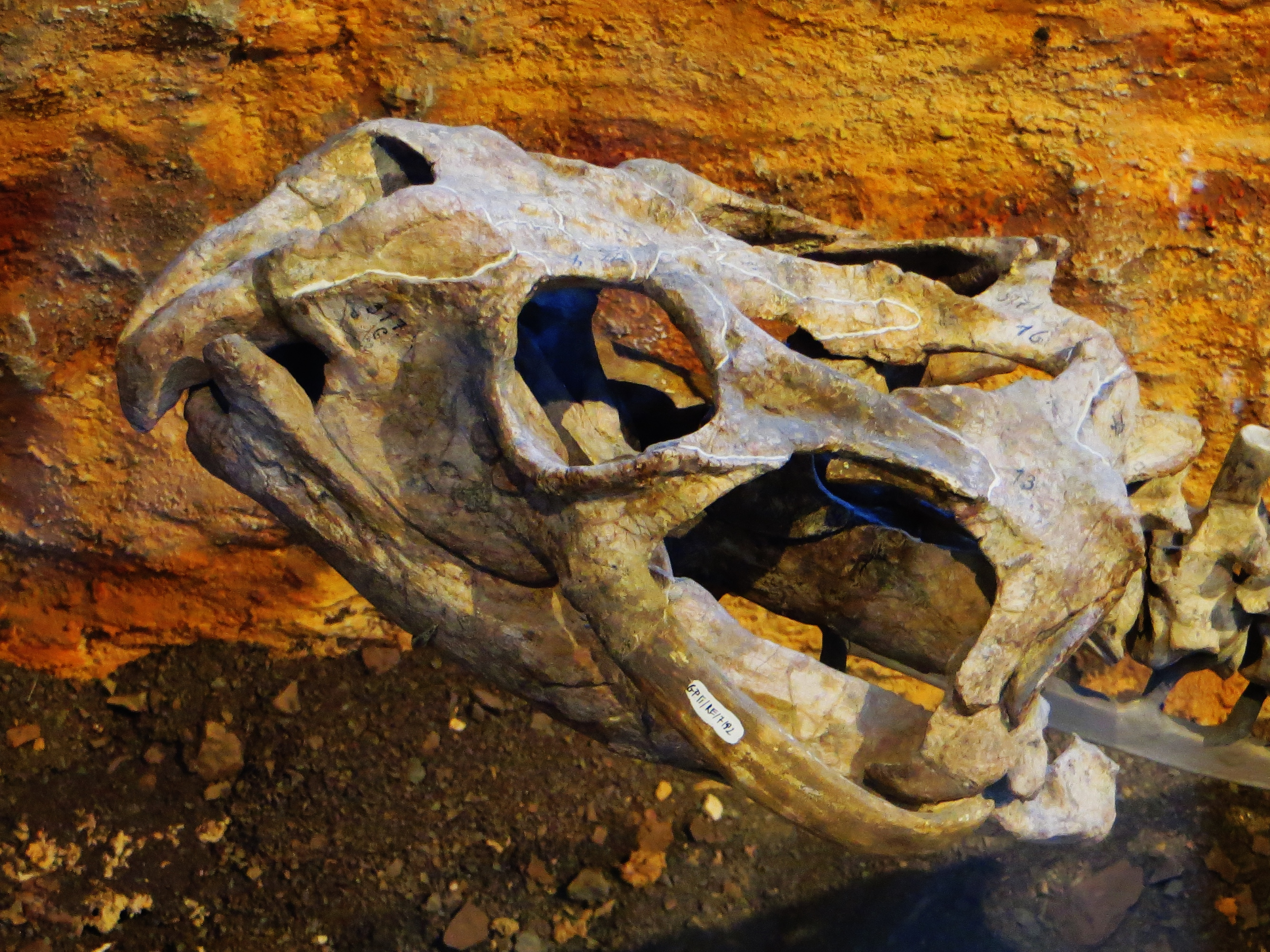
- Stenaulorhynchus stockleyi on display at the Museum of Paleontology, Tübingen

Scientific classification
- Kingdom: Animalia
- Phylum: Chordata
- Class: Reptilia
- Order: †Rhynchosauria
- Family: †Rhynchosauridae
- Subfamily: †Stenaulorhynchinae
- Genus: †Stenaulorhynchus; Haughton, 1932

Species
- †S. stockleyi Haughton, 1932 (type)

= Stenaulorhynchus =

Stenaulorhynchus Temporal range: Anisian ~247–242 Ma

Extinct genus of reptiles

Stenaulorhynchus (possibly meaning "narrow tube beak") is an extinct genus of hyperodapedontid rhynchosaur known from the Middle Triassic (late Anisian stage) deposits of Tanganyika Territory, Tanzania. It was found in the Lifua Member of the Manda Formation in the Karoo Supergroup. It was named and first described by Sidney Henry Haughton in 1932. The type species is Stenaulorhynchus stockleyi, a beaked herbivore measuring over 1 meter in length.

== Description ==
=== Dentition ===
The teeth of Stenaulorhynchus were conical, pointed, and composed mostly of dentine, although new unworn teeth may have had a thin layer of enamel. They were set deeply into and fused with the jaw bones. They are arranged with two-to-several rows of teeth on top and only a few on bottom. The middle row of maxillary teeth only occupied the posterior third of the jaw while the other rows extended all the way forwards and sometimes down the crest of the jaw. The teeth at the front of the mouth, by the beak, were smaller with larger teeth in the middle portion of the jaw. The lower teeth included one raised row of buccal teeth and several rows running diagonally on the medial and lingual portions. The teeth continued to grow throughout the animals life but, unlike with reptiles, the new teeth formed at the back of the tooth row. That happened within the groove on the surface of the lower jaw and three grooves on the maxilla. The lateral As they grew in, the teeth moved forward in the jaw through a combination of growth and remodeling. Instead of occluding their teeth together, Stenaulorhynchus had teeth that occluded against bone, which would wear the teeth down. Over time, the surfaces of the jaw bones would erode as well, causing the maxillary grooves to become shallower and more rounded.

=== Cranial ===
Some of the cranial features of Stenaulorhynchus include a frontal bone that is broader than it is long, the presence of a pineal foramen and a lack of ornamentation on the jugal bone. Their postorbital The occipital condyles are significantly anterior to the quadrates and the quadrate and articular fit tightly together to form a jaw joint that wouldn't have allowed for much rotation. They are also known for their beak, formed at the front of their upper and lower jaws.

=== Postcranial ===
The dorsal vertebrae have a centrum that is taller than it is wide and slightly amphicoelous in shape. The parapophyses and prezygapophyses are distinct that have articular surfaces about 30 degrees above horizontal. The caudal vertebrae have tall neural spines and the second cervical rib has a backwards pointing spine. Their ischium fans out towards the rear of the animal.

The humerus is robust. At the proximal end, the shaft is bent backwards and expanded along the coronal plane. The distal humerus has a flat posterior surface and a curved ectepicondylar groove. The radius and ulna are the same length.

The femur is circular in cross-section and, as with the humerus, the proximal end is bent backwards. Both ends of the femur are expanded and the proximal end has no neck and a prominent greater trochanter. The distal end has thickened condyles with a groove on the lateral side.

== Paleobiology ==
Microscopic analysis of thin-sections of bone have shown that Stenaulorhynchus had a determinant growth pattern, reaching 2/3 of their adult size within one year. The rate of bone deposition in the tibia and femur were 7-10 times higher within that year than in years 2-5. After 5 years of age, less than 1 micron of bone a day was deposited. It would have grown slower than archosauriformes, the South American rhynchosaur species, saurischian dinosaurs, and birds. Stenaulorhynchus continued to grow teeth throughout its life. Juveniles started out with three rows of upper teeth, with only one lateral to the main groove running along the upper surface of the maxilla. By the time they were adults, Stenaulorhynchus had several rows of maxillary teeth, one or more of which were lateral to the main maxillary groove. Older teeth would wear down with use and be resorbed where they contacted other teeth.

Stenaulorhynchus may have been adapted for scratch-digging.

== Discovery ==
The fossils were collected in 1930 by the British geologist G. M. Stockley during a survey commissioned by the Tanganyika Geological Survey Department. The goal was to better understand the "economic possibilities" of the Ruhaha Basin within Tanganyika Territory. He primarily collected fossils that had weathered out of the rock on the surface. The fossil collection was then described by Sidney Henry Haughton. While Stenaulorhynchus is the dominant vertebrate in the Manda beds, they also included a Dicynodont and vertebrae from an unidentified Theropod.

The specimens weren't all correctly labeled since bones from different localities fit together. More surprisingly, a coprolite was mislabeled as a maxillary fragment. Haughton also described a species which he named Stenaulorhynchus major, which he said differed primarily in size, based on a distal left and right humerus fragments. Those specimens were later identified as Stagonosuchus nyassicus, a suchian archosaur from the same locality and horizon.

== Classification ==
Stenaulorhynchus shares characteristics with other early rhynchosaurs, including their ankylothecodont dentition (teeth within deep sockets and fused to the bone) and precision-shear bite. They also have double-bladed dentaries and grooves on the upper surface of the maxilla. One of the differences between them is that Stenaulorhynchus had smaller maxillary teeth with a larger gap between the tooth rows. Stenaulorhynchus is differentiated from the later Hyperadapedon by its more lateral eyes, more forward braincase, and longer lower jaw with the teeth located more anteriorly. Hyperadapedons also lack the double-bladed dentary that the early genera have. The only absolute synapomorphy between all the rhynchosaurs is that the dentary is at least half the total length of the jaw.

Stenaulorhynchinae, a subfamily of rhynchosaurs including Stenaulorhynchus, has been proposed. Based on an analysis of morphological characteristics, one study defines it as including all taxa that are more closely related to Stenaulorhynchus stockleyi than Hyperodapedon gordoni. The defining traits include having many teeth on the tongue side of the maxilla and a reduced size of the maxillary occlusal teeth allowing more teeth per row.

Stenaulorhynchus has also been labeled as a sister-taxa to the Brazilian genus Brasinorhynchus which also has three or more tooth rows medial to the main maxillary groove but lacks the centrum contribution to the parapophyses and diaphophyses.

== Geology ==
Stenaulorhynchus is found in the Upper Bone Bed in the Njalili locality, part of the Lifua Member of the Manda Formation. It is composed of proximal floodplain paleosol deposits. Articulated specimens of Stenaulorhynchus have been found, suggesting that they may have mummified before burial. The surface of the bed has been exposed by tributaries eroding away the rock. During the Triassic, the floodplain would have been covered by springs and ponds. Rises in precipitation and mean annual temperature may have led to an increase in perennial vegetation, as well.
