= Myosauroides =

Myosauroides Temporal range: 259–255 Ma

Scientific classification
- Kingdom: Animalia
- Phylum: Chordata
- Clade: Synapsida
- Clade: Therapsida
- Clade: †Anomodontia
- Clade: †Dicynodontia
- Family: †Myosauridae
- Genus: †Myosauroides; Broom, 1941
- Species: †M. minnaari

Binomial name
- †Myosauroides minnaari Broom, 1941

Extinct genus of dicynodonts

Myosauroides is an extinct genus of non-mammalian synapsid. It is found only at Kleinfontein, Graaff-Reinet (Cistecephalus Assemblage Zone).

== See also ==
- List of therapsids
