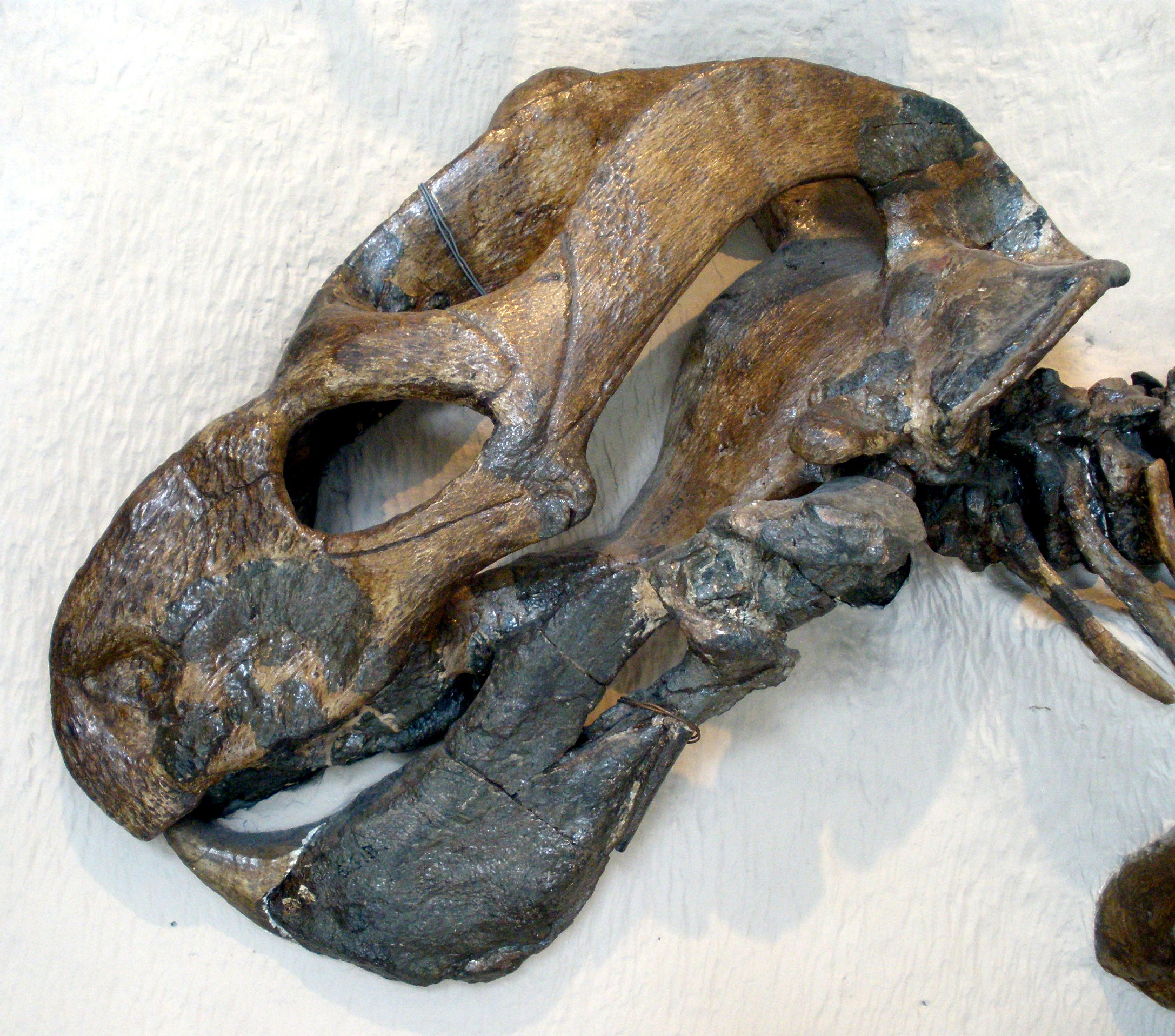
- Skull of Endothiodon bathystoma at the American Museum of Natural History.

Scientific classification
- Kingdom: Animalia
- Phylum: Chordata
- Clade: Synapsida
- Clade: Therapsida
- Clade: †Anomodontia
- Clade: †Dicynodontia
- Clade: †Endothiodontia; Owen, 1876
- Family: †Endothiodontidae; Lydekker, 1889

Genera
- Abajudon; Endothiodon; ?Niassodon

= Endothiodontia =

Endothiodontia Temporal range: Late Permian 265.1–254.17 Ma

Extinct clade of dicynodonts

Endothiodontia is a clade of dicynodont therapsids that includes the family Endothiodontidae and possibly the family Eumantellidae.
