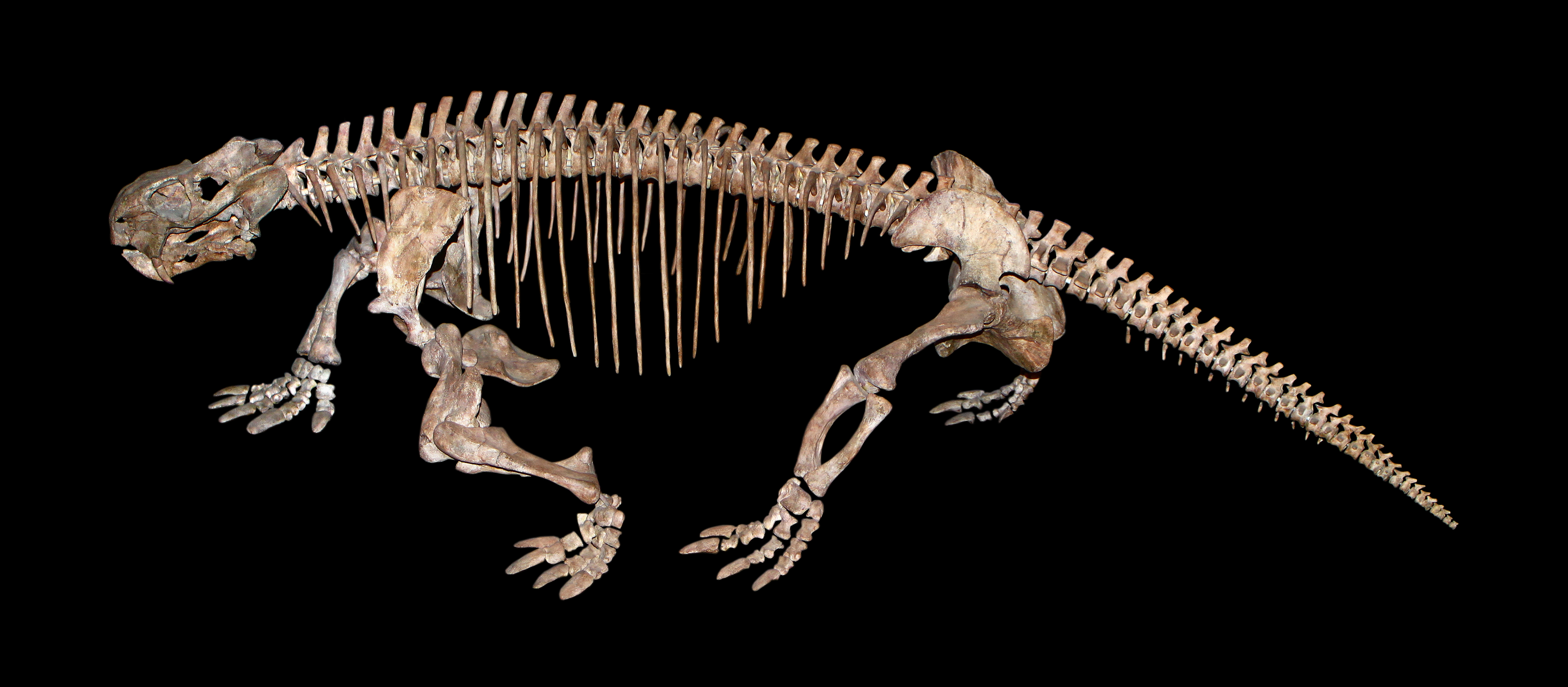

Scientific classification
- Kingdom: Animalia
- Phylum: Chordata
- Clade: Synapsida
- Clade: Therapsida
- Clade: †Anomodontia
- Clade: †Dicynodontia
- Family: †Shansiodontidae
- Genus: †Tetragonias; Cruickshank 1967

Type species
- Tetragonias njalilus (von Huene 1942)

Species
- T. njalilus (von Huene 1942)

Synonyms
- Dicynodon njalilus von Huene 1942

= Tetragonias =

Tetragonias Temporal range: Anisian ~247–242 Ma

Extinct genus of dicynodonts

Tetragonias is an extinct genus of dicynodont from the Anisian Manda Beds of Tanzania. With tetra meaning "four," and goni meaning "angle," the name references the square shape of the Tetragonias skull when viewed dorsally. Not to be confused with the plant Tetragonia, Tetragonias were dicynodont anomodonts discovered in the late 1960s by paleontologist A. R. I. Cruickshank in the Manda Formation. Only the type species, T. njalilus, has been recognized.

Originally thought to have existed during the lower Middle Triassic age, also called the Anisian age, Gay and Cruickshank (1999) later postulated that the Manda Formation may have actually been of the Ladinian age. This terrestrial herbivore was determined to have relation to the genera Lystrosaurus and Kannemeyeria.

== Discovery and historical information ==
Initially described by F. von Huene in 1942 as Dicynodon njalilus, Cruickshank renamed this species Tetragonias njalilus to correctly point out how different the palate and intertemporal bar structures of this Triassic creature were from the other mostly Permian dicynodonts. He mainly aimed to revise the earlier von Huene descriptions of the skull and postcranial skeleton. Cruickshank's contribution to the scientific classification for Tetragonias is what is used today, although, there have been questions as of late concerning the "taxonomic integrity" of Tetragonias due to Cruickshank's misattribution of certain size differences in features to sexual dimorphism as opposed to feeding differences or other taxa.

== Description and paleobiology ==
As for Cruickshank's specific diagnosis, T. njalilus was described as a "medium sized dicynodont, tusked in both sexes" with an overall rectangular skull shape in dorsal view. He included details about the maxillary processes surrounding the tusks differently in males and females, the fact that the postorbital bones do not meet the squamosals at the back of the temporal fenestrae, information about the size of the interpterygoid space in relation to the length of the internal nares, and most significantly, that the intertemporal bar is "drawn out into low parietal crest."

=== Skull ===
T. njalilus skull bones are quite large. One notable feature is the "sharply downturned snout," which inspired the hypothesis of possible relation to the genus Lystrosaurus. However, T. njalilus has much larger temporal fenestrae than Lystrosaurus murrayi, as well as a shallower skull, no postfrontals, a parietal crest, and differences in size of some parts of the palate. The postorbitals don't cover the parietals to the same degree as von Huene had described, and as mentioned before, do not meet the squamosals.

The palatal openings to the internal nares of Triassic dicynodonts are significantly larger than the palatal openings of Permian dicynodonts, which is a consistent pattern that have prompted some have tried to explain using the idea that concentrations of atmospheric oxygen have been gradually declining and contributed to end-Permian extinction.

=== Postcranial skeleton ===
==== Pelvic girdle and locomotion ====
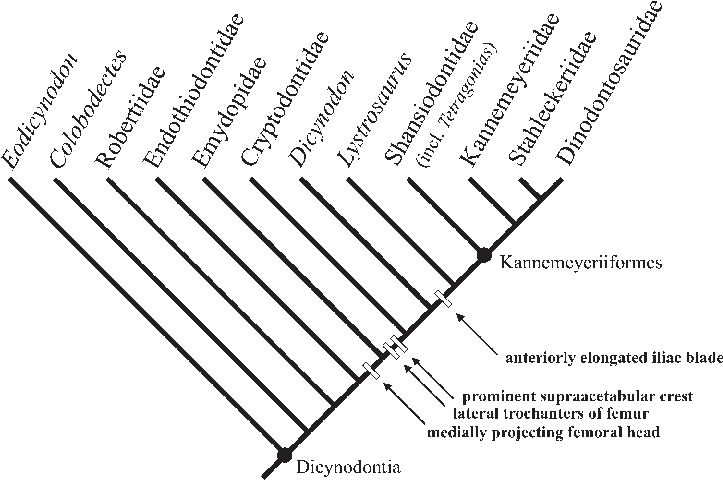
Tetragonias Cladogram

To further expound on the posture of the Tetragonias pelvic girdle, the iliac blade forms a ventromedial angle with the ischium and the pubis. All the pelvic bones in the acetabulum are fused. There is a curvature in the pelvis of Tetragonias that causes the pubis and ischium to extend far medially and ventrally (see Fig. 4 of Fröbisch). This causes the iliac blade to form the major vertical component of the pelvic bone, which contrasts with what Cruickshank's 1967 paper suggests. It appears there was a misinterpretation about the entire pelvis being vertical.

In Tetragonias the straight medial margins of the puboischiadic suggest an articulation which is supported by ligaments or cartilage, although there's no evidence for a suture or fusion along the midline. All pelvic bones in the holotype of T. njalilus at both the left and right sides of the pelvic girdle of are fused. This indicates that movement b/n the pelvic bones of one body side was impossible (in the mature animal). The pelvis is separated into a vertically & a more horizontally oriented part. It possesses an upward-arched backbone, though less pronounced than Cruickshank had postulated.

As mentioned earlier concerning the biomechanical strain on the hind limb, most of Tetragonias's body weight would have been carried by the adducted hind limb rather than pelvis: "In this orientation of the pelvic girdle, the supraacetabular crest is strongly overhanging the acetabulum, forming a well-developed dorsal roof to the laterally pointing articulation surface. This feature emphasizes a direct transmission of the body load from the pelvis to the femur, resulting in a more adducted position of the hind limb." This inhibits Tetragonias from sprawling motion, but rather, a parasaggital gait.

==== Vertebrae ====
Most synapsids possess only 3 sacral vertebrae, which articulate with the ilium and are vital in tetrapod locomotion. According to Griffin et al., "The ancestral synapsid probably possessed two sacral vertebrae (Romer 1956; LeBlanc and Reisz 2014), with Therapsida and some non-therapsid lineages (e.g., Caseidae, Edaphosauridae, Sphenacodontidae) incorporating a third sacral from the caudal series."

Synapsids display very little variation in the number of presacral vertebrae, as their axial column is highly conserved. However, Dicynodontia, including T. njalilus, is an exception, containing a clade of anomodont therapsids with far greater variation in morphology. These amonodonts can possess up to seven or even more sacral vertebrae, which is quite the deviation from its therapsid relatives. This is likely attributable to the trend of growing body size observed throughout dicynodont evolutionary history, which positively correlates with an increase in sacral vertebrae number. This has also led to a wide-ranging variety of body sizes. These sacral vertebrae are used as a key identifying feature in Tetragonias phylogeny.

Researchers hypothesize that dicynodonts that increased their number of sacral vertebrae from three to four achieved this by adding a novel fourth vertebrae anteriorly to the other three, which make up the plesiomorphic sacrum. (Griffin) As for taxa with more than four sacral vertebrae, they essentially follow the same body plan in that there are "three plesiomorphic sacrals...in addition to one or more novel vertebrae...(see Figs. 1, 2)...Taken together, our observations indicate that all dicynodonts with a given sacral count appear to possess identically constructed sacra...Most novel sacral vertebrae are added anteriorly to the plesiomorphic sacrum in dicynodonts, with only one vertebra added posteriorly."

==== Other features ====
The basicranium of most Triassic dicynodonts shortens compared to those of the Permian. However, Tetragonias and a few other genera actually maintain the same basicranial length as Permian dicynodonts.

== Geological and paleoenvironmental information ==
The Manda Formation, also known as Manda Beds, is a geological formation located in the southern region of Tanzania in the Ruhuhu Basin. The formation is made primarily of sandstone but also consists of siltstone and mudstone.

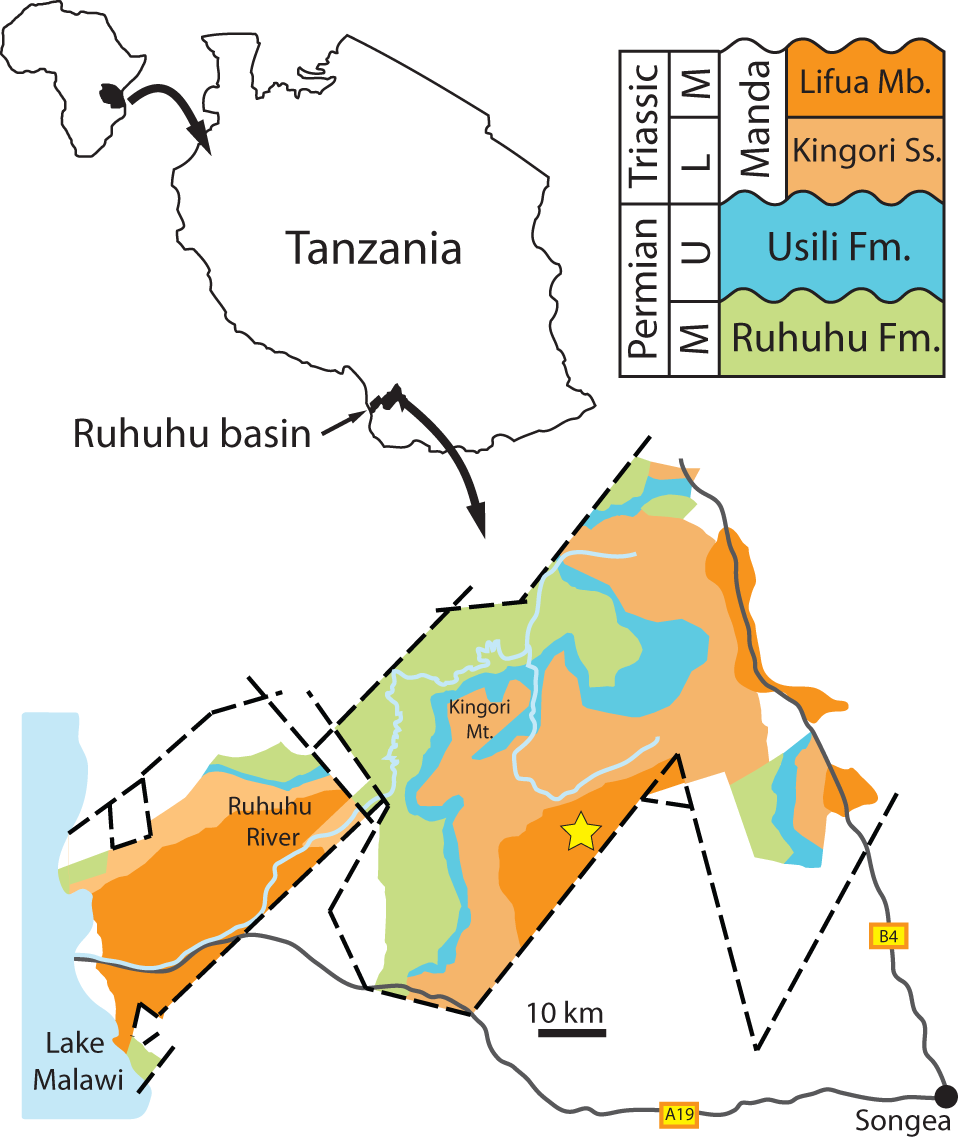
Manda Formation, Tanzania

At the time of his 1967 publishing, Cruickshank hypothesized that the Manda Formation was of the Middle Triassic age and also made mention that some parts of the Manda Beds were understood to be the stratigraphic equivalent of the Molteno Beds of South Africa. This latter piece of information was due to the fact that Kannemeyeria latifrons, which existed during the Lower Triassic Cynognathus-zone, occurred in both formations.
