= Golleti =

Goleti
- Census Town
- Location in Telangana, India Goleti (India)
- Coordinates: 19.071556°N 79.491173°E
- Country: India
- State: Telangana
- District: Adilabad

Area
  - Total: 13.28 km^{2} (5.13 sq mi)

Population (2011)
  - Total: 5,133
  - Density: 386.5/km^{2} (1,001/sq mi)

Languages
  - Official: Telugu Gond Marati
- Time zone: UTC+5:30 (IST)
- PIN: 504292
- Vehicle registration: TS
- Website: telangana.gov.in

Goleti is a census town located near to Rebbana mandal in Adilabad District of the Indian state of Telangana.
