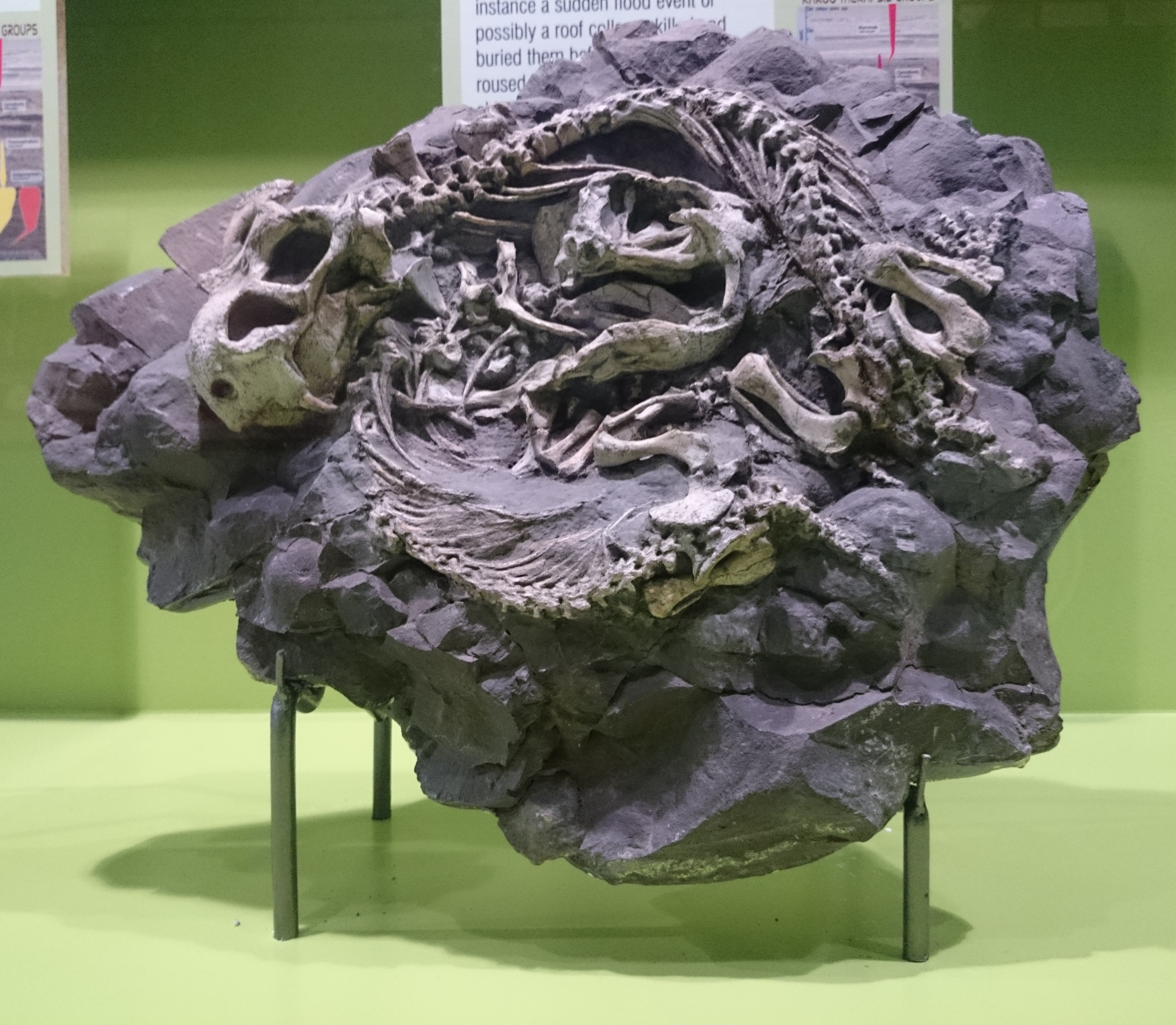
- Skeleton of Diictodon
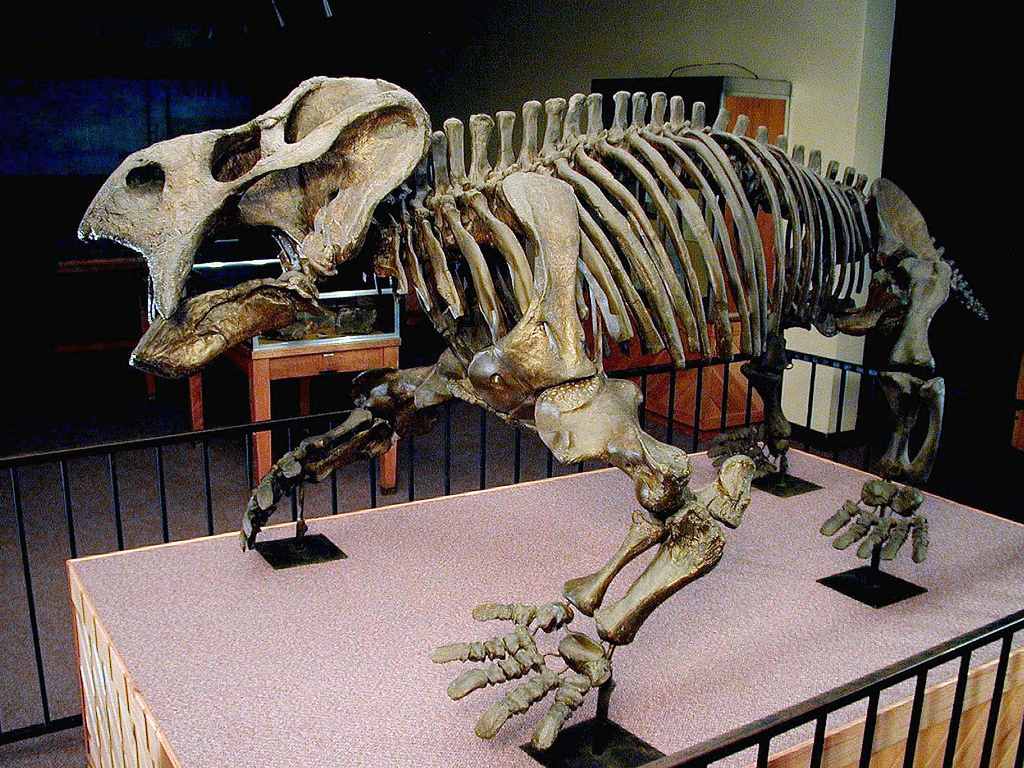
- Skeleton of Placerias

Scientific classification
- Kingdom: Animalia
- Phylum: Chordata
- Clade: Synapsida
- Clade: Therapsida
- Clade: †Anomodontia
- Clade: †Chainosauria
- Clade: †Dicynodontia; Owen, 1859

Subgroups
- †Brachyprosopus; †Colobodectes; †Eodicynodon; †Lanthanostegus; †Nyaphulia; †Endothiodontia; †Eumantellidae; †Pylaecephalidae; †Therochelonia

Synonyms
- Dicynodonta

= Dicynodontia =

Dicynodontia Temporal range: Middle Permian (Wordian) to Late Triassic (late Norian or Rhaetian) 268–211 Ma

Extinct clade of therapsids

Dicynodontia is an extinct clade of anomodonts, an extinct type of non-mammalian therapsid. Dicynodonts were herbivores that typically bore a pair of tusks, hence their name, which means 'two dog tooth'. Members of the group possessed a horny, typically toothless beak, unique amongst all synapsids. Dicynodonts first appeared in Southern Pangaea during the mid-Permian, ca. 270–260 million years ago, and became globally distributed and the dominant herbivorous animals in the Late Permian, ca. 260–252 Mya. They were devastated by the end-Permian mass extinction that wiped out most other therapsids ca. 252 Mya. They rebounded at beginning of the following Triassic, but subsequently declined during the Late Triassic and died out towards the end of that period. They were the most successful and diverse of the non-mammalian therapsids, with over 80–90 genera known, varying from rat-sized burrowers to elephant-sized megaherbivores.

== Characteristics ==
Skeleton of Lystrosaurus

The dicynodont skull is highly specialised, light but strong, with the synapsid temporal openings at the rear of the skull greatly enlarged to accommodate larger jaw muscles. The front of the skull and the lower jaw are generally narrow and, in all but a number of primitive forms, toothless. Instead, the front of the mouth was equipped with a keratinous horny beak, as in turtles and ceratopsian dinosaurs. Food was processed by the retraction of the lower jaw when the mouth closed, producing a powerful shearing action, which would have enabled dicynodonts to cope with tough plant material. Dicynodonts typically had a pair of enlarged maxillary caniniform teeth, analogous to the tusks present in some living mammals. In the earliest genera, they were merely enlarged teeth, but in later forms they independently evolved into ever-growing teeth like mammal tusks multiple times. In some dicynodonts, the presence of tusks has been suggested to be sexually dimorphic. Some dicynodonts such as Stahleckeria lacked true tusks and instead bore tusk-like extensions on the side of the beak. Like some other anomodonts, the skull roof shows the development of a novel skull bone, the "preparietal" that is not found in earlier synapsids nor in the cynodont ancestors of mammals. It is unpaired and forms the anterior (forward) margin of the pineal foramen. Similar bones, also called "preparietals" are found in gorgonopsid and biarmosuchian therapsids, though these are thought to have evolved convergently in each group. Dicynodonts ancestrally had three vertebrae in the sacrum, though this rose to over 6 vertebrae in some dicynodonts as a result of both vertebrae duplication and incorporation of caudal vertebrae into the sacrum.

Dicynodonts vary enormously in size. The smallest were rat-sized, a size common amongst Permian members of the group, while Triassic members of the group were typically much larger, with the youngest known member Lisowicia also being the largest known, around the size of an elephant, with a body mass estimated at 5,880 kilograms (12,960 lb). Many at least Triassic dicynodonts may have held their hindlimbs in a relatively erect posture while having more splayed forelimbs, though Lisowicia likely to have had erect forelimbs as well.

=== Soft tissue anatomy ===
Mummified foot of Lystrosaurus from the Karoo of South Africa, showing warty skin texture

Possible hair remnants in Permian carnivore coprolites have been suggested to have possibly been from dicynodonts, as digested dicynodont bones are abundant in the coprolites. However specimens of Lystrosaurus fossilized with mummified skin have found that the skin surface was covered in numerous overlapping tubercules. Pentasauropus dicynodont tracks suggest that dicynodonts had fleshy pads on their feet.

=== Possible endothermy ===
Dicynodonts have long been suspected of being warm-blooded animals. Their bones are highly vascularised and possess Haversian canals, and their bodily proportions are conducive to heat preservation. In young specimens, the bones are so highly vascularised that they exhibit higher channel densities than most other therapsids. Yet, studies on Late Triassic dicynodont coprolites paradoxically showcase digestive patterns more typical of animals with slow metabolisms. A 2017 study using chemical analysis suggested that cynodonts and dicynodonts both developed warm blood independently before the Permian extinction.

=== Reproduction and social behaviour ===
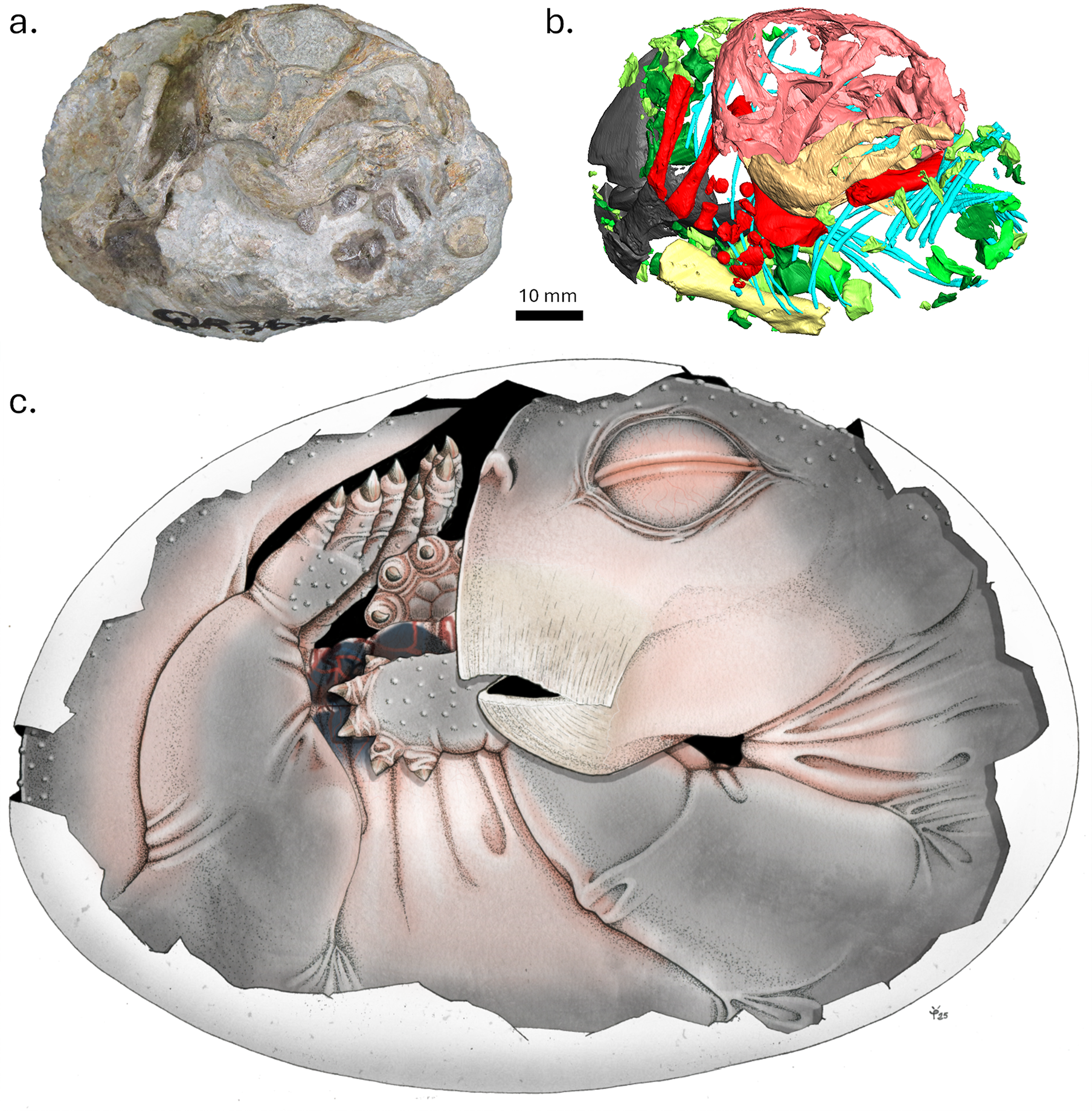
Preserved embryo of dicynodont Lystrosaurus from the Early Triassic of South Africa, with life restoration showing embryo curled up in inferred (but unpreserved) egg

A preserved tightly curled embryonic individual of Lystrosaurus from the Early Triassic of South Africa suggests that dicynodonts laid eggs, as is thought to be ancestral for synapsids and amniotes, though the lack of preserved eggshell suggests that the eggs were probably soft and leathery like in living monotreme mammals, and as is suggested to be ancestral for amniotes. The relatively large size of the eggs suggests individuals of Lystrosaurus were precocial (relatively independent from birth), and the egg had large yolk reserves for development, indicating that dicynodonts did not produce milk like mammals (the eggs of milk-producing monotremes are relatively small compared to body size) and perhaps at least some non-mammalian cynodonts.

Illustration of two Diictodon sleeping communally in a burrow

Fossil communal latrines, preserved trackways showing adults and juvenile dicynodonts walking alongside each other, as well as large fossil aggregations of both adult and juvenile dicynodonts, suggest that at least some dicynodonts engaged in post-hatching parental care and were gregarious.

== History of discovery and research ==
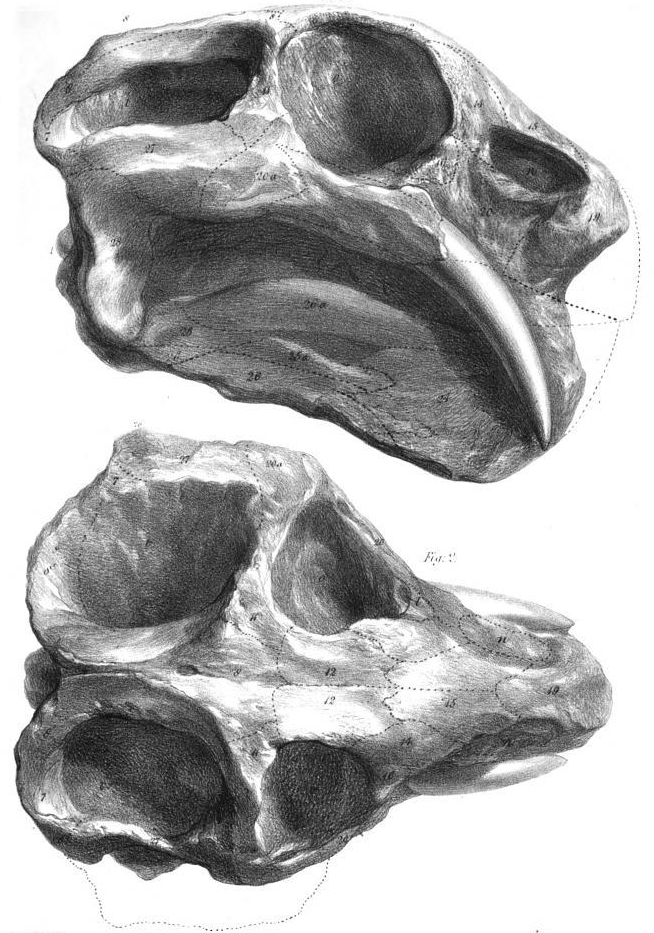
Dicynodon lacerticeps skull illustration, first published in an 1845 description by Sir Richard Owen

A 2024 paper posited that rock art of a superficially walrus-like imaginary creature with downcurved tusks created by the San people of South Africa prior to 1835 may have been partly inspired by fossil dicynodont skulls which erode out of rocks in the area.

Dicynodonts have been known to science since the mid-1800s. The South African geologist Andrew Geddes Bain gave the first description of dicynodonts in 1845. At the time, Bain was a supervisor for the construction of military roads under the Corps of Royal Engineers and had found many reptilian fossils during his surveys of South Africa. Bain described these fossils in an 1845 letter published in Transactions of the Geological Society of London, calling them "bidentals" for their two prominent tusks. In that same year, the English paleontologist Richard Owen named two species of dicynodonts from South Africa: Dicynodon lacerticeps and Dicynodon bainii. Since Bain was preoccupied with the Corps of Royal Engineers, he wanted Owen to describe his fossils more extensively. Owen did not publish a description until 1876 in his Descriptive and Illustrated Catalogue of the Fossil Reptilia of South Africa in the Collection of the British Museum. By this time, many more dicynodonts had been described. In 1859, another important species called Ptychognathus declivis was named from South Africa. In the same year, Owen named the group Dicynodontia. In his Descriptive and Illustrated Catalogue, Owen honored Bain by erecting Bidentalia as a replacement name for his Dicynodontia. The name Bidentalia quickly fell out of use in the following years, replaced by popularity of Owen's Dicynodontia, though Bidentalia is now widely used in modern dicynodont taxonomy as a major subclade of Dicynodontia.

== Evolutionary history ==
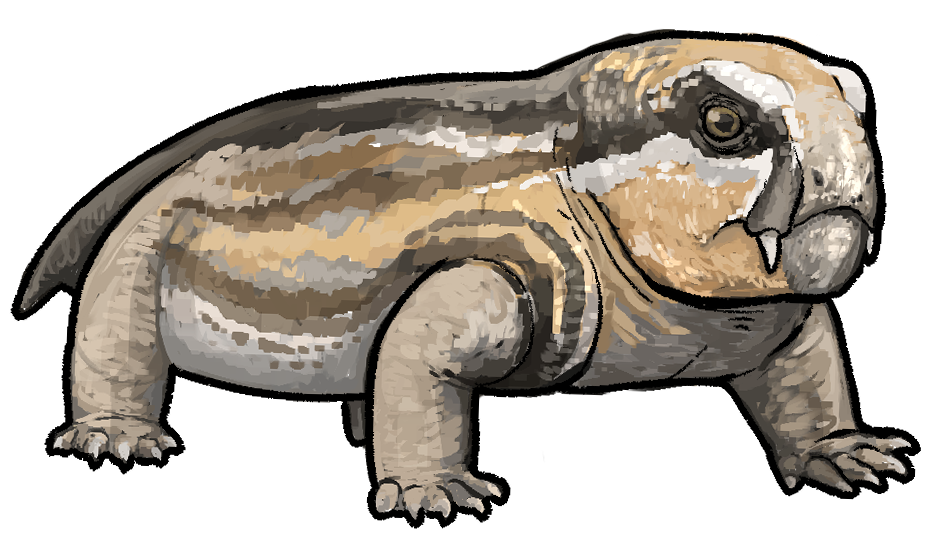
Eodicynodon, a basal dicynodont from middle Permian South Africa.

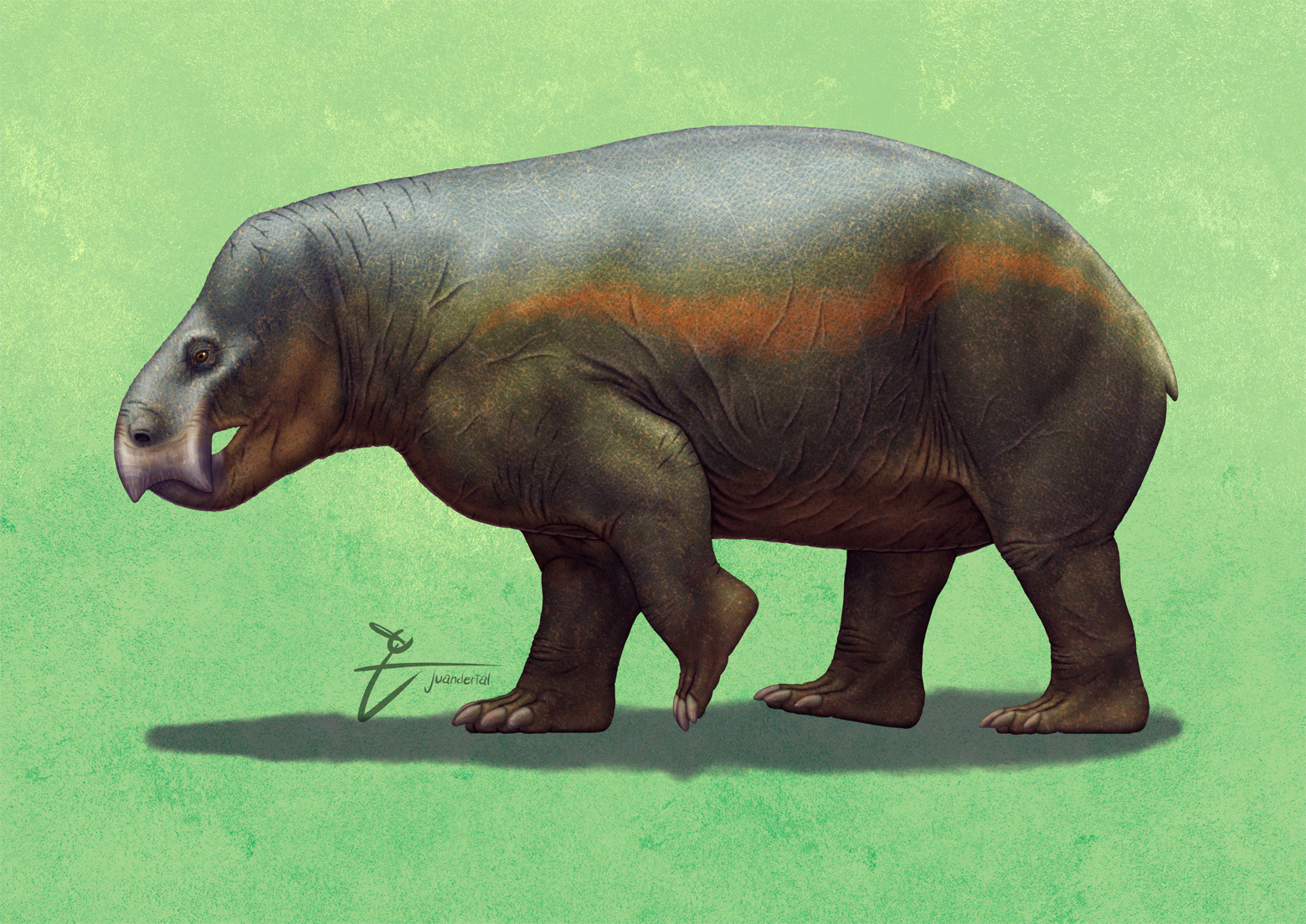
Lisowicia, from Late Triassic Poland

Dicynodonts first appeared during the Middle Permian in the Southern Hemisphere, with South Africa (which heavily dominates the Middle-Late Permian global terrestrial fossil record due to the Karoo Supergroup) being the centre of their known diversity, and underwent a rapid evolutionary radiation, becoming globally distributed and amongst the most successful and abundant land vertebrates during the Late Permian. During this time, they included a large variety of ecotypes, including large, medium-sized, and small herbivores and short-limbed mole-like burrowers.

Dicynodont diversity was decimated by the end-Permian mass extinction (Great Dying), with the vast majority of species going extinct. Only a few dicynodont lineages are known to have survived the Great Dying: these include Myosauridae (Myosaurus) Kingoriidae (Kombuisia), Lystrosauridae (Lystrosaurus) and possibly Counillonia, with Lystrosaurus being the most common and widespread herbivores of the Induan (earliest Triassic). None of these lineages greatly diversified or survived a significant time into the Triassic. The most important dicynodont group to have crossed into the Triassic was the Kannemeyeriiformes, the only dicynodont clade who significantly diversified during the period. Triassic dicynodonts (predomiantly represented by Kannemeyeriiformes) generally show less morphological diversity compared to Permian ones, with the vast majority occupying the niche of medium-large sized herbivores. The stocky, generally pig- to ox-sized Kannemeyeriiformes were successful herbivores worldwide for much of the Triassic period. However during the late Triassic during the Norian and possibly the Carnian, they declined, though the nature and timing of this decline is not well agreed upon. Suggested influencing factors include the Carnian pluvial episode. Fossils of an Asian elephant-sized dicynodont Lisowicia bojani discovered in Poland indicate that dicynodonts survived at least until the late Norian or earliest Rhaetian (latest Triassic, at earliest 211 million years ago, and probably no later than around 205 million years ago); this animal was also the largest known dicynodont species.

Six fragments of fossil bone discovered in Queensland, Australia, were interpreted as remains of a dicynodont skull in 2003. These were taken by some authors to indicate that dicynodonts survived into the Cretaceous in southern Gondwana. The dicynodont affinity of these specimens was questioned (including a proposal that they belonged to a baurusuchian crocodyliform by Agnolin et al. in 2010), and in 2019 Knutsen and Oerlemans considered this fossil to be of Plio-Pleistocene age, and reinterpreted it as a fossil of a large mammal, probably a diprotodontid marsupial.

== Systematics ==
=== Taxonomy ===
Dicynodontia was originally named by the English paleontologist Richard Owen. It was erected as a family of the order Anomodontia and included the genera Dicynodon and Ptychognathus. Other groups of Anomodontia included Gnathodontia, which included Rhynchosaurus (now known to be an archosauromorph) and Cryptodontia, which included Oudenodon. Cryptodonts were distinguished from dicynodonts from their absence of tusks. Although it lacks tusks, Oudenodon is now classified as a dicynodont, and the name Cryptodontia is no longer used. Thomas Henry Huxley revised Owen's Dicynodontia as an order that included Dicynodon and Oudenodon. Dicynodontia was later ranked as a suborder or infraorder with the larger group Anomodontia, which is classified as an order. The ranking of Dicynodontia has varied in recent studies, with Ivakhnenko (2008) considering it a suborder, Ivanchnenko (2008) considering it an infraorder, and Kurkin (2010) considering it an order.

Many higher taxa, including infraorders and families, have been erected as a means of classifying the large number of dicynodont species. Cluver and King (1983) recognised several main groups within Dicynodontia, including Eodicynodontidae (containing only Eodicynodon), Endothiodontia, Pristerodontia (Pristerodontidae, Cryptodontidae, Geikiidae, Dicynodontidae, Lystrosauridae, and Kannemeyeriidae), Kingoriamorpha (containing only Kingoriidae), Diictodontia (Pylaecephalidae, Robertiidae, Cistecephalidae, Emydopidae, and Myosauridae), and Venyukoviamorpha. Most of these taxa are no longer considered valid. Kammerer and Angielczyk (2009) suggested that the problematic taxonomy and nomenclature of Dicynodontia and other groups results from the large number of conflicting studies and the tendency for invalid names to be mistakenly established.

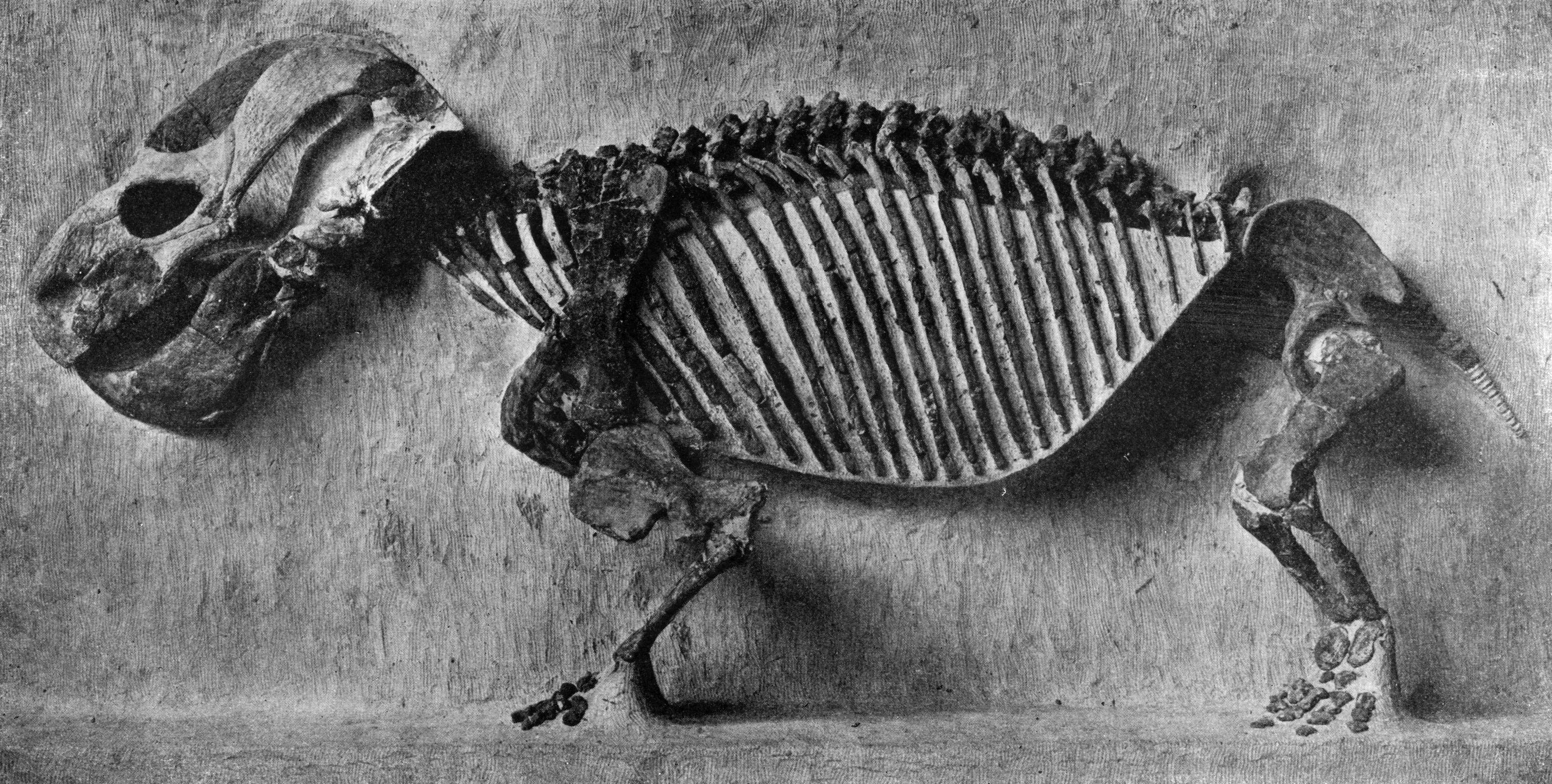
Endothiodon
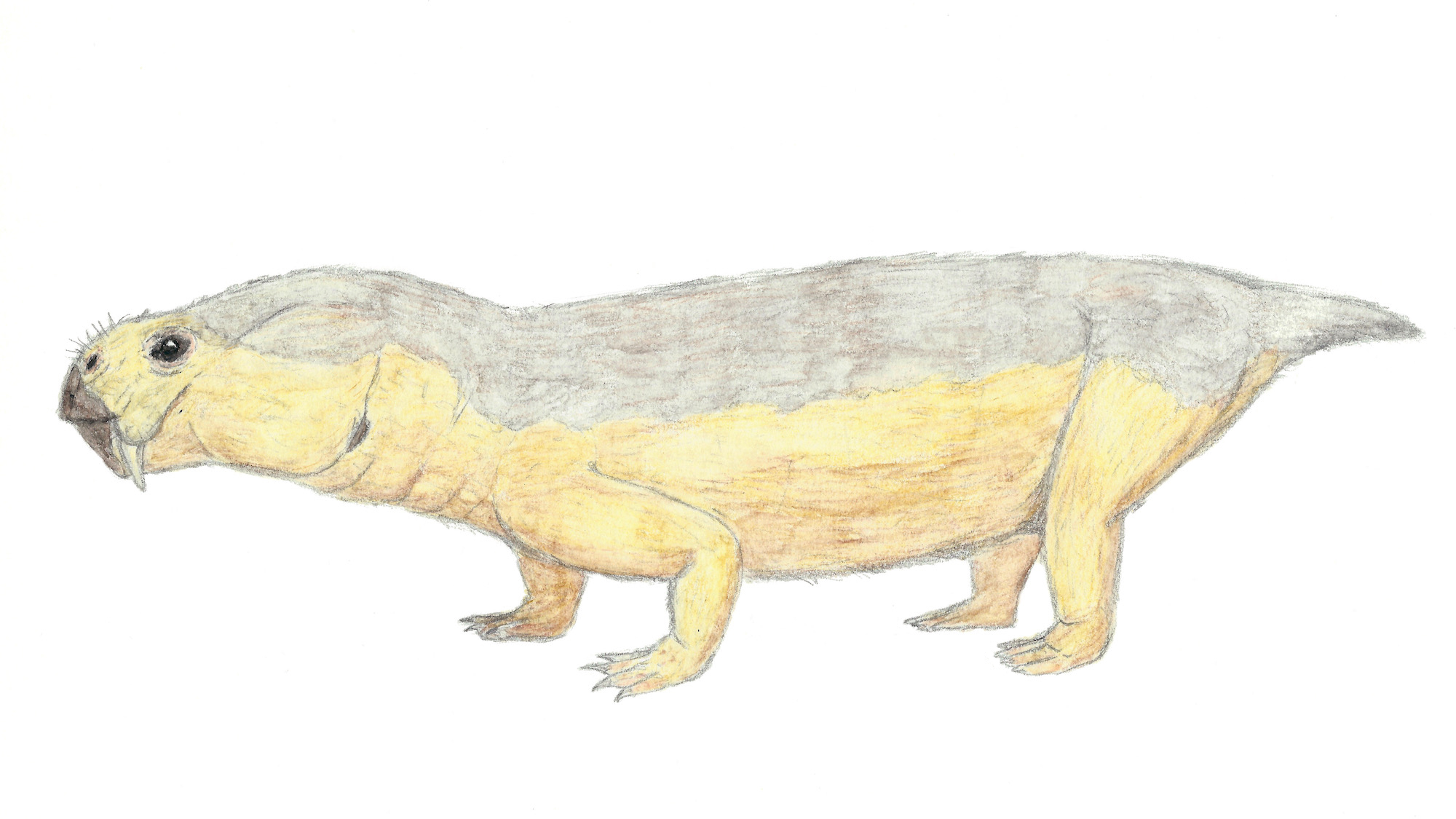
Diictodon

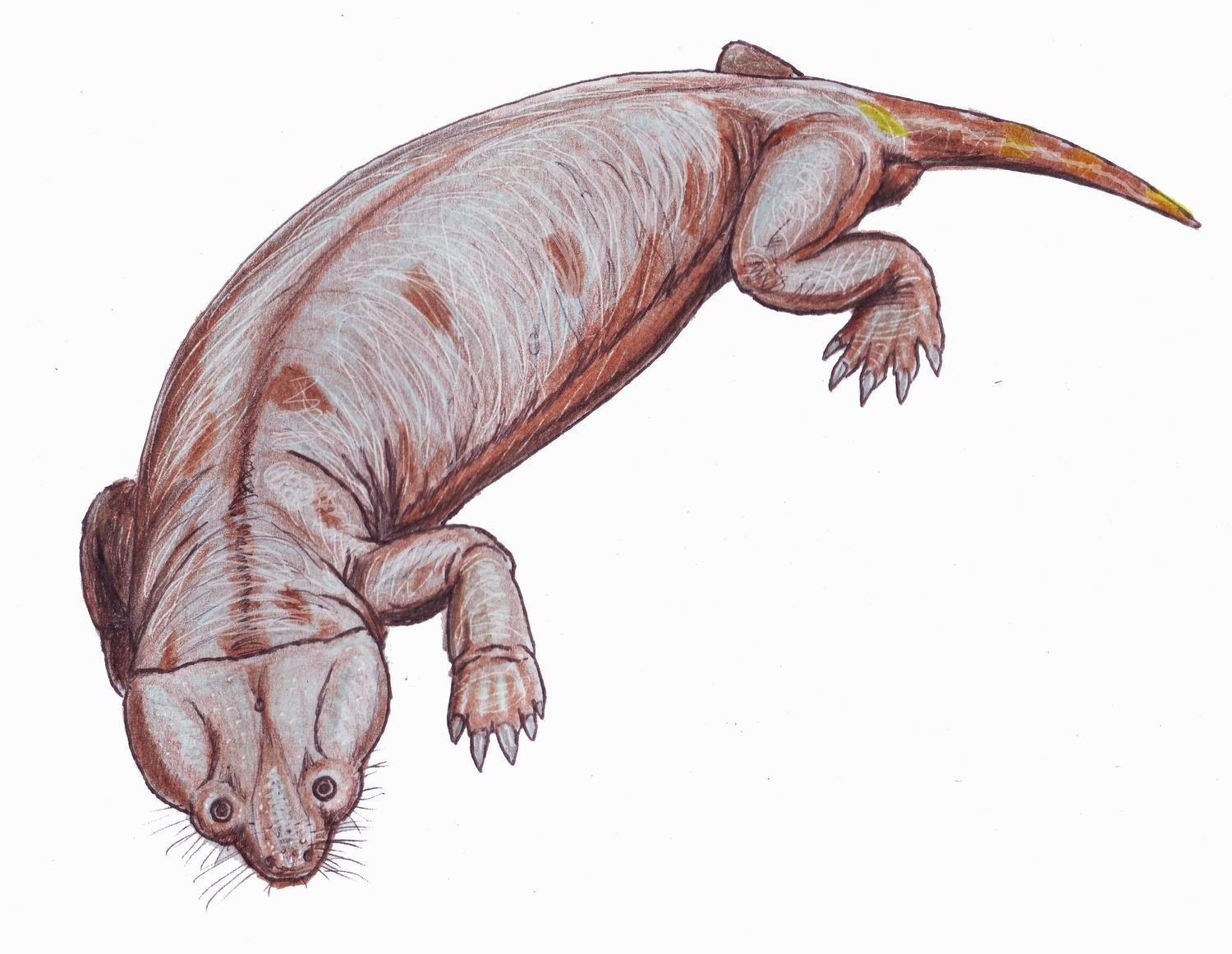
Cistecephalus

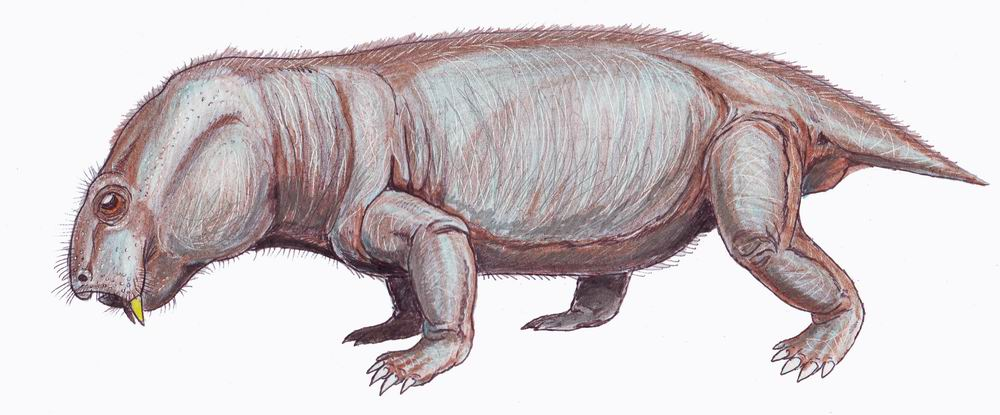
Dicynodontoides, a small dicynodont from Africa's Upper Permian

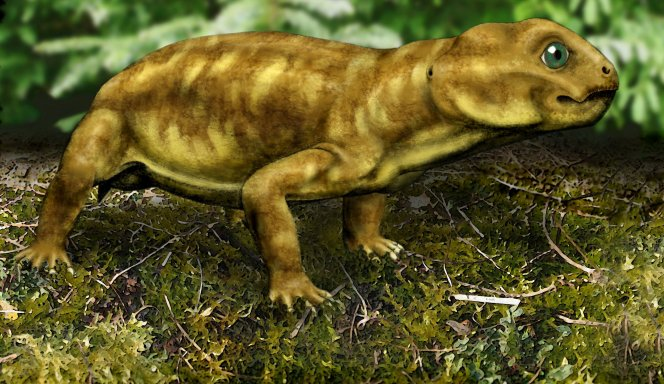
Myosaurus

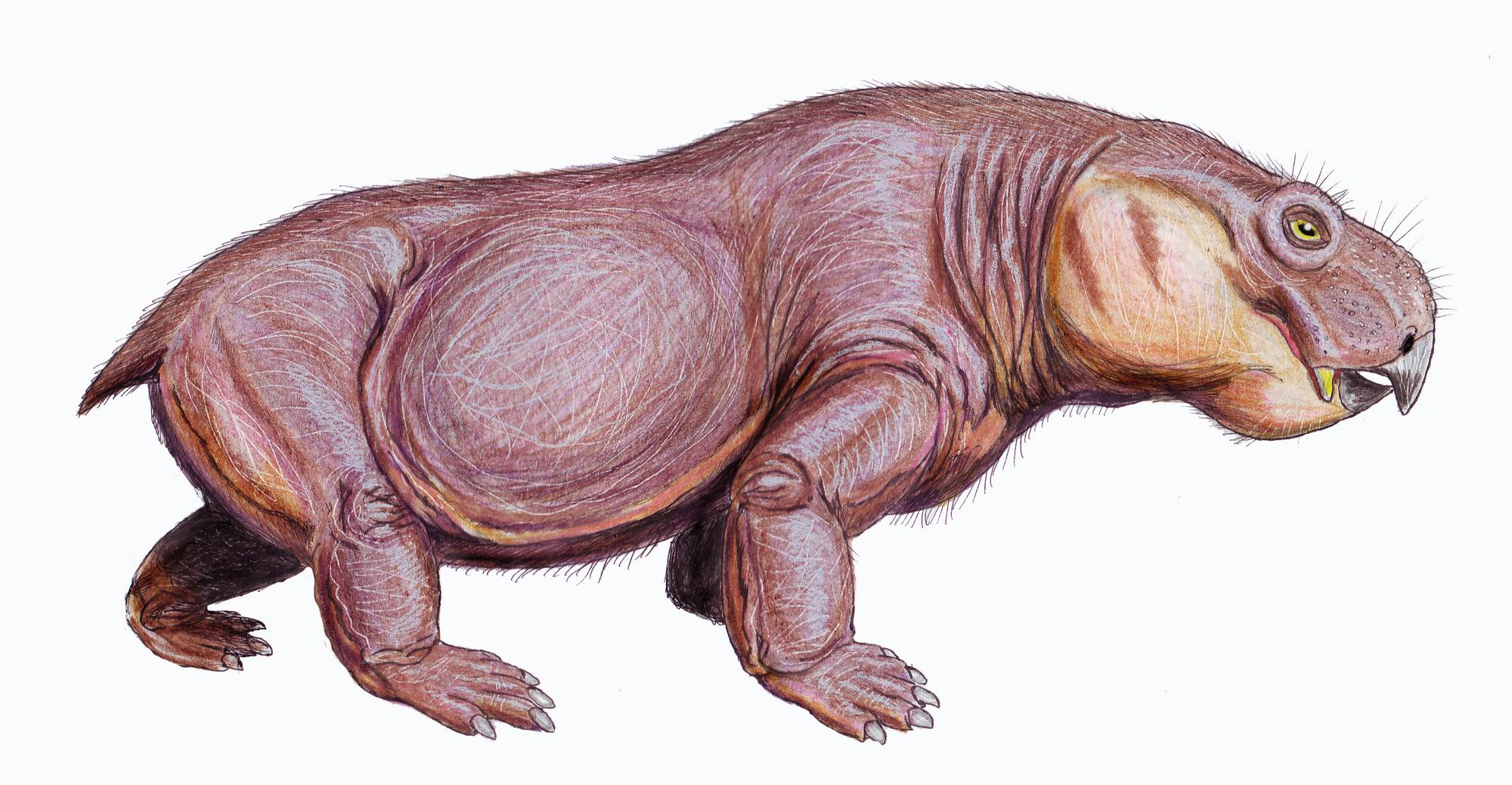
Australobarbarus

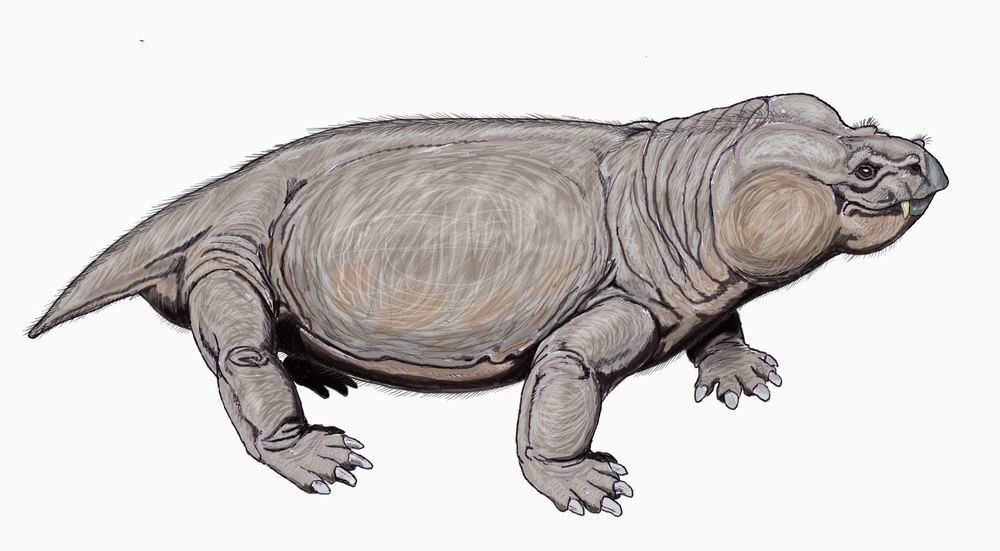
Aulacephalodon

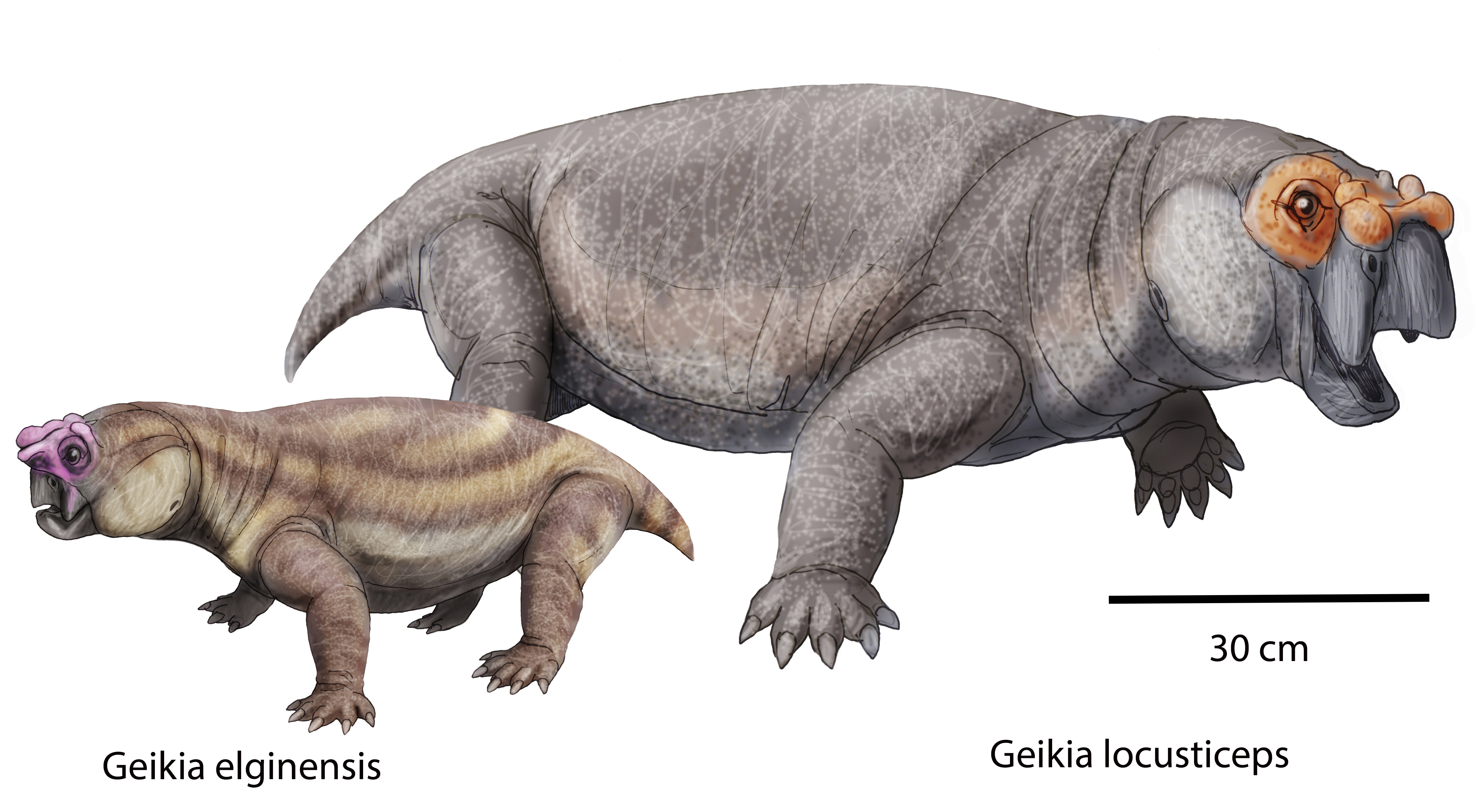
Geikia (G. elginensis and G. locusticeps)

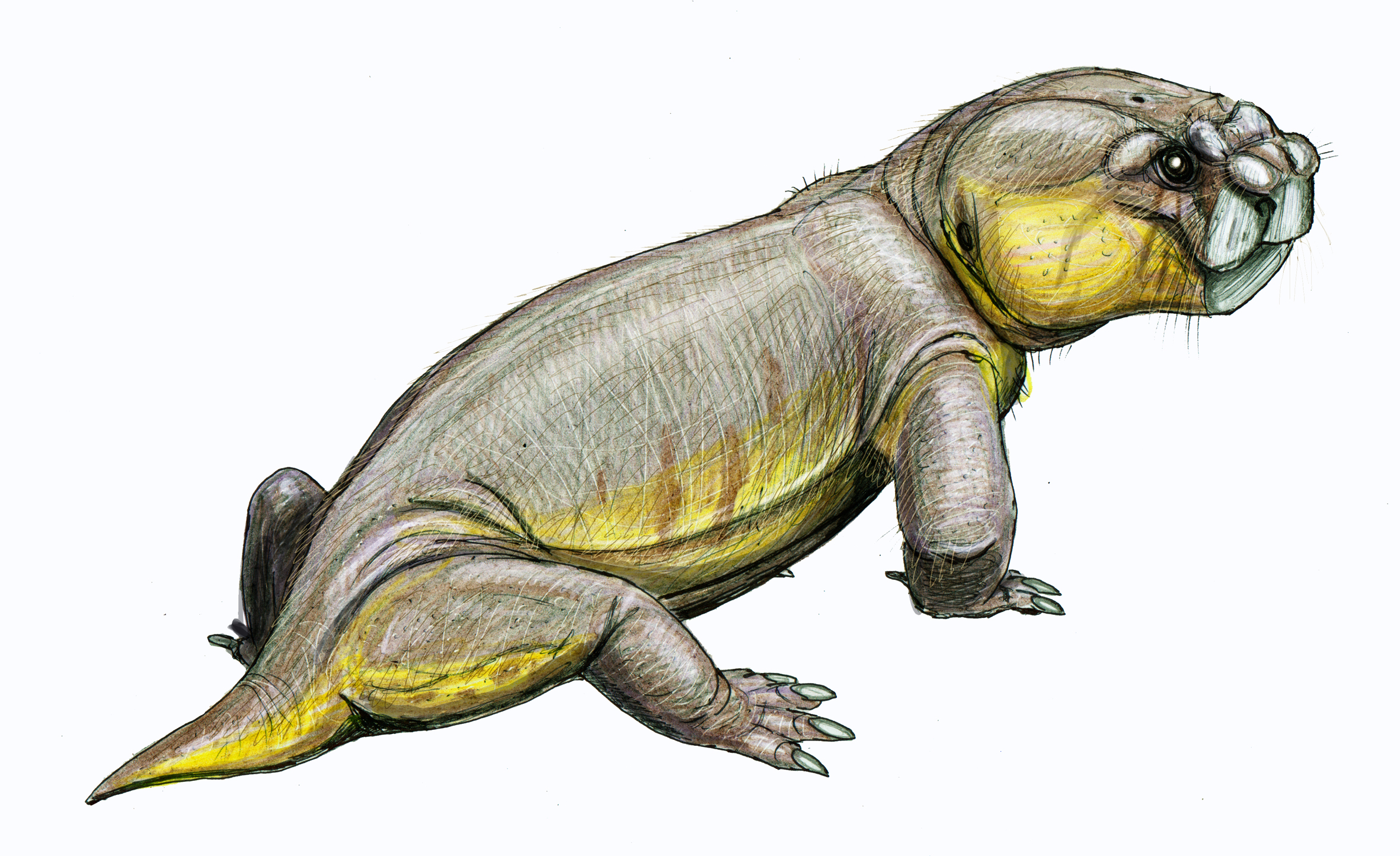
Pelanomodon

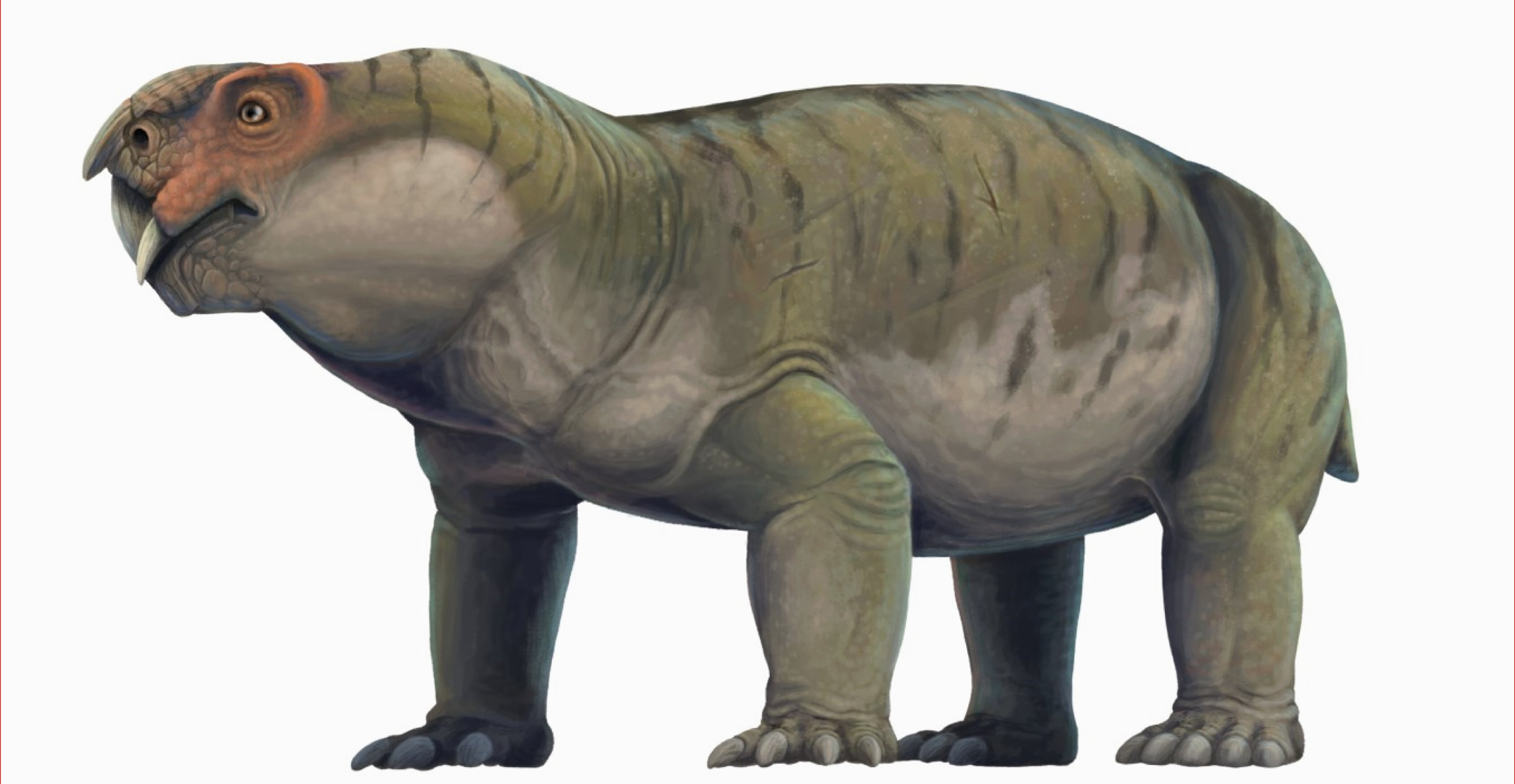
Gordonia

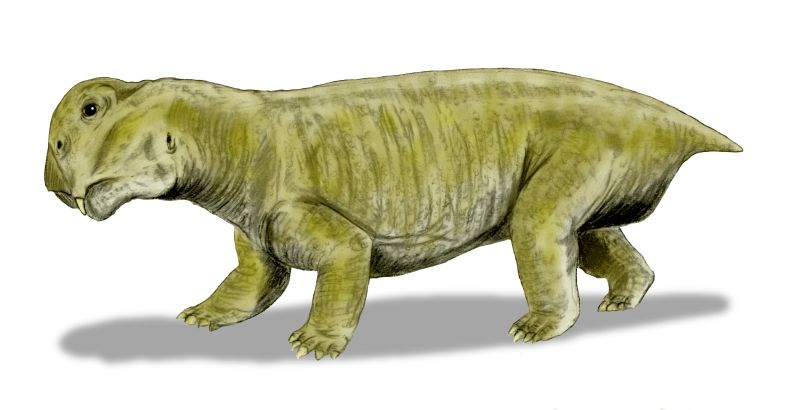
Lystrosaurus murrayi

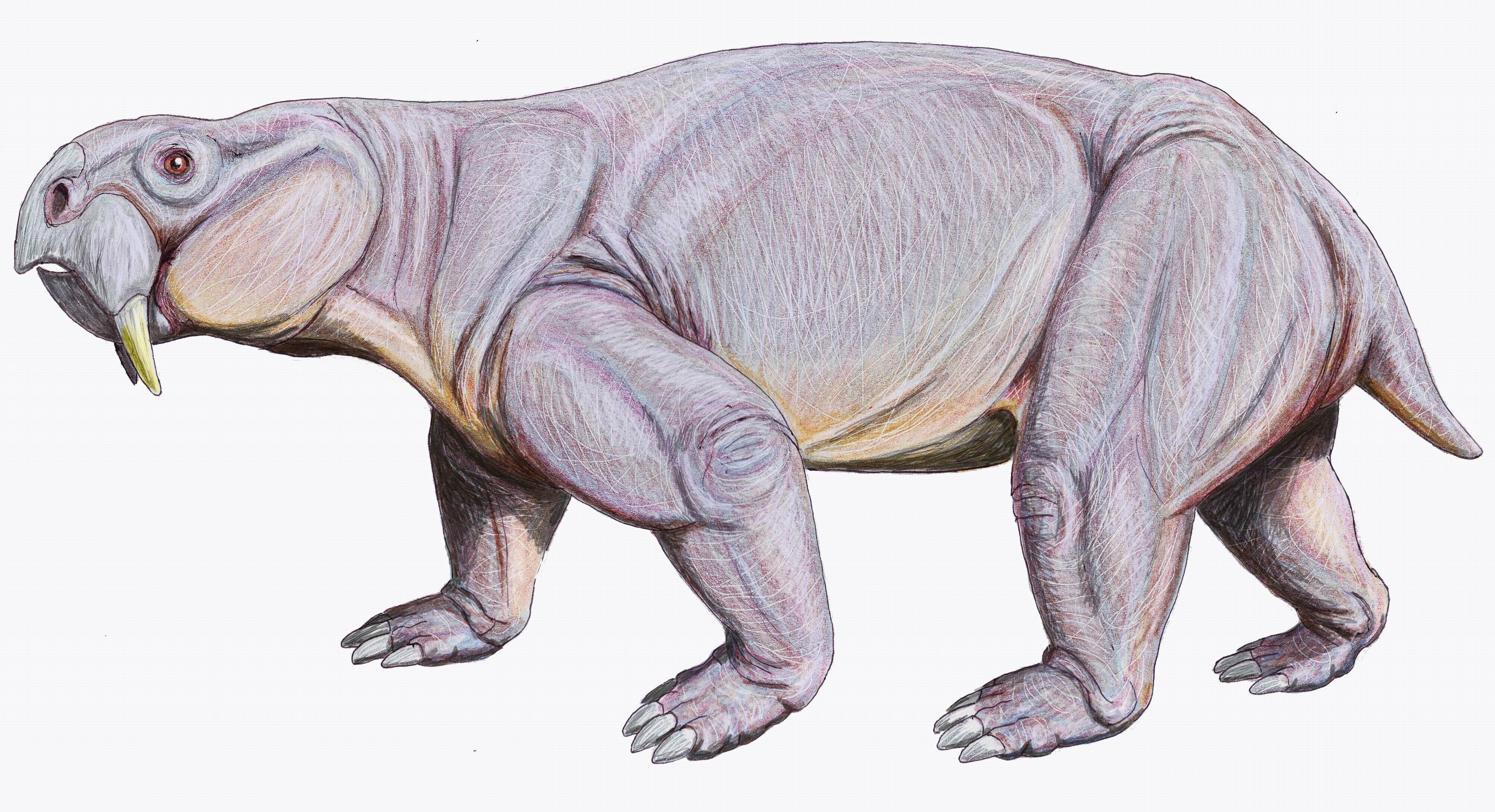
Dinodontosaurus

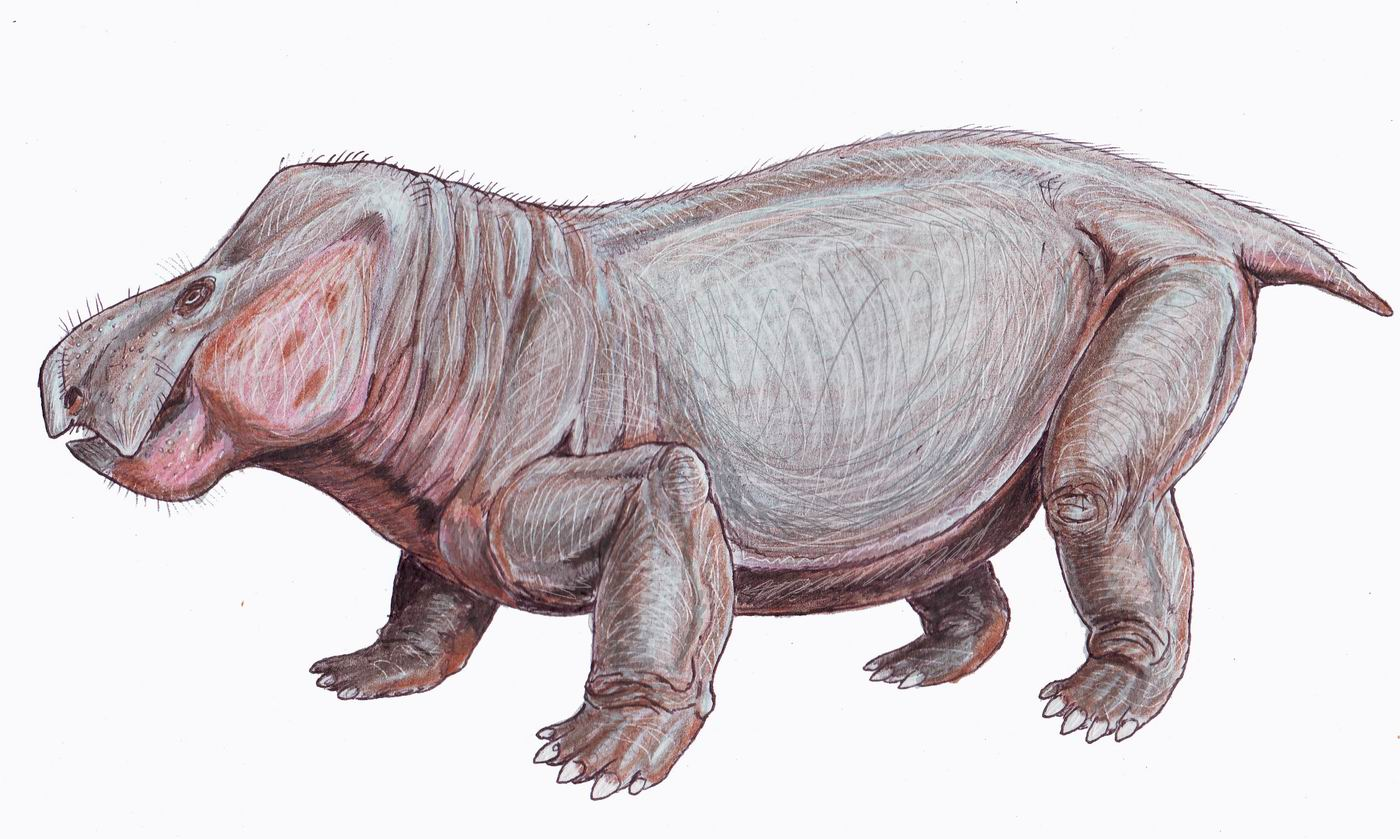
Wadiasaurus

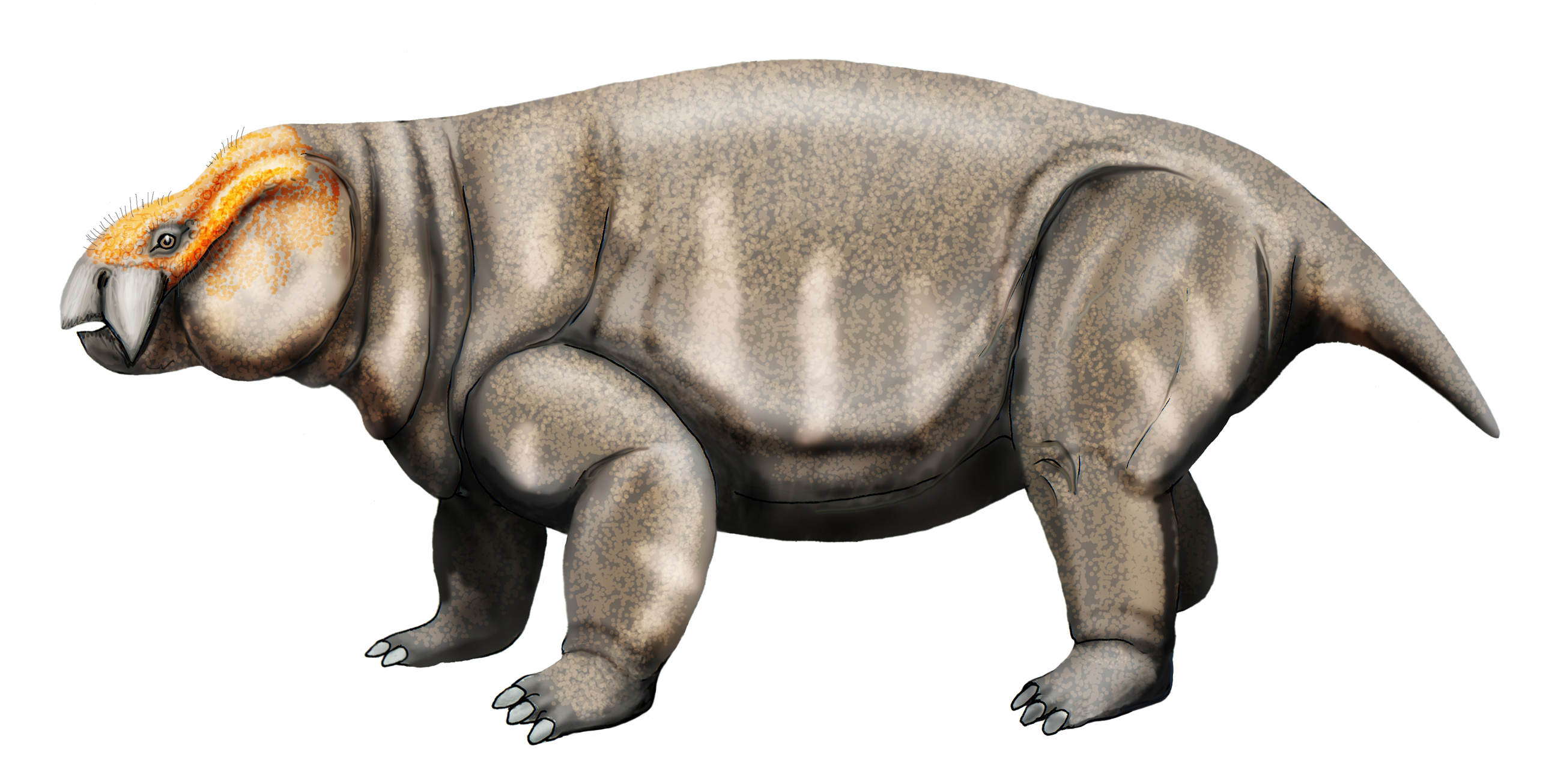
Woznikella

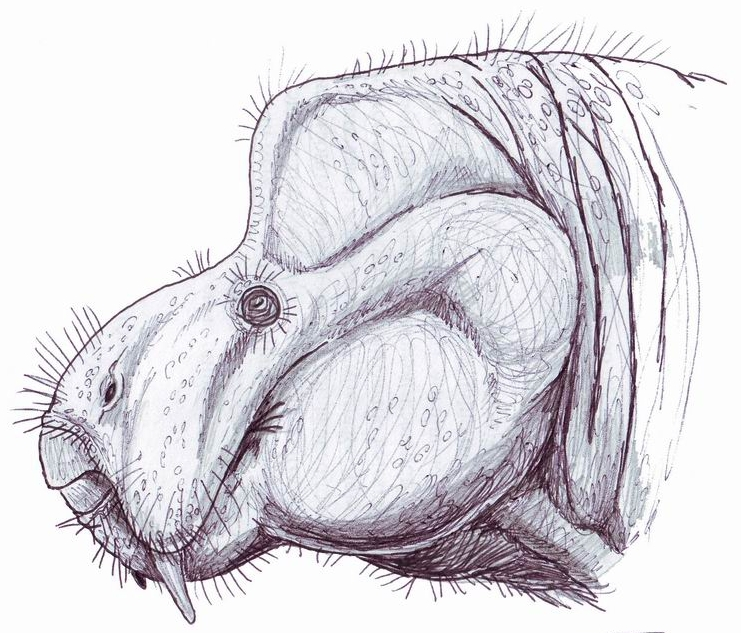
Moghreberia

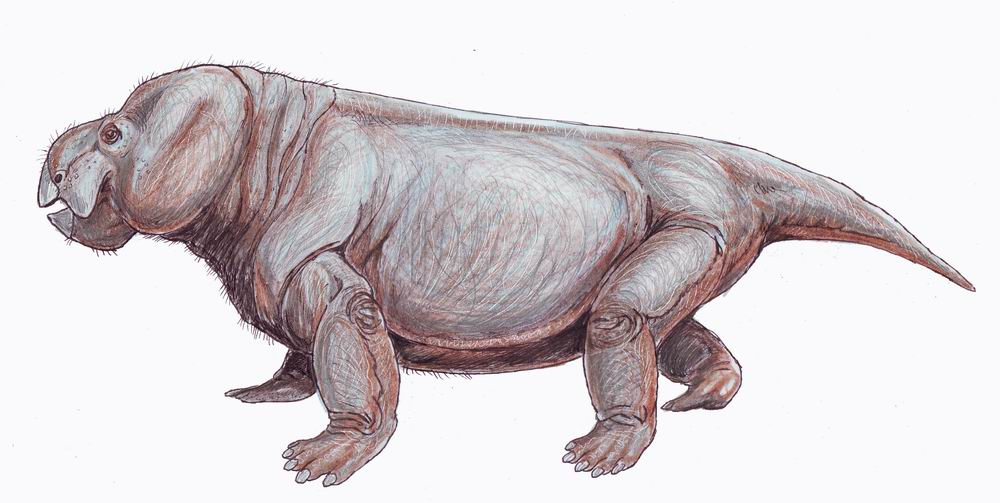
Stahleckeria
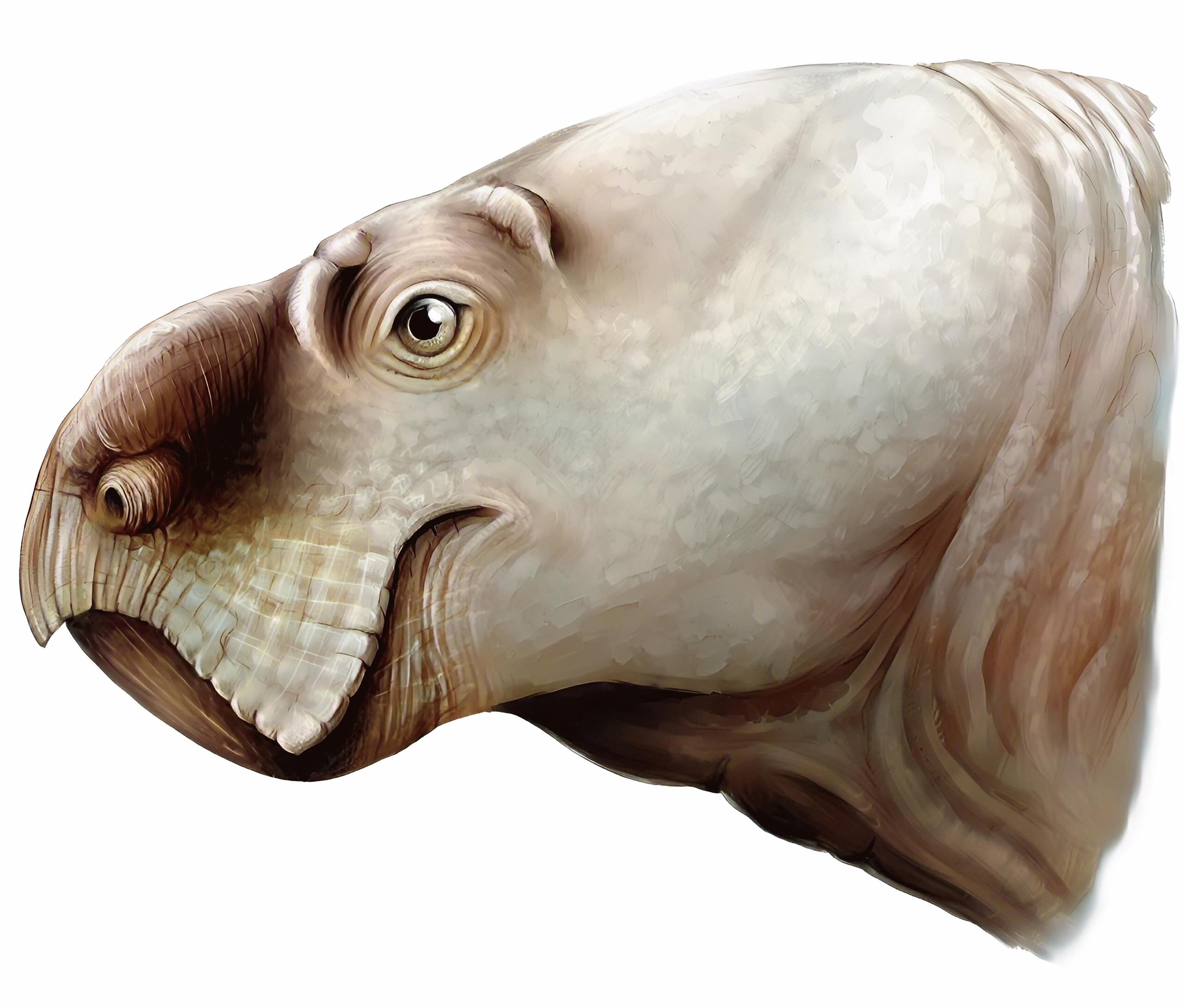
Ufudocyclops

=== Phylogeny ===
Below is a cladogram modified from Angielczyk et al. (2021):

- Dicynodontia
  - Nyaphulia
  - - Eodicynodon
    - - Colobodectes
      - - Lanthanostegus
        - - Pylaecephalidae
          - - Eumantellidae
            - - Brachyprosopus
              - - Endothiodontia
                - Therochelonia
                  - Emydopoidea
                  - Bidentalia

=== Current classification ===
- Dicynodontia
  - Brachyprosopus
  - Colobodectes
  - Eodicynodon
  - Lanthanostegus
  - Nyaphulia
  - Endothiodontia
    - Abajudon
    - Endothiodon
    - Niassodon
  - Eumantellidae
    - Pristerodon
  - Pylaecephalidae
    - Diictodon
    - Eosimops
    - Prosictodon
    - Robertia
  - Therochelonia
    - Emydopoidea
      - Digalodon
      - Rastodon
      - Cistecephalidae
        - Cistecephalus
        - Cistecephaloides
        - Kawingasaurus
        - Kembawacela
        - Sauroscaptor
      - Emydopidae
        - Compsodon
        - Emydops
      - Kingoriidae
        - Dicynodontoides
        - Kombuisia
        - Thliptosaurus
      - Myosauridae
        - Myosauroides
        - Myosaurus
    - Bidentalia
      - Kunpania
      - Cryptodontia
        - Daqingshanodon
        - Keyseria
        - Rhachiocephalidae
          - Kitchinganomodon
          - Rhachiocephalus
        - Oudenodontidae
          - Australobarbarus
          - Oudenodon
          - Tropidostoma
        - Geikiidae
          - Bulbasaurus
          - ?Idelesaurus
          - ?Odontocyclops
          - Geikiinae
            - Aulacephalodon
            - Geikia
            - Pelanomodon
      - Dicynodontoidea
        - Counillonia
        - Daptocephalus
        - Delectosaurus
        - Dicynodon
        - Dinanomodon
        - Elph
        - Gordonia
        - Interpresosaurus
        - Katumbia
        - Peramodon
        - Taoheodon
        - Turfanodon
        - Vivaxosaurus
        - Lystrosauridae
          - ?Basilodon
          - ?Jimusaria
          - ?Sintocephalus
          - ?Syops
          - Euptychognathus
          - Kwazulusaurus
          - Lystrosaurus
        - Kannemeyeriiformes
          - Angonisaurus
          - Dinodontosauridae
            - Dinodontosaurus
          - Shansiodontidae
            - Rhinodicynodon
            - Shansiodon
            - Tetragonias
            - Vinceria
          - Kannemeyeriidae
            - Acratophorus
            - Dolichuranus
            - Kannemeyeria
            - Parakannemeyeria
            - Rabidosaurus
            - Rechnisaurus
            - Rhadiodromus
            - Shaanbeikannemeyeria
            - Sinokannemeyeria
            - Uralokannemeyeria
            - Wadiasaurus
            - Xiyukannemeyeria
          - Stahleckeriidae
            - ?Sungeodon
            - Woznikella
            - Placeriinae
              - Argodicynodon
              - Lisowicia
              - Moghreberia
              - Placerias
              - Pentasaurus
              - Zambiasaurus
            - Stahleckeriinae
              - Eubrachiosaurus
              - Ischigualastia
              - Jachaleria
              - Sangusaurus
              - Stahleckeria
              - Ufudocyclops

== See also ==
- Dromasauria
- Evolution of mammals
