= Abajudon =

Abajudon Temporal range: Middle Permian

Scientific classification
- Kingdom: Animalia
- Phylum: Chordata
- Clade: Synapsida
- Clade: Therapsida
- Clade: †Anomodontia
- Clade: †Dicynodontia
- Family: †Endothiodontidae
- Genus: †Abajudon
- Species: †A. kaayai

Binomial name
- †Abajudon kaayai Angielczyk et al. 2014

Extinct genus of dicynodonts

Abajudon is an extinct monotypic genus of dicynodont that lived in what is now the Ruhuhu Formation of Tanzania, Africa (then a part of Pangaea) during the Guadalupian epoch.

== Description ==
The autapomorphies of Abajudon kaayai include maxillary teeth that bear a deep groove on the mesial surface as well as procurved tips and that are triangular in cross-section. It also possessed a round depression on the anteriormost ventral surface of the premaxilla, a transverse flange of the pterygoid that was large and ventrally directed, elongate palatine pads with paired depressions on the palatine's ventral surface, round bosses on the lateral face of the dentary, and a dentary symphysis drawn upwards into a spike.
