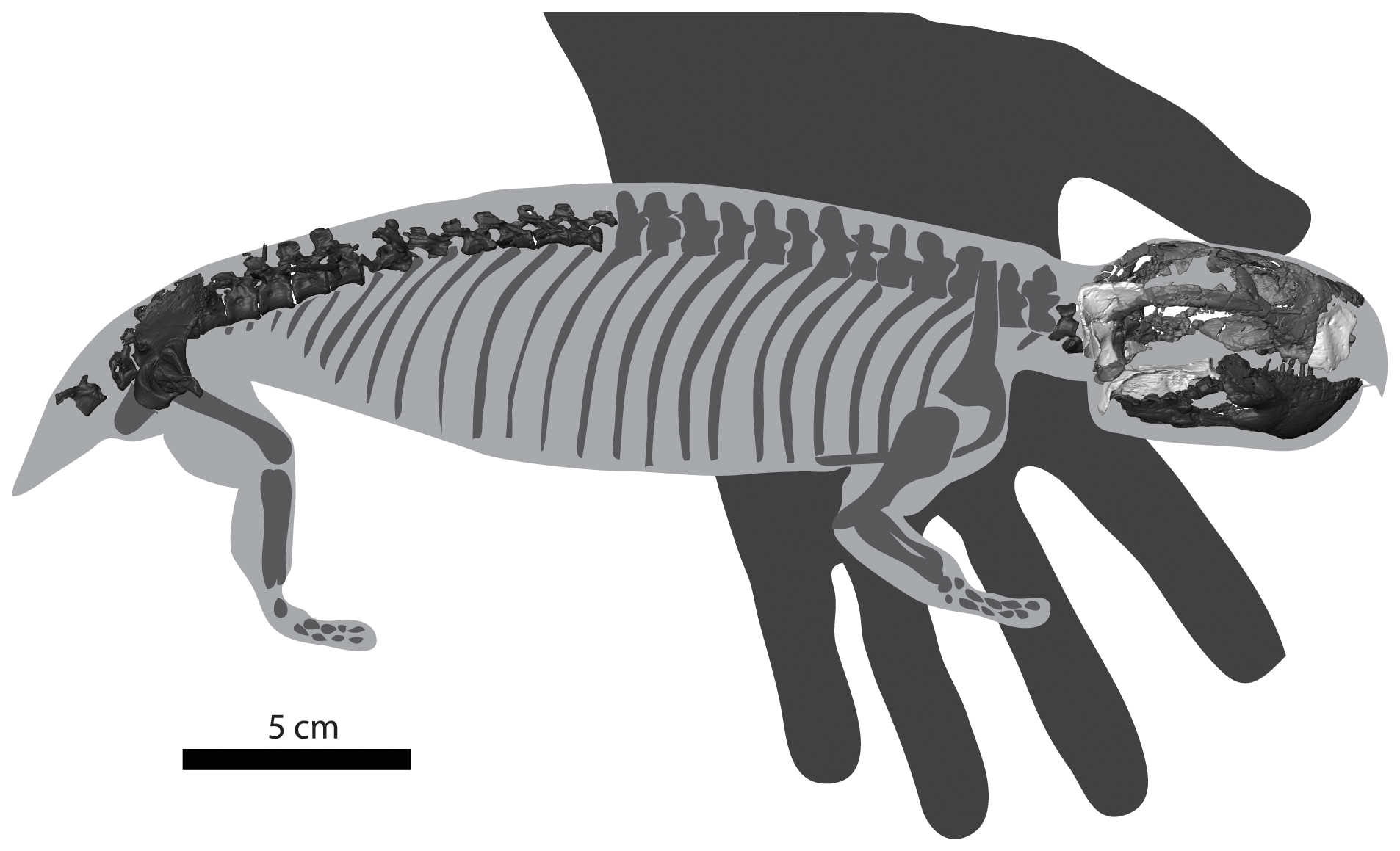
- Skeletal reconstruction of Niassodon mfumukasi (ML1620). Preserved material is highlighted.

Scientific classification
- Domain: Eukaryota
- Kingdom: Animalia
- Phylum: Chordata
- Clade: Synapsida
- Clade: Therapsida
- Suborder: †Anomodontia
- Clade: †Dicynodontia
- Clade: †Endothiodontia
- Genus: †Niassodon; Castanhinha et al., 2013

Type species
- †Niassodon mfumukasi Castanhinha et al., 2013

= Niassodon =

Niassodon Temporal range: Late Permian 259.9–254.17 Ma

Extinct genus of dicynodonts

Niassodon is an extinct genus of kingoriid dicynodont therapsid known from the Late Permian of Niassa Province, northern Mozambique. It contains a single species, Niassodon mfumukasi.

== Discovery and naming ==
3D animation of reconstructed Niassodon mfumukasi skull and atlas

Niassodon was first described and named by Rui Castanhinha, Ricardo Araújo, Luís C. Júnior, Kenneth D. Angielczyk, Gabriel G. Martins, Rui M. S. Martins, Claudine Chaouiya, Felix Beckmann and Fabian Wilde in 2013 and the type species is Niassodon mfumukasi. The generic name combines the word Niassa, meaning "lake" in Chiyao and the name of the northwestern province in Mozambique where Niassodon was found, with odontos, meaning "tooth" in Ancient Greek. The specific name, Mfumukasi means "queen" in Nyanja, in honor of the members of the local Nyanja matriarchal society and all Mozambican women.

Niassodon is known solely from the holotype ML1620, a partial skeleton which has returned to the Museu Nacional de Geologia, Maputo, Mozambique. The holotype consists of a complete skull, a mandible, series of 19 dorsal, sacral and caudal vertebrae, ribs, both ilia and a partial femur, from a single small individual (skull length is 58 mm). It was discovered by Ricardo Araújo and collected during a 2009 expedition in the Metangula Graben, under the supervision of Projecto PaleoMoz. ML1620 came from the K5 Formation located near Tulo, a small village situated along the Metangula-Cóbue road. The fossil bed is composed of a grey mudstone with abundant septaria-like calcareous concretions, dating to the Late Permian.
