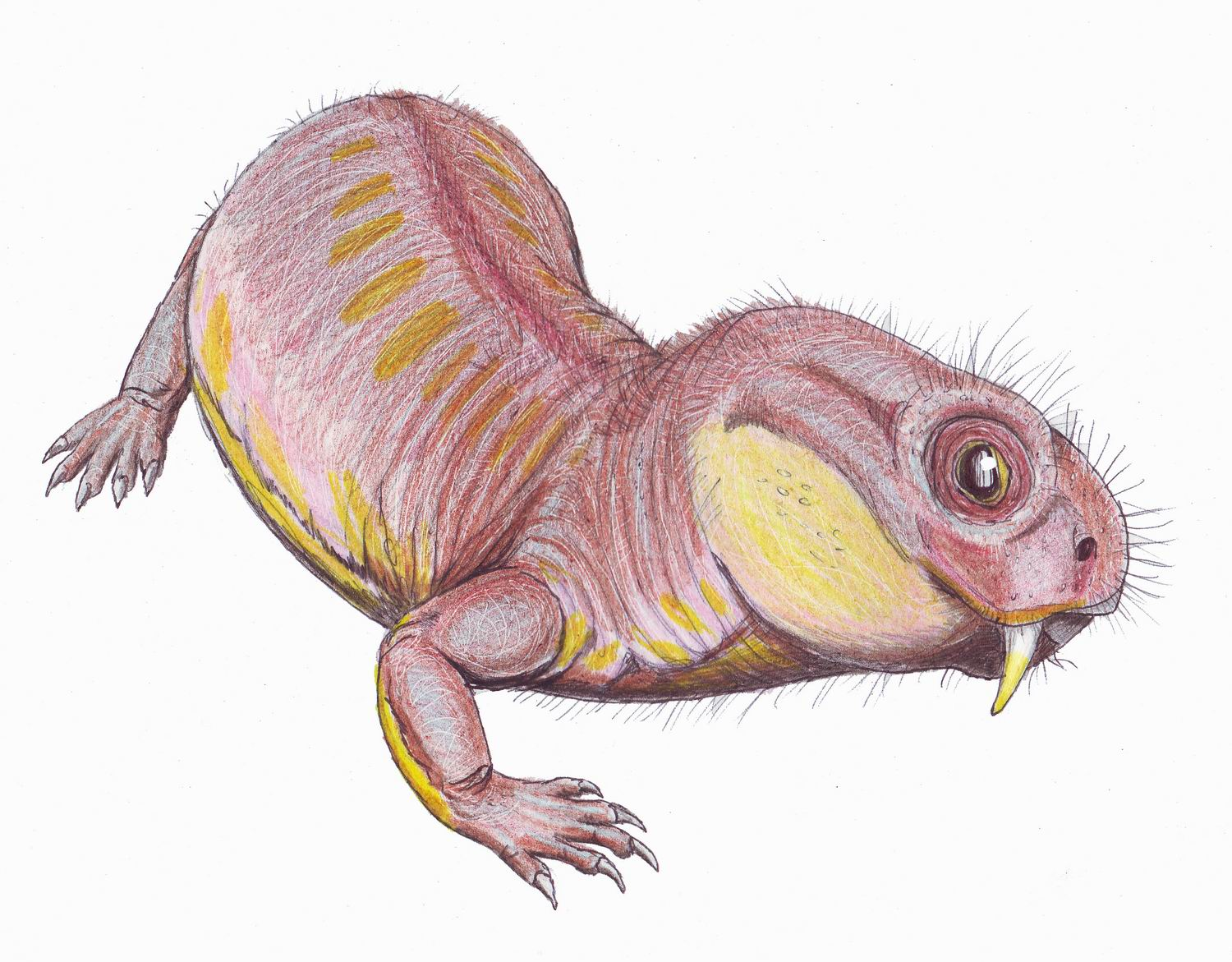
- Robertia, a primitive Diictodont.

Scientific classification
- Kingdom: Animalia
- Phylum: Chordata
- Clade: Synapsida
- Clade: Therapsida
- Clade: †Anomodontia
- Clade: †Dicynodontia
- Clade: †Diictodontia

Groups
- Pylaecephalidae; Diictodon; Eosimops; Koupia?; Prosictodon; Robertia; Emydopoidea; Brachyprosopus; Compsodon; Cryptocynodon; Emydops; Kistecephalia; Digalodon; Myosaurus; Cistecephalidae; Cistecephaloides; Cistecephalus; Kawingasaurus; Kembawacela; Sauroscaptor; Kingoriidae; Dicynodontoides; Kombuisia; Thliptosaurus

= Diictodontia =

Diictodonts Temporal range: Middle Permian–Middle Triassic

Extinct clade of dicynodonts

The Diictodontia were a group of herbivorous dicynodonts from the Permian and Triassic of South Africa.

The clade was named a sub group of the group Dicynodontia by Robert L. Carroll in 1988.

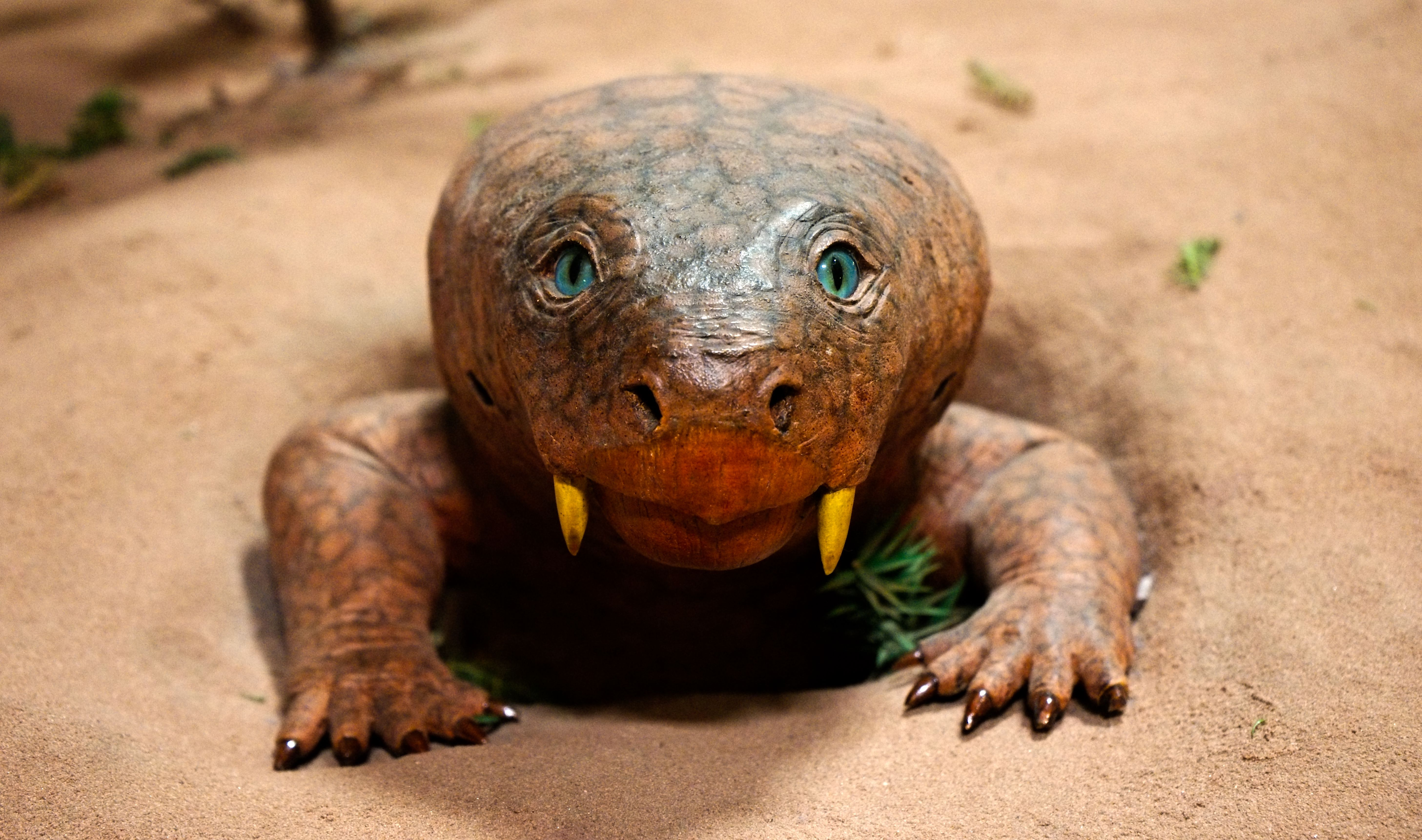
A model of the genus Diictodon

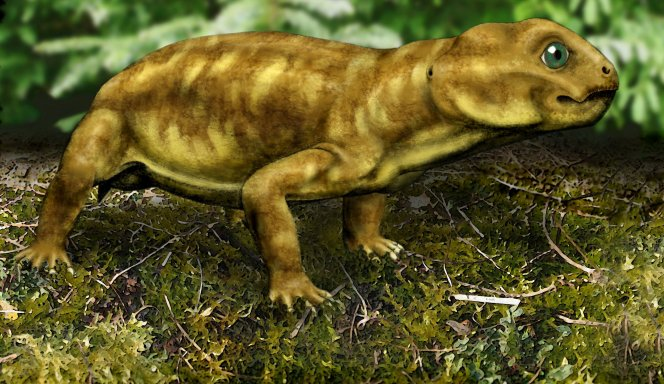
Myosaurus, an Emydopid

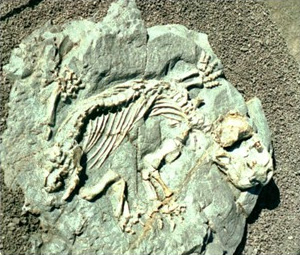
A Diictodon fossil
