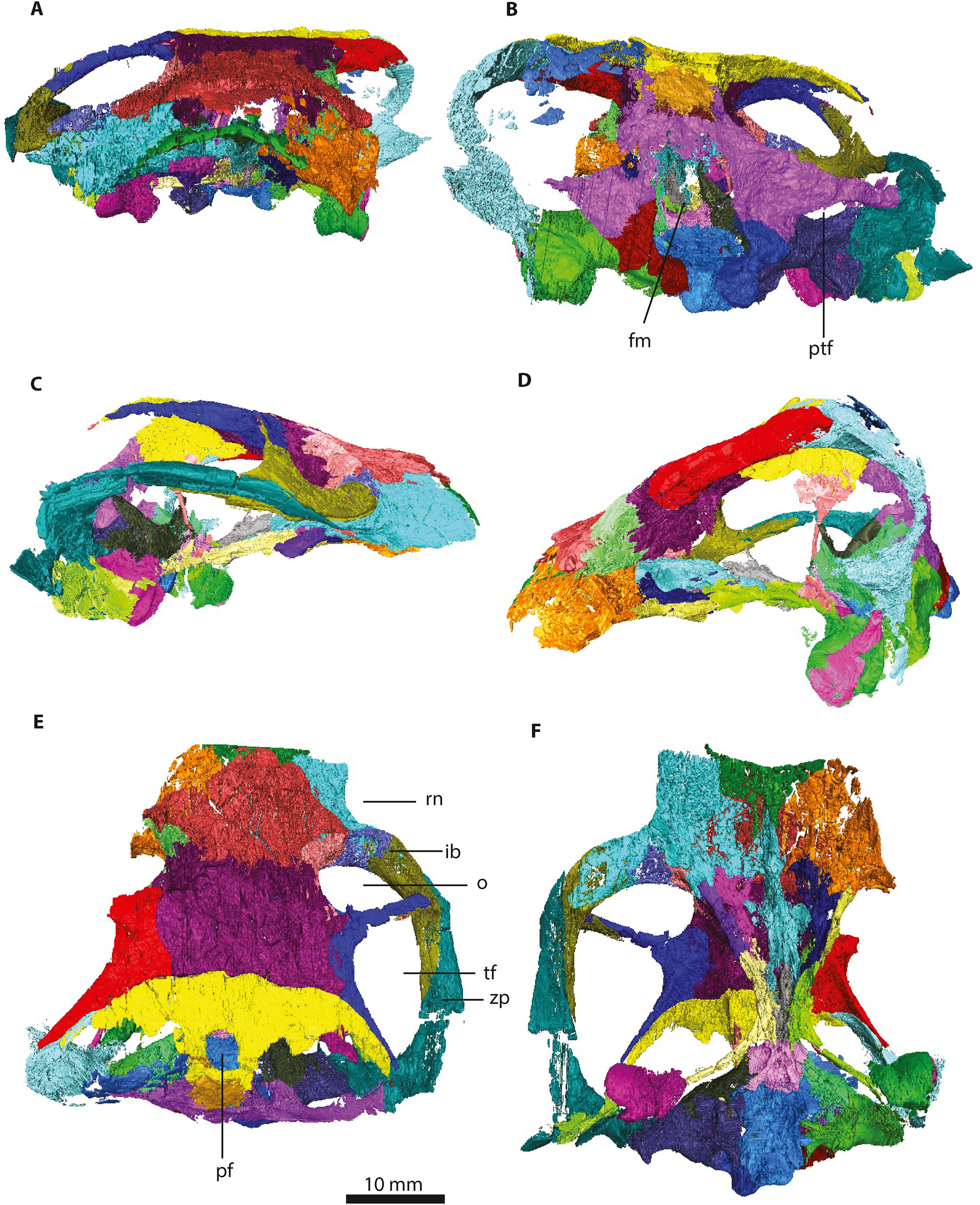
- Skull of K. yajuwayeyi

Scientific classification
- Kingdom: Animalia
- Phylum: Chordata
- Clade: Synapsida
- Clade: Therapsida
- Clade: †Anomodontia
- Clade: †Dicynodontia
- Family: †Cistecephalidae
- Genus: †Kembawacela; Angielczyk, Benoit & Rubidge, 2019

Type species
- †Kembawacela kitchingi Angielczyk, Benoit & Rubidge, 2019

Other species
- †K. yajuwayeyi Araújo et al. 2022

= Kembawacela =

Kembawacela Temporal range: Late Permian Wuchiapingian–Changhsingian

Extinct genus of dicynodonts

Kembawacela ("iron digger") is an extinct genus of cistecephalid dicynodont from the Late Permian of East Africa. The genus contains two known species, the type species Kembawacela kitchingi from the Madumabisa Mudstone Formation of Zambia described in 2019, and a second species, K. yajuwayeyi, from the Chiweta Beds of Malawi described in 2022. Like other cistecephalids, Kembawacela was specialised for a fossorial, burrowing lifestyle similar to modern day moles. It is unique amongst cistecephalids for the presence of a pair of tusks in the upper jaw, characteristic of many other dicynodonts but lost in other cistecephalids. It is likely that Kembawacela was a locally endemic species of cistecephalid in the Luangwa Basin of Zambia.

== Description ==
Kembawacela broadly resembled other cistecephalids in size and shape. It was a small dicynodont (skull length roughly 5 centimetres (2.0 in) long along the base) and had a highly specialised body plan for digging. Kembawacela is known from skulls, lower jaws and various pieces of postcrania, including parts of the pelvis, femur, ulna and various vertebrae. Although broadly similar in superficial appearance, the two species K. kitchingi and K. yajuwayeyi can be distinguished by details of the skull architecture.

Its skull is typical for cistecephalids, with a broad head and large temporal fenestra with a very short, tapered snout. It had large, strongly forward facing eyes like some other cistecephalids (including Cistecephalus), but unlike the smaller, sideways facing eyes of Cistecephaloides and Kawingasaurus. Similarly, the zygomatic arches project out almost laterally behind the eyes and curve back almost 90 degrees to the back of the skull. The pineal foramen ("third eye") is positioned very far back on the roof of the skull, overhanging the very back of the skull (similar to Sauroscaptor). Kembawacela is most obviously distinguished by the prominent tusks in its upper jaw. The majority of Kembawacela specimens have these tusks, and it is possible that they were sexually dimorphic in this species. These tusks face slightly out to the sides, but do not sit out on a prominent caniniform process projecting from the jaw margin like in some other dicynodonts. Aside from the tusks, Kembawacela was otherwise toothless, and possessed a keratinous beak at the tips of its jaws, as is typical of dicynodonts. The beak was relatively broad and blunt, and the tip of the upper jaw was arched upwards.

Between K. kitchingi and K. yajuwayeyi, they can be distinguished by details of the individual bones and anatomy of the skull, including the shape of the jugal bone of the cheek. In K. kitchingi, the ascending process that joins to the postorbital bone to form the postorbital bar rimming the eye socket is exposed on the back of the bar, while in K. yajuwayeyi it is hidden on the internal side. Further, the anterior process of the jugal beneath the eye is notably taller in K. yajuwayeyi than in K. kitchingi, despite the only known skull of the former being slightly compressed. Another difference is in the position of the maxillary canal, a channel for the sensitive trigeminal nerve and its blood vessels in the snout. In K. kitchingi it emerges and runs laterally from the maxillary sinus, whereas the canal sits just anteriorly in front of the sinus in K. yajuwayeyi. The angle between the anterior rami of the pterygoid bones (sheets of bone connecting to the palatine bones in front) on the roof of the mouth also differs between them, with K. yajuwayeyi having a much narrower ~46° angle between them compared to the ~61° of K. kitchingi.

The body of Kembawacela is poorly known, but the preserved skeleton of K. kitchingi resembles that of other cistecephalids like Cistecephalus. It had three sacral vertebrae and an ilium with well developed forward and backward pointing processes, and a large, robust ulna in the arm. Unlike Cistecephalus, however, the head of the femur is roughly triangular shaped.

== History of discovery ==
Specimens of Kembawacela were first discovered and collected in the 1960s by Alan Drysdall and James Kitching in the Luangwa Basin of Zambia. They reported discovering at least 13 specimens that they preliminarily assigned to Cistecephalus microrhinus and the now synonymous C. planiceps. Four of these specimens were identified in the collections of the Evolutionary Studies Institute at the University of the Witwatersrand in Johannesburg, South Africa, although a possible fifth specimen originally noted by Kitching has since been lost.

The specimens were later suggested to belong to a new species of Cistcephalus in an unpublished BSc honours thesis by Freeman in 1993. Further examinations and the discovery of an additional four specimens proposed that the Luangwa cistecephalid was an entirely new genus. In 2019, the taxon was formally described in detail and named Kembawacela kitchingi by Kenneth Angielczyk, Julien Benoit and Bruce Rubidge. The genus name is from the phrase "kemba wacela", translated to "iron digger" in the locally spoken Bemba language. It was named for the iron-rich hematite nodules various specimens from the Luangwa Basin—including the type specimen of Kembawacela (NHCC LB18)—have been found in, as well referring to the proposed digging lifestyle of cistecephalids. The species was named to honour James Kitching, who collected the first specimens of Kembawacela.

The specimens were collected from various different localities in the Luangwa Basin, but were all from the upper Madumabisa Mudstone Formation. This formation is believed to overlap in time with the Cistecephalus Assemblage Zone (AZ) and Daptocephalus AZ of the Karoo Basin in South Africa, which have been dated to the Wuchiapingian to early Changhsingian in the Late Permian. The specimens are housed at both the Evolutionary Studies Institute in South Africa and at the National Heritage Conservation Commission in Lusaka, Zambia.

In 2016, a cistecephalid skull (DMMM-PK-16-1) was found encased in a rock nodule during exploration of the Chiweta Beds in the Mount Waller Area of Northern Malawi. Due its small size and delicate nature, the examination of the specimen was performed using x-ray microtomography to image the bones inside the rock matrix. This skull was formally described and named as a new species of Kembawacela, K. yajuwayeyi, by Araújo and colleagues in 2022. The authors named the species in honour of their friend Dr. Yusuf Juwayeyi, an accomplished archaeologist, professor, and international representative of Malawian research. The species name combines the surname Juwayeyi with Ya-, the possessive prefix in the Chichewa language. The skull is mostly complete, missing only the tip of the snout, its left zygomatic arch and postorbital bar behind the eye, and parts of the occiput.

== Classification ==
Kembawacela is well supported as a member of the family Cistecephalidae in the phylogenetic analysis of Angielczyk et al. (2019), where it was found as a relatively basal member of the clade:

- Kistecephalia
  - Kingoriidae
  - - - Compsodon
      - Emydops
    - - Digalodon
      - - Myosaurus
        - Cistecephalidae
          - Cistecephalus
          - - Kembawacela
            - - Sauroscaptor
              - - Kawingasaurus
                - Cistecephaloides

Kembawacela is primarily distinguished from other cistecephalids by its tusks, but can also be uniquely diagnosed by a trough on the underside of the vomer and an interparietal bone with paired extensions that reach up from the back of the skull to flank the pineal foramen. There are also various other slight differences of the skull and skeleton between it and other cistecephalids.

== Palaeobiology ==
It is possible that Kembawacela was sexually dimorphic, as two of the seven known specimens appear to have lacked tusks. Notably, one of these specimens is the largest known individual, implying that the lack of tusks was not due to it not being fully grown yet. Sexual dimorphism is known from other cistecephalids, such as the prominent ridges over the eyes in Cistecephalus, and although Kembawacela lacks those traits the presence or absence of tusks is suggested to be an indicator of sexual dimorphism more broadly in dicynodonts. Unfortunately, the relatively small sample size means this possibility cannot be statistically analysed.

The tusks of Kembawacela are also notable as one specimen preserves unerupted tusks within the jaw bones. There is no evidence that these tusks are replacements of a previous pair (as has been suggested to occur in Diictodon), and another specimen with the inside of the jaw exposed preserves no such replacements either. The size of the specimen is comparable to the others, which would suggest that the tusks of Kembawacela may not have erupted until quite late in the animal's life, close to their mature body size. It's possible that this relatively late eruption of the tusks in Kembawacela was taken even further in other cistecephalids, where their development was suppressed and prevented entirely from erupting in the tuskless species.

=== Burrowing ===
Kembawacela shares various features with other cistecephalids associated with a fossorial (burrowing) lifestyle. The ulna, the only known bone from the forelimb, has the typically large olecranon process associated with scratch-digging found in other cistecephalids.

The skull has various features associated with burrowing, being broad and wedge-shaped. The large, forward facing eyes may be related to seeing in low-light environments, with binocular vision providing greater light sensitivity, although this is not typical of modern fossorial mammals which have small eyes (as in Cistecephaloides and Kawingasaurus). Interestingly, Kembawacela is the only known cistecephalid known to preserve pieces of the bony scleral ring surrounding the eye, and they are remarkably smaller than is suggested by the size of the orbits. However, they were too incompletely preserved to estimate the light sensitivity of the eyes.

The footplates of the bony stapes are large, associated with hearing low-frequency sounds underground, although its inner-ear is not as specialised as Kawingasaurus.

== Palaeoecology ==
Kembawacela coexisted with a wide variety and abundance of other dicynodonts in the upper Madumabisa Mudstone Formation, including Endothiodon, Compsodon, Pristerodon, the burrowing Diictodon feliceps, Emydops, Dicynodontoides, a species similar to Katumbia, Odontocyclops whaitsi, Oudenodon bainii, Kitchinganomodon, Daptocephalus, Syops, Digalodon cf. rubidgei and a species of lystrosaurid. Other therapsids included the locally endemic predatory therocephalians Ichibengops and Mupashi, as well as the more widespread Theriognathus microps and Ictidosuchoides longiceps, along with the semi-aquatic cynodont Procynosuchus and an indeterminate biarmosuchian. Reptiles are represented by the pareiasaur Pareiasuchus, a herbivorous parareptile.

Much of the fauna of the Madumabisa Mudstone Formation is shared with that of the Cistecephalus AZ in the Karoo, South Africa, suggesting the two regions shared similar biomes and were broadly connected. However, the presence of endemic species like Kembawacela are indicative of fine scale variations between the two localities, such as environmental differences. The fossorial lifestyle of Kembawacela and other cistecephalids is a likely factor in its endemism, as its unique ecology would have limited its ability to disperse and so restricted its range to within the Luangwa Basin.

The environment of the upper Madumabisa Mudstone Formation was a wet, vegetated floodplain within a wide rift valley with plentiful sinuous meandering rivers, ponds and lakes prone to episodic flooding.
