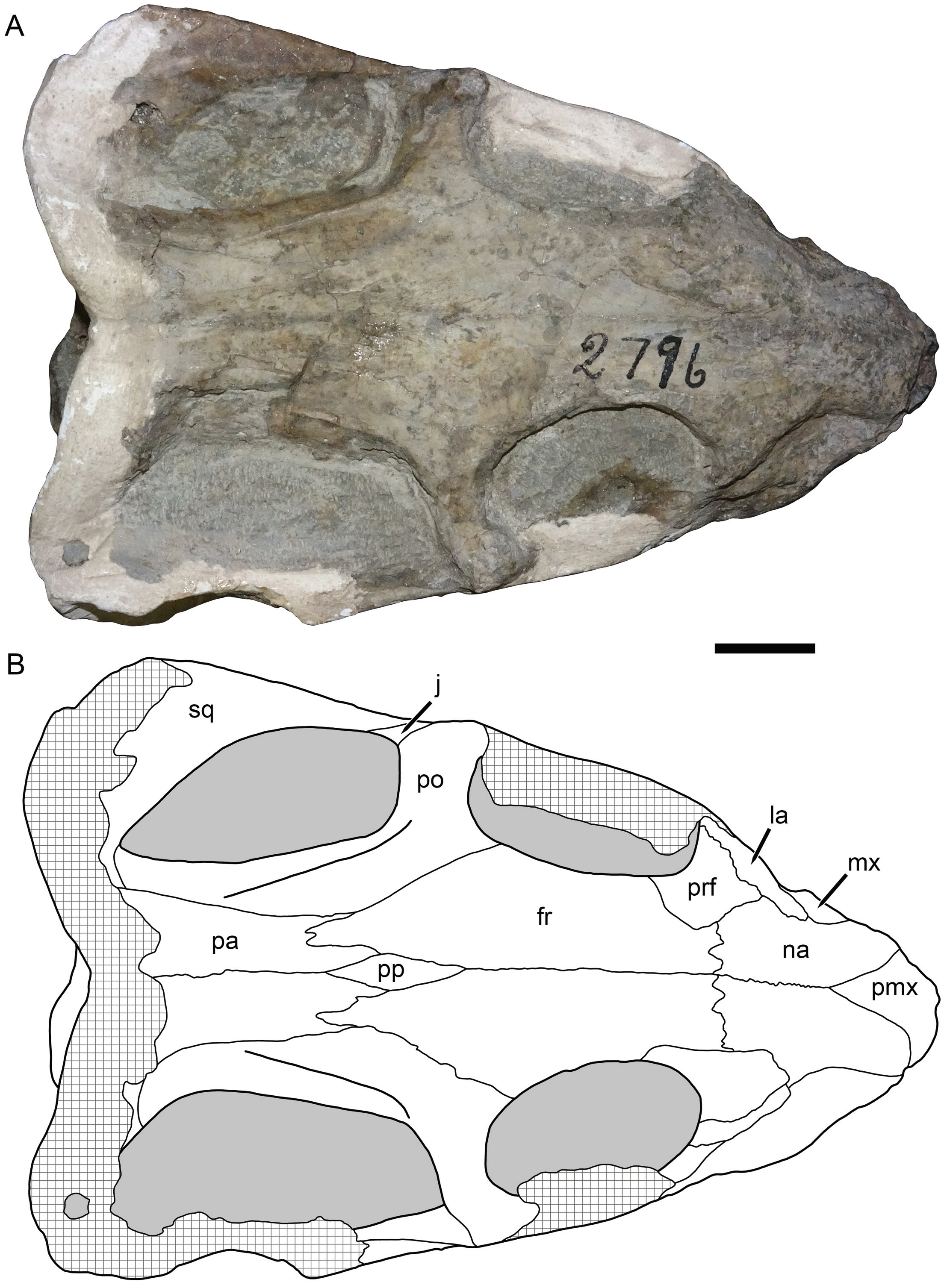
- Photograph and diagram of the holotype skull (BP/1/2796) of Thliptosaurus.

Scientific classification
- Domain: Eukaryota
- Kingdom: Animalia
- Phylum: Chordata
- Clade: Synapsida
- Clade: Therapsida
- Suborder: †Anomodontia
- Clade: †Dicynodontia
- Family: †Kingoriidae
- Genus: †Thliptosaurus; Kammerer, 2019
- Species: †T. imperforatus

Binomial name
- †Thliptosaurus imperforatus Kammerer, 2019

= Thliptosaurus =

Thliptosaurus Temporal range: Daptocephalus Assemblage Zone Changhsingian

Extinct genus of dicynodonts

Thliptosaurus (meaning "compressed lizard") is an extinct genus of small kingoriid dicynodont from the latest Permian period of the Karoo Basin in KwaZulu-Natal, South Africa. It contains the type and only known species T. imperforatus. Thliptosaurus is from the upper Daptocephalus Assemblage Zone, making it one of the youngest Permian dicynodonts known, living just prior to the Permian mass extinction. It also represents one of the few small bodied dicynodonts to exist at this time, when most other dicynodonts had large body sizes and many small dicynodonts (such as Diictodon) had gone extinct. The unexpected discovery of Thliptosaurus in a region of the Karoo outside of the historically sampled localities suggests that it may have been part of an endemic local fauna not found in these historic sites. Such under-sampled localities may contain 'hidden diversities' of Permian faunas that are unknown from traditional samples. Thliptosaurus is also unusual for dicynodonts as it lacks a pineal foramen, suggesting that it played a much less important role in thermoregulation than it did for other dicynodonts.

While the name literally translates to "compressed lizard", referring to the severely crushed and flattened skull of the only known specimen, it also alludes to the Biblical thlipsis, a time of tribulation and hardship preceding the End Times, alluding to the existence of Thliptosaurus just before the mass extinction at the end of the Permian, also known as the Great Dying.

== Description ==
Thliptosaurus was a small dicynodont (skull length of only 8.6 centimetres (3.4 in) long), but it displays several characteristics indicative of maturity in dicynodonts. Only the skull is known, but like other related dicynodonts it would have been a squat, sprawling quadruped with a short tail and a large head with a tortoise-like beak. Thliptosaurus appears completely toothless, lacking even in the distinctive tusks found in some other dicynodonts (including the closely related Dicynodontoides), although teeth may be obscured by the lower jaw if they are present. The post cranial skeleton is unknown, but probably resembled that of other kingoriids, such as Kombuisia.

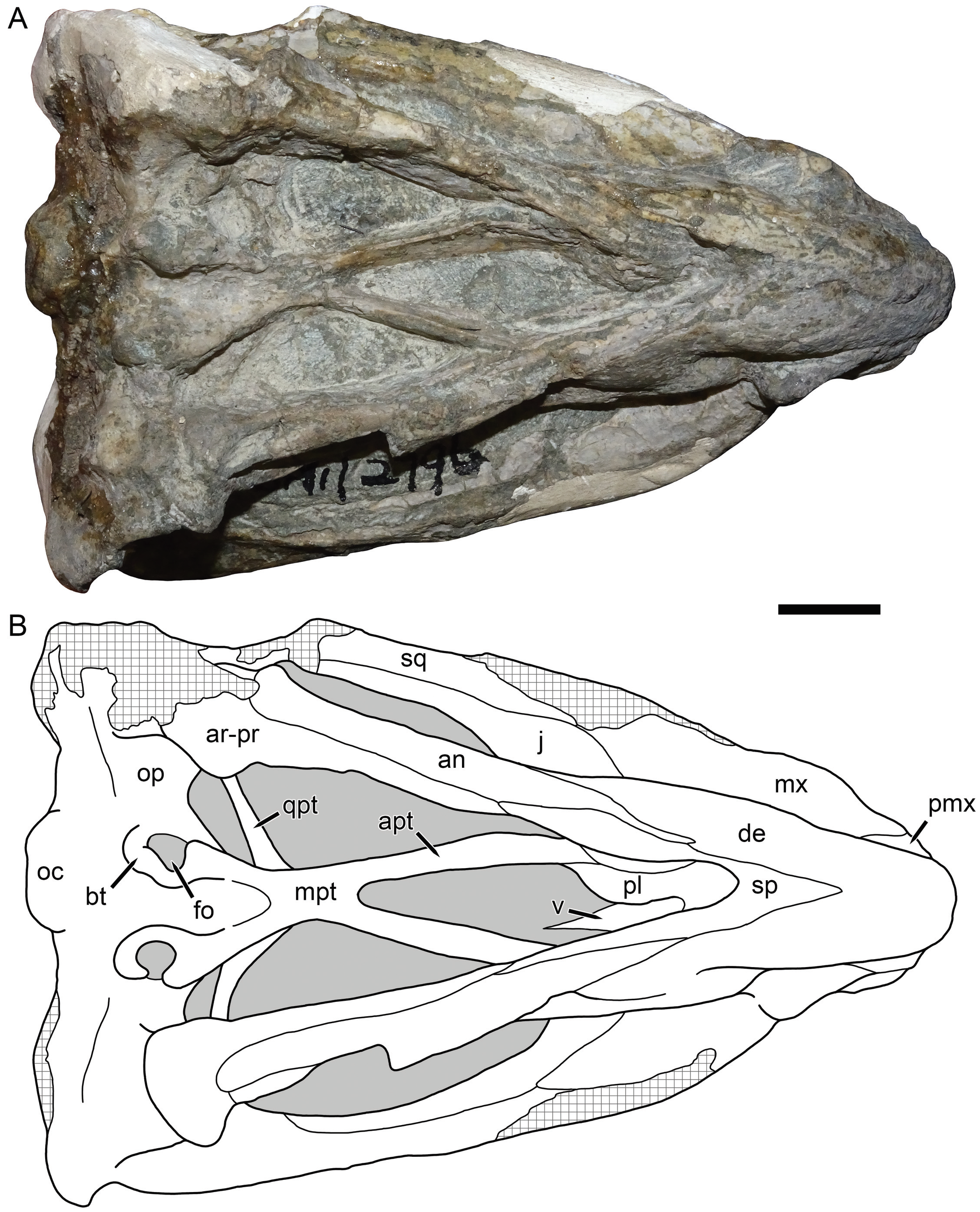
Skull of Thliptosaurus viewed from underneath (ventrally), showing the palate.

=== Skull ===
The skull of Thliptosaurus is fairly typical for dicynodonts, being broad at the back with very large temporal fenestrae, with a much shorter snout that gently tapers to a blunt point. The nostrils aren't visible on the specimen, meaning they must have been placed on the very front of the snout facing forwards, and not on the sides. The tuskless caniniform process of the maxilla is prominent and sits well forward of the eyes. The front margin of the caniniform process is long and slopes gently downwards from the front, while the back margin rises steeply up to meet with the zygomatic arch below the eyes. The caniniform process is similar to that of Dicynodontoides, but is lacking the tusks found in that genus. No other teeth are visible on the specimen, but as much of the maxilla is covered by the lower jaw it is impossible to be sure. The nasal bones sport three prominent well-pitted bosses with a rough, rugose texture. These bosses resemble those of Dicynodontoides, with two flaring laterally over the front of the snout, split by the single fused premaxilla, and meeting with a third medial boss behind them.

The intertemporal region, or bar, is unusually wide for a kingoriid, composed of the broad frontal bones in the front and the flat exposed parietal bones behind them, each contacting with the single preparietal (a unique bone found in dicynodonts and some other therapsids) just behind the eyes. Very unusually for a dicynodont, Thliptosaurus has no visible pineal foramen, and the suture between the parietals appears uninterrupted for their whole length. Even if the parietal foramen existed and was obscured by deformation during fossilisation, it would have to have existed as a very thin slit between the parietals that did not contact the preparietal, which itself would be a highly unusual condition for a dicynodont. However, comparisons with other kingoriids indicate that the absence of the pineal foramen is likely a genuine feature.

Unfortunately, the palate is mostly obscured by the tightly occluded lower jaw, leaving only the pterygoids and the basicranium (the part of the skull underneath the braincase) readily visible. The pterygoids are relatively long and narrow, and straight for much of their length like those of Compsodon and Dicynodontoides. The two pterygoids meet at a median pterygoid plate positioned relatively far back on the skull, which also results in the rami that contact the quadrate being angled at approximately 60 degrees to the skull's long axis. The occiput is poorly preserved and few details can be discerned, but the overall structure appears typical for dicynodonts, as is the basicranium.

=== Mandible ===
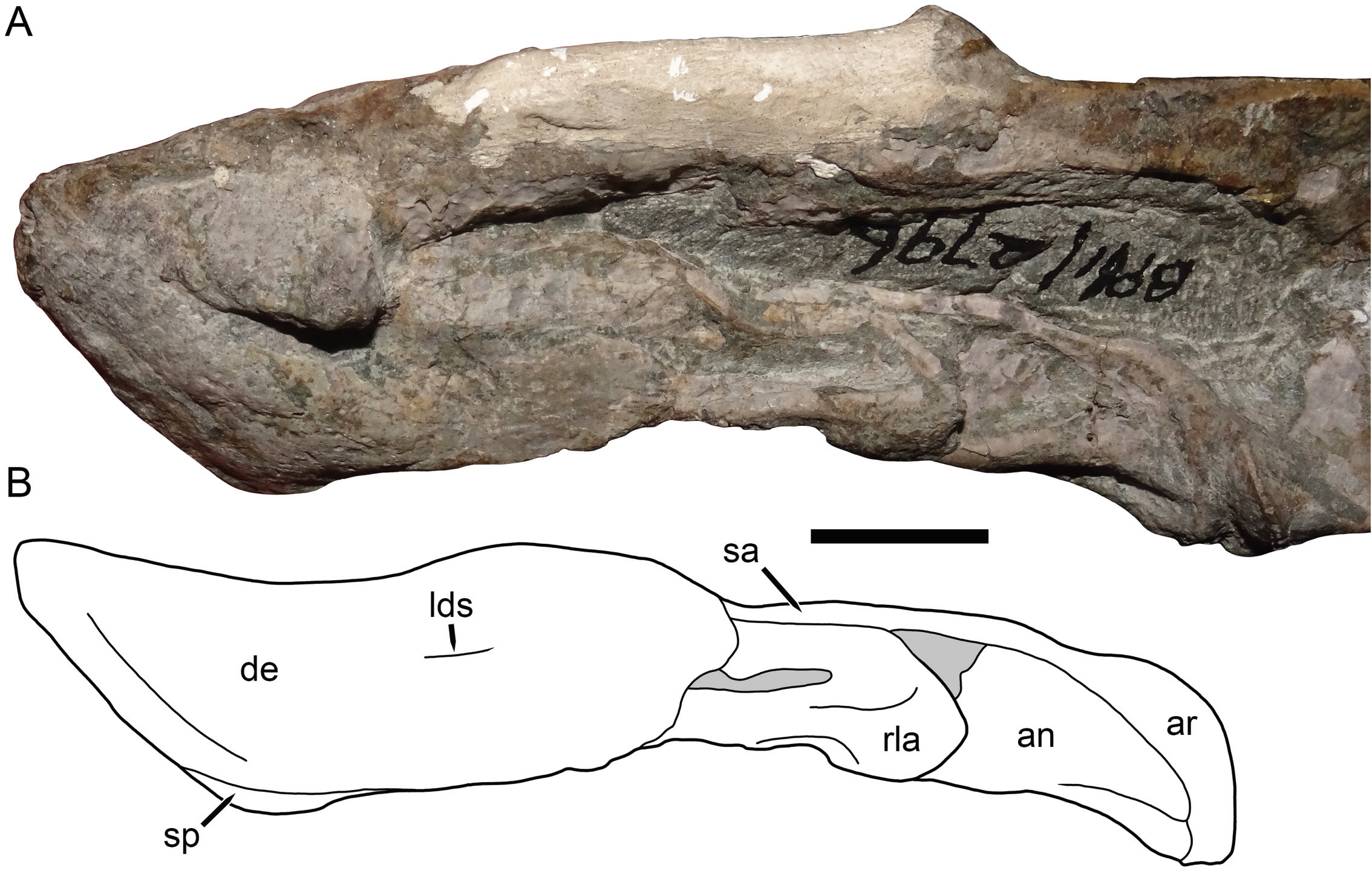
Thliptosaurus skull with diagram isolating the mandible.

The mandibular symphysis of the dentaries is long, creating a long, flattened shovel-like beak tip. The rest of the jaws is otherwise roughly v-shaped, as is typical for dicynodonts. The dentary has a tall plate on its sides that obscures the external mandibular fenestra, an unusual condition amongst dicynodonts. The coronoid process (a site for jaw muscle attachment) is unusually short compared to that of other kingoriids. The dentary also has a short horizontal shelf about halfway up its side, representing a greatly reduced lateral dentary shelf (a site of attachment for the external lateral adductor, an important jaw muscle in dicynodont feeding). The reflected lamina of the angular is relatively short, surrounded by a concave lateral exposure on each side. The articular has a curved, convex upper surface that contacts the condyles of the quadrate and extends beyond them, facilitating palinal (backwards) motion of the lower jaw, typical of dicynodonts.

=== Ontogeny ===
The small size of Thliptosaurus, combined with the taphonomic distortion and ontogenetic variability of some of its characteristic traits raised the possibility that the only known specimen of Thliptosaurus actually represented the juvenile of an unknown larger bodied animal, possibly even that of the contemporaneous kingoriid Dicynodontoides. However, three traits typical of mature, fully grown dicynodonts were identified in the specimen. The snout is well ossified and fused together, with none of the irregular sutures observed in the juveniles of larger dicynodont species. There is no sign of a postfrontal bone, which is interpreted as fusing with the postorbital bone during ontogeny in other dicynodonts. Thirdly, the preparietal is small relative to the size of skull, unlike the large preparietal found in juvenile dicynodonts. These traits indicate that the holotype of Thliptosaurus is not a juvenile of a larger taxon, despite its small size, and represents a mature, small bodied dicynodont.

== History of discovery ==
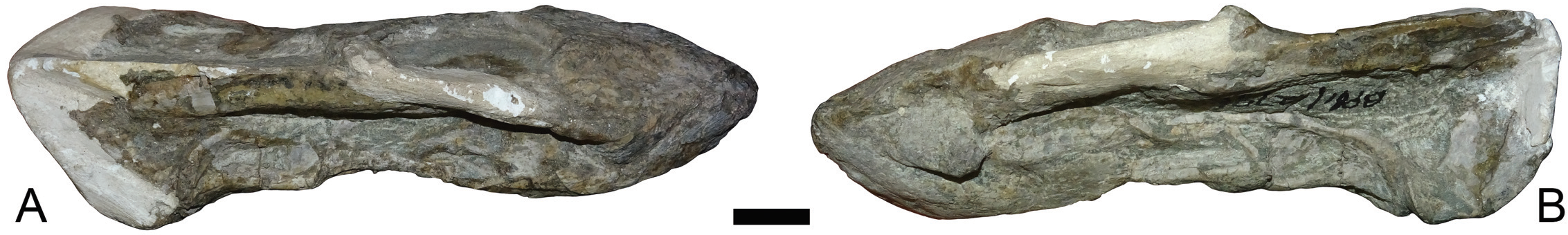
Skull of Thliptosaurus in lateral views highlighting the severity of the dorsoventral crushing.

The holotype and only known specimen of Thliptosaurus, BP/1/2796, was discovered and collected by palaeontologist James Kitching in September, 1958 on an expedition at Stoffelton in western KwaZulu-Natal, near the town of Bulwer. This site records exposures of the Permian Daptocephalus Assemblage Zone (AZ) and Triassic Lystrosaurus Assemblage Zone across the Permo-Triassic boundary, and while of scientific importance has been relatively unexplored and under-sampled compared to more historically recognised localities in the Karoo Basin. Indeed, much of the specimens from this site were collected by Kitching himself, and many of them remain as yet unprepared and unstudied. The fossil can be recognised as belonging to the Permian Daptocephalus AZ by the light grey colour of the fossil bones and grey siltstone matrix surrounding them (contrasted with the yellow bones and red matrix of Triassic fossils). The specimen was not described until 2019 by palaeontologist Christian Kammerer, who diagnosed it as its own new distinct genus of dicynodont. The holotype is held in the collections of the Evolutionary Studies Institute at the University of the Witwatersrand, Johannesburg in South Africa.

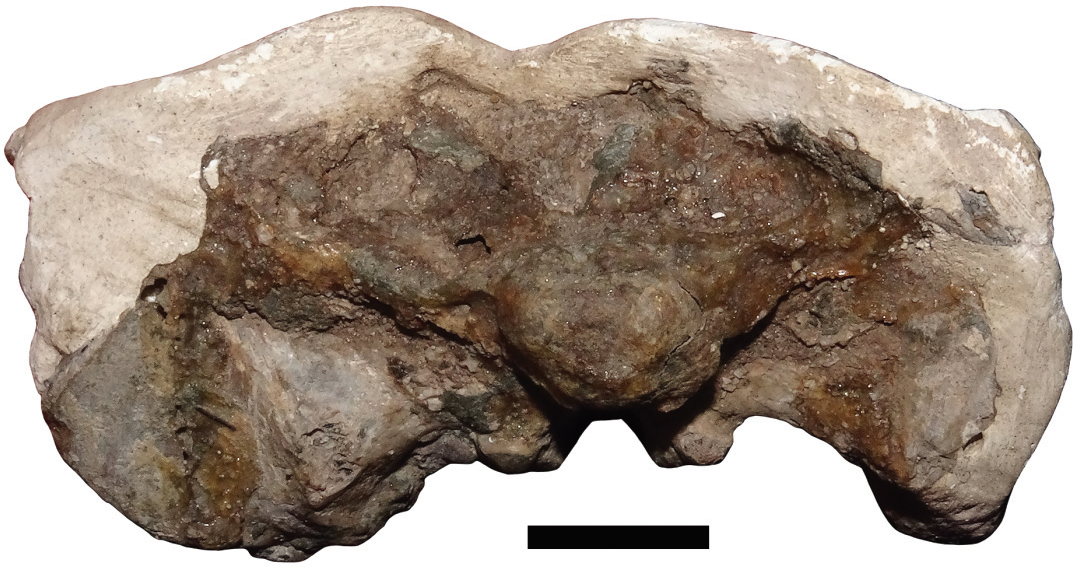
Thliptosaurus skull viewed from behind, clearly showing the areas reconstructed with plaster.

The single skull of Thliptosaurus is nearly complete, but it has been severely crushed and flattened from top-to-bottom (dorsoventrally), and some broken areas of bone at the back of the skull have been restored using plaster. Details and sutures on the top of the skull are readily visible, but poor preservation and over-preparation have obliterated features on the sides and rear of the skull. The lower jaw is firmly occluded to the upper jaw, obscuring some details of the sides of the skull and many of the palate.

The generic name is from the Ancient Greek θλῖψις (Latinzed as thlipsis) and σαῦρος (Latinized as saurus), literally translated to mean "compressed lizard", referring to the flattened nature of the skull from being severely dorsoventrally compressed during fossilisation. The name also alludes to the Biblical thlipsis, the name given to a period of great tribulations accompanying the End Times, as a play on the taxon's existence just before the Permian mass extinction, also known as the Great Dying. The specific name is from the Latin imperforatus, meaning "unpunctured", referring to the greatly reduced pineal foramen in the roof of the skull, if it is not entirely absent altogether.

== Classification ==
Thliptosaurus was found to be a member of the clade Emydopoidea in the family Kingoriidae, closely related to the genera Kombuisia and Dicynodontoides. Thliptosaurus shares with other kingoriids a dentary plate that occludes and obscures the mandibular fenestra, an arcing anterior process of the lacrimal that contacts the nasal, cutting off the maxilla from contacting the prefrontal bone, and an absence of the postfrontal bone (also shared with other kistecephalians). It shares an extremely reduced pineal foramen with the kingoriid Kombuisia frerensis and cistecephalid Kawingasaurus. However, it is distinguished from these genera by having a moderately broad intertemporal bar, intermediate in width between that of Kombuisia and Kawingasaurus. The intertemporal bar also has broad, flat exposures of the parietals, a primitive trait for dicynodonts but that has been lost in other kingoriids. A phylogenetic analysis using the latest iteration of the data matrix from Kammerer (2018), itself modified from Angielcyzk & Kammerer (2017), agreed with this interpretation. A simplified excerpt of the consensus tree from this analysis, focused in on the relationships of Emydopoidea, is shown in the cladogram below:

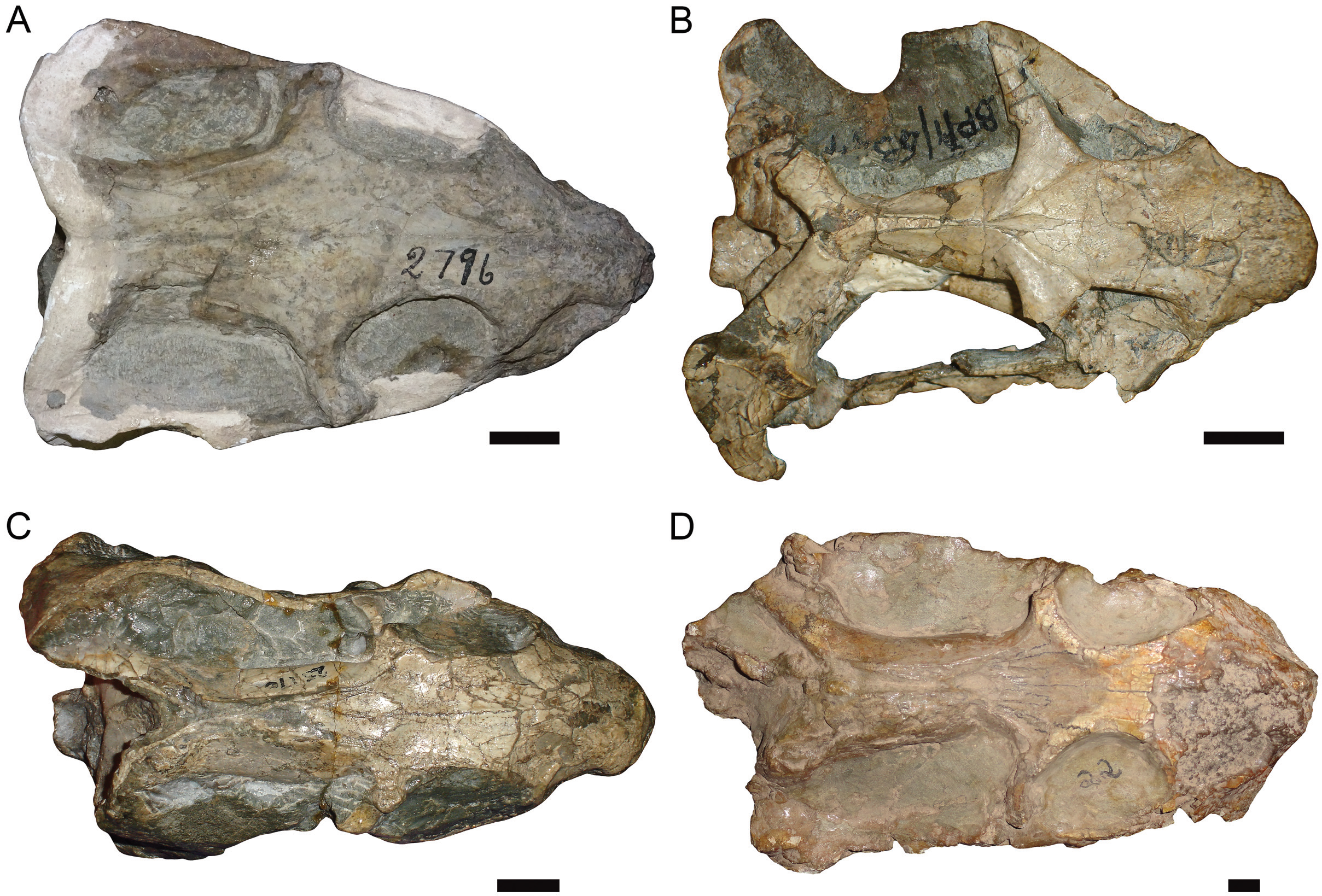
Comparison of the skulls of Thliptosaurus (top left) to other kingoriids Kombuisia (top right) and Dicynodontoides (bottom row).

- Therochelonia
  - Bidentalia
  - Endothiodontia
    - Pristerodon
    - - Brachyprosopus
      - - - Niassodon
          - Endothiodon
        - Emydopoidea
          - - Emydops
            - Compsodon
          - - Digalodon
            - - - Myosaurus
                - Kingoriidae
                  - Thliptosaurus
                  - - Dicynodontoides
                    - Kombuisia
              - - Sauroscaptor
                - - Cistecephalus microrhinus
                  - - Cistecephalus boonstrai
                    - Kawingasaurus

Kammerer noted that the recovery of Myosaurus as the sister taxon to Kingoriidae was unusual, as it is usually recovered as a close relative of Cistecephalus. However, the support for this relationship was low, and so he did not regard this result with much significance. Similarly, the analysis recovered an 'expansive Endothiodontia', including several taxa not normally recovered in this clade, such as Pristerodon and Endothiodontidae, as successive outgroups to Emdyopoidea, but the support for this was also low. Otherwise, the analysis recovered a generally similar topology to other recent analyses of this data matrix.

=== Taxonomic distinction ===
The small, crushed nature of the sole specimen of Thliptosaurus raised the possibility that it may belong to an existing genus, and the seemingly unique features are just taphonomic. The skull of Thliptosaurus was compared to similarly sized and crushed specimens of the other kingoriids Kombuisia and Dicynodontoides, the latter of which co-existed with Thliptosaurus. However, even when crushed flat, Thliptosaurus could be distinguished from the other two kingoriids by the greater width of the intertemporal bar, and the parietals remained obscured postorbitals in the other taxa while they are exposed in Thliptosaurus. The pineal foramen was also still readily identifiable in the other kingoriid specimens, as would be expected for dorsoventral crushing. This implies that the characteristic broad temporal bar and absent pineal foramen of Thliptosaurus were not simply the result of taphonomic distortion, and are indeed genuine diagnostic characteristics of a distinct kingoriid taxon.

== Palaeobiology ==
=== Loss of the pineal foramen ===
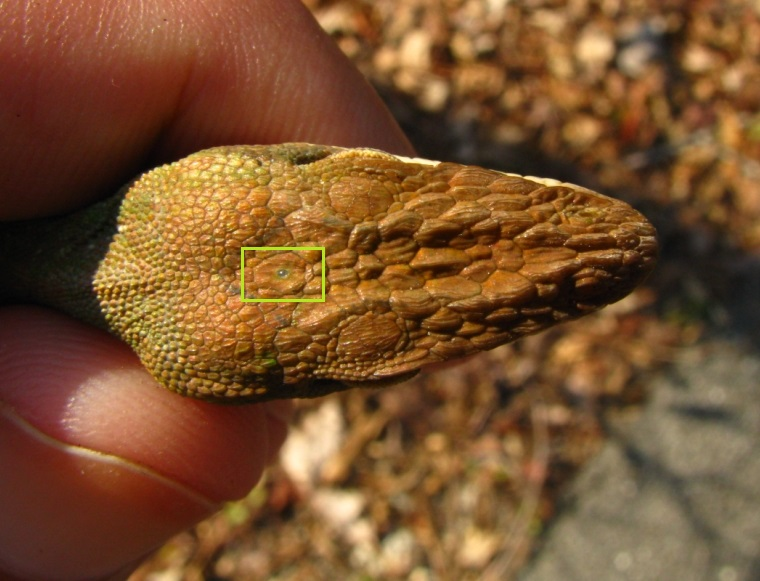
Pineal eye of the modern Carolina anole.

The seemingly total absence of the pineal foramen in Thliptosaurus is very unusual for dicynodonts, and it has otherwise only been recorded in the related kingoriid Kombuisia frerensis and cistecephalid Kawingasaurus (although its presence or absence is rarely intraspecifically variable in some other dicynodonts). The pineal foramen, supporting a pineal gland and pineal "third" eye is suggested to have played a role in thermoregulation for dicynodonts, allowing them to register changes in light levels throughout the day and yearly seasonal changes that would allow them respond and modify thermoregulatory behaviours, such as basking, as is recorded in modern tuataras and some lizards. The absence of the pineal complex in Thliptosaurus then suggests it was playing a less important role in thermoregulation, if any at all, although the reasons for this are unclear. The independent loss of the pineal foramen in advanced therocephalians and cynodonts across the Permo-Triassic boundary has been suggested to be a consequence of developing endothermic (i.e. warm blooded) metabolisms, something inferred not to have occurred in the contemporary dicynodonts or gorgonopsians.

The independent loss of the pineal foramen in Thliptosaurus and other kistecephalian dicynodonts may support an alternative hypothesis for the loss of the pineal foramen in therapsids. It's possible that changing global environmental conditions at the end of the Permian, such as global warming and the movement of the continents towards the equator, meant that less control was needed over thermoregulation in therapsids like Thliptosaurus, decreasing the need for the pineal foramen until it was ultimately lost. This is similar to some modern tropical lizards, which have much reduced pineal eyes as they do not need to regulate their body temperature as well as lizards in more seasonal and temperate environments. These changes to therapsid thermoregulation influenced by the environment may then be more important to the acquisition of endothermy in mammal evolution than sometimes presumed.

== Palaeoecology ==
=== Late Permian small dicynodonts ===
Thliptosaurus was one of the few small-bodied dicynodonts (i.e. those with a skull length >15 cm) present in the latest Permian just before the Permian mass extinction, as they had suffered a major decline in diversity after their success in the earlier Middle to early-Late Permian. Small dicynodonts went from being over three times as numerous as all other tetrapods combined in the Tropidostoma Assemblage Zone (primarily in the form of Diictodon) to down to only 19.2% of total tetrapods in the lower Daptocephalus Assemblage Zone (AZ), and then to just 4% by the upper Daptocephalus AZ when Thliptosaurus had appeared. At the same time, larger species of dicynodonts were on the increase, occupying up to 64% of all tetrapods in the upper Daptocephalus AZ. The newly evolved Lystrosaurus in particular was especially abundant at 34% of the total. The presence of a previously unknown small dicynodont in the Upper Daptocephalus AZ then is surprising.

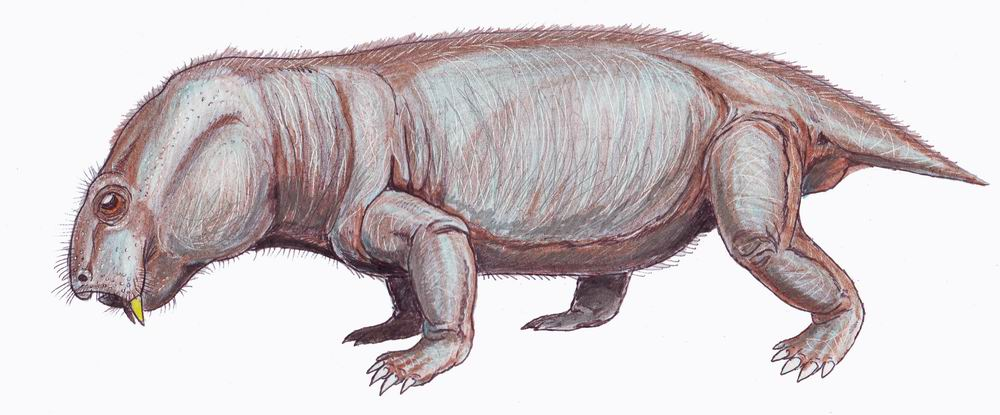
Restoration of the contemporary and related small dicynodont Dicynodontoides.

Despite their decline, small dicynodonts still survived the Permian mass extinction, as evidenced by the kingoriid Kombuisia and myosaurid Myosaurus from Antarctica and South Africa. Both were present during the Induan of the Early Triassic, but while Myosaurus perished shortly after Kombuisia persisted into the earliest Anisian of the Middle Triassic. The ancestor-descendant relationships of these small dicynodonts to those of the Permian is unclear, but they do not appear to be directly related to any known Permian species. It has been suggested that the ancestors of the small Triassic dicynodonts (as well as the successful Triassic Kannemeyeriiformes) must have been present outside of the well-sampled historical localities of the Karoo Basin. The discovery of Thliptosaurus may support this idea, as it could indicate that local, endemic second-order faunas existed amongst the more widespread well known faunas of the Daptocephalus AZ. More crucially, it suggests that such 'missing diversities' may be present even in the under-sampled localities of otherwise historically important regions like the Karoo Basin.

=== KwaZulu-Natal palaeoenvironment ===
The environment of the upper Daptocephalus Assemblage Zone has been interpreted as well-drained floodplains, with a lower water table than the preceding wetter lower Daptocephalus AZ. This may have reduced the inferred marginal river and low undergrowth habitats that small dicynodonts are thought to have preferred, leading to their decline. Favourable habitats for small dicynodonts must have still existed, including in KwaZulu-Natal, as evidenced by Thliptosaurus. In KwaZulu-Natal, Thliptosaurus co-existed with other more widespread fauna typical of the Daptocephalus AZ, namely the dicynodonts Daptocephalus itself and Lystrosaurus. It also at least co-existed with the smaller dicynodont Kwazulusaurus, which may represent another local endemic dicynodont species from KwaZulu-Natal (however, it's possibly a synonym of Lystrosaurus), as well as the large predatory therocephalian Moschorhinus. Other therapsids known from elsewhere in the latest upper Daptocephalus AZ include the larger dicynodonts Oudenodon, Pelanomodon and Dinanomodon, the therocephalian Promoschorhynchus and remains of gorgonopsians.
