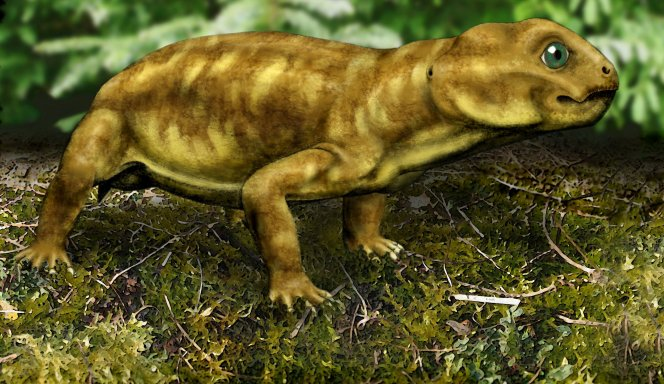
- Restoration of the emydopoid Myosaurus gracilis

Scientific classification
- Domain: Eukaryota
- Kingdom: Animalia
- Phylum: Chordata
- Clade: Synapsida
- Clade: Therapsida
- Suborder: †Anomodontia
- Clade: †Dicynodontia
- Clade: †Therochelonia
- Superfamily: †Emydopoidea; Cluver and King, 1983

Subgroups
- Digalodon; Rastodon; Thliptosaurus; Cistecephalidae; Emydopidae; Kingoriidae; Myosauridae

= Emydopoidea =

Emydopoidea Temporal range: Late Permian - Middle Triassic

Extinct superfamily of dicynodonts

Emydopoidea is a group of Late Permian dicynodont therapsids. It includes the small-bodied Emydops, Myosaurus, and kingoriids, and the burrowing cistecephalids.

== Phylogeny ==
Below is a cladogram modified from Macungo et al. (2022) showing the phylogenetic relationships of emydopoids:

- Emydopoidea
  - Rastodon
  - - Kingoriidae
      - Dicynodontoides
      - Kombuisia
    - - Thliptosaurus
      - - Digalodon
        - - Emydopidae
            - Compsodon
            - Emydops
          - Kistecephalia
            - Myosauridae
              Myosaurus
            - Cistecephalidae
              - Sauroscaptor
              - - Kembawacela
                - - Cistecephalus
                  - - Cistecephaloides
                    - Kawingasaurus
