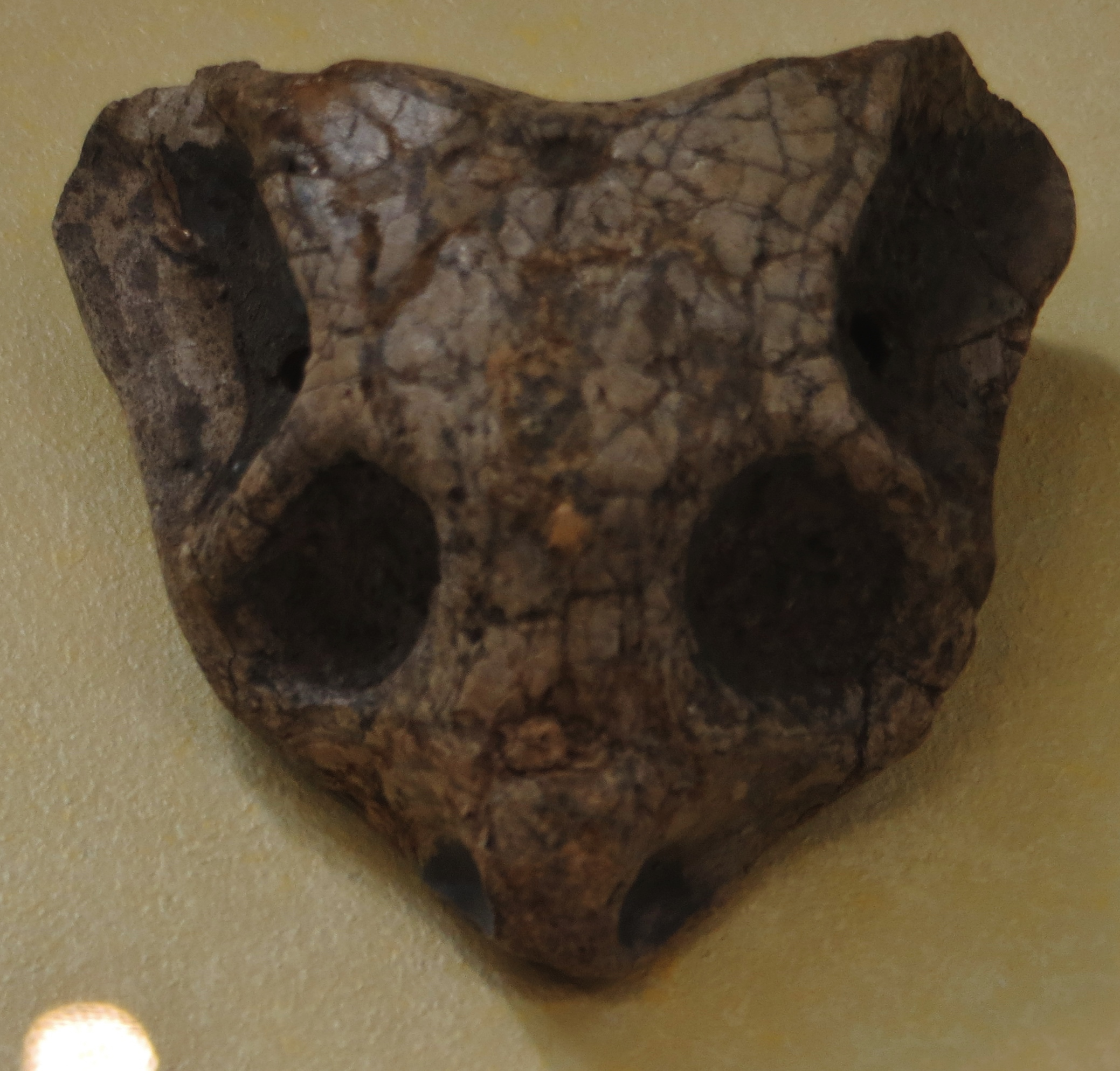
- Skull in front view, Natural History Museum, Bonn University

Scientific classification
- Kingdom: Animalia
- Phylum: Chordata
- Clade: Synapsida
- Clade: Therapsida
- Clade: †Anomodontia
- Clade: †Dicynodontia
- Family: †Cistecephalidae
- Genus: †Cistecephalus; Owen, 1876

Type species
- †Cistecephalus microrhinus Owen, 1876

= Cistecephalus =

Cistecephalus Temporal range: Wuchiapingian, 259.8–254.1 Ma

Extinct genus of dicynodonts

Cistecephalus is an extinct genus of dicynodont therapsid from the Late Permian of southern Africa (South Africa and Zambia). It was a small, specialised, burrowing dicynodont, possibly with habits similar to a modern mole. The head was flattened and wedge-shaped, the body long, and the forelimbs very strong, with similarities in structure to the forelimb of modern burrowing mammals.

Cistecephalus appears to have been endemic to the Karoo Basin of South Africa. It is most common in the Cistecephalus Assemblage Zone, in which it dominates the fauna, and is also found in the slightly older Tropidostoma Assemblage Zone.

It was one of the first genera of dicynodonts to be described, by Richard Owen, in 1876.

Cistecephalus could reach up to 60 centimetres (24 in) in length.

== Description ==
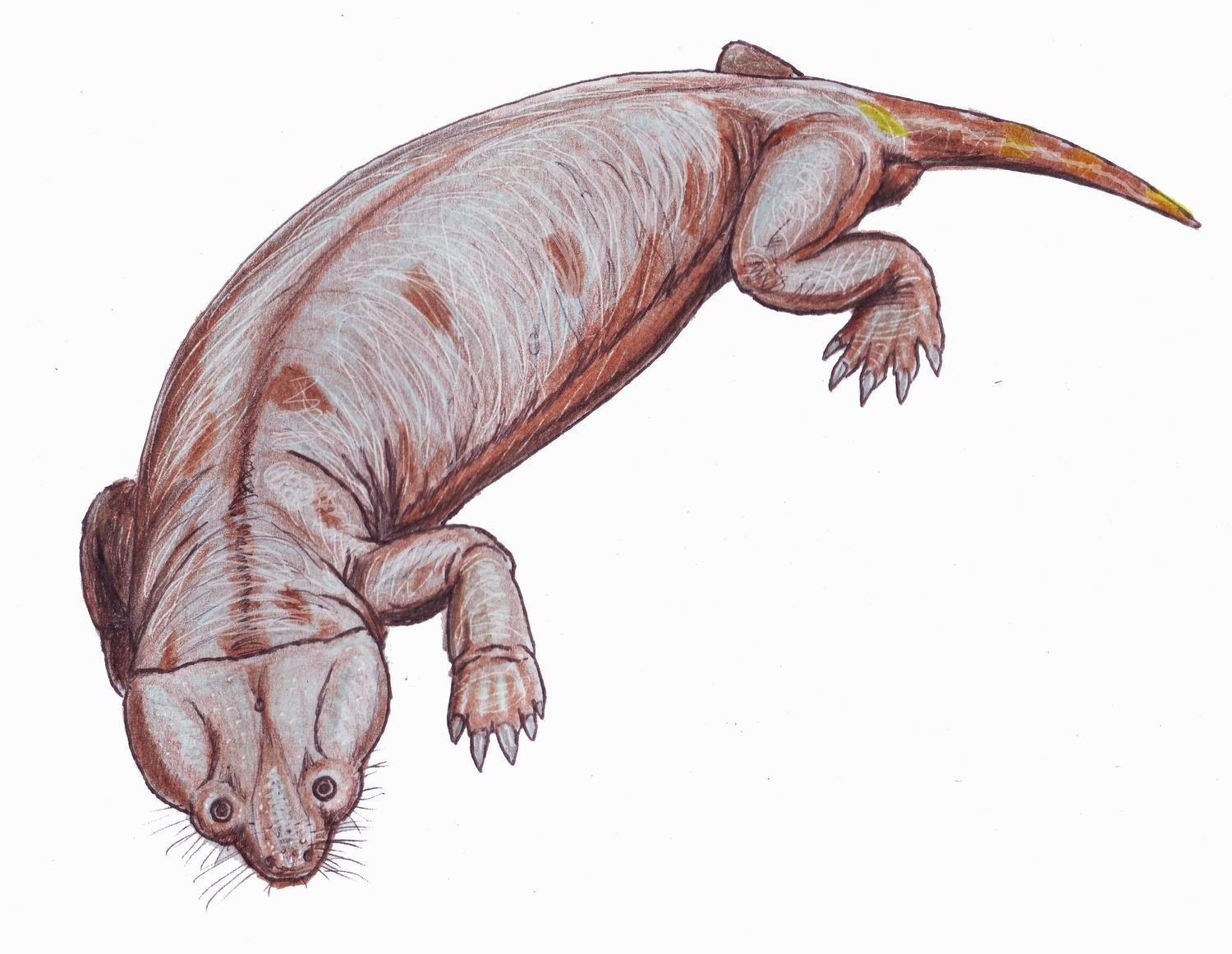
Restoration

Cistecephalus was one of the most atypical dicynodont genera. However, it was broadly similar in anatomy to other cistecephalids, all of which share similar adaptations to digging. Its skull was broad, with laterally-directed temporal openings and a sharply tapering snout, similar to extant fossorial animals. However, it has relatively large, anteriorly-directed orbits, suggesting binocular vision. It had a short neck and laterally-directed shoulder joint. Its forelimbs were short and powerfully built, and its manus were broad, with fused phalanges. Its hind limbs were flexible and probably could be used to move soil out of the way.

== History ==
Cistecephalus was one of the first dicynodont genera named, and it has had numerous species assigned to it, but only the type species is considered valid today. Most of these invalid species were incorrectly identified as distinct due to taphonomic differences as well as ontogenetic change and sexual dimorphism. The biology of Cistecephalus has been interpreted in various ways, due to its rather unusual morphology. Both aquatic and arboreal lifestyles have been suggested, but since 1978, the consensus has been that it was fossorial. Some fossils of a cistecephalid from the Kundaram Formation of India were regarded as belonging to Cistecephalus, but have since been assigned to a separate genus, Sauroscaptor.

Cistecephalus is derived from the Greek words κίστη ("box") and κεφαλή ("head"), and was spelled Kistecephalus until emended by Richard Lydekker in 1890. The name is a reference to the boxy shape of its skull.

=== Species ===
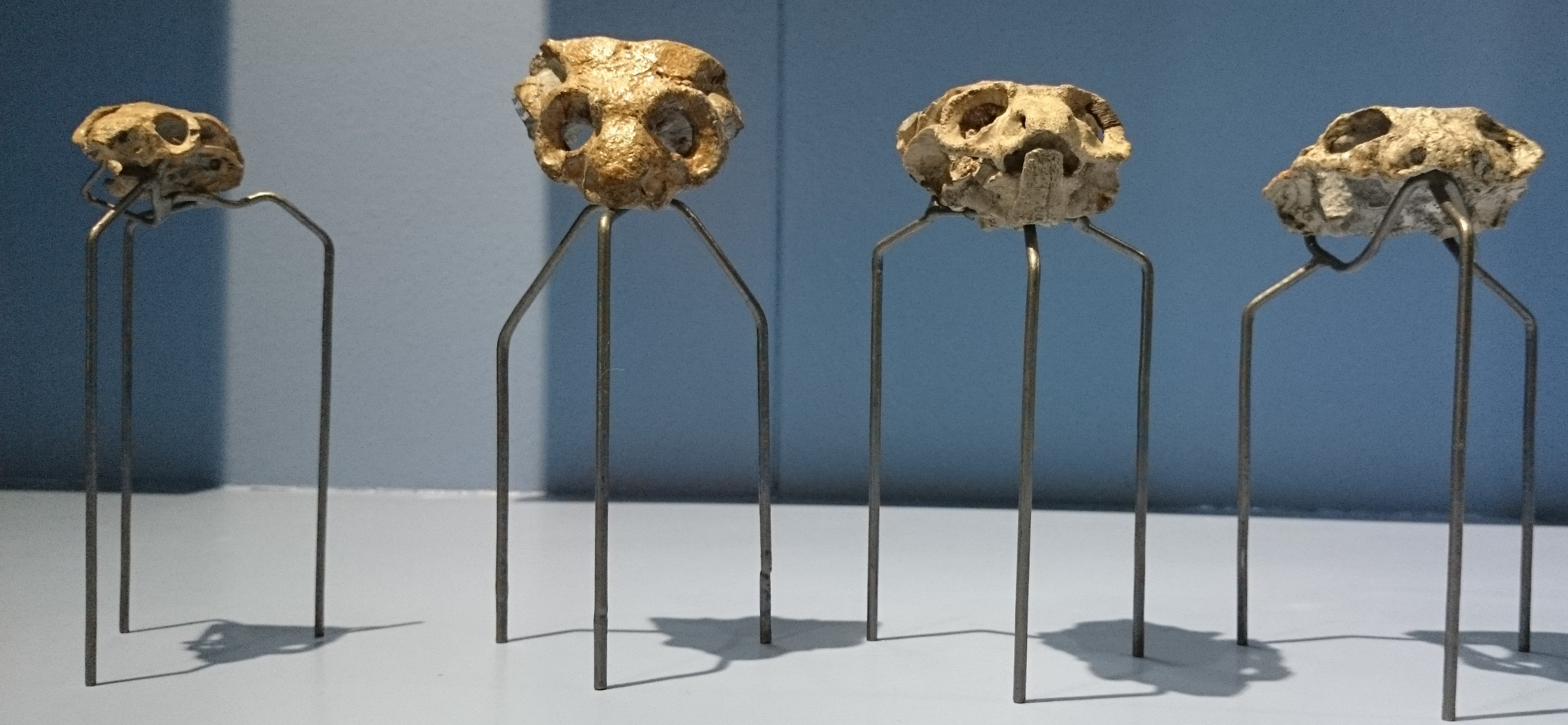
Skulls in Iziko Museum

Cistecephalus has had many species assigned to it, most of which are now considered junior synonyms of the type species. Richard Owen named six species when he erected the genus in 1876, of which C. microrhinus is considered the type.

- Cistecephalus microrhinus is the type species of Cistecephalus and the only species currently considered valid.
- Cistecephalus leptorhinus was one of the six original species of the genus. This species is a nomen dubium which has long been assigned to Dicynodon as well as being made the type species of its own genus, Baiopsis. It is potentially a synonym of Diictodon feliceps.
- Cistecephalus chelydroides was one of the six original species of the genus.
- Cistecephalus planiceps was one of the six original species of the genus.
- Cistecephalus arctatus was one of the six original species of the genus. It has been transferred to the genus Emydops, and is one of the two valid species in that genus.
- Cistecephalus bathygnathus was one of the six original species of the genus.
- Cistecephalus angusticeps was named by Robert Broom in 1932. It is a junior synonym of C. microrhinus.
- Cistecephalus major was named by Robert Broom in 1948. It is a junior synonym of C. microrhinus.
- Cistecephalus platyfrons was named by Robert Broom in 1948. It is a junior synonym of C. microrhinus.
- Cistecephalus rubidgei was named by Robert Broom in 1948. It is a junior synonym of C. microrhinus.
- Cistecephalus laticeps was named by A. S. Brink in 1950.

== Classification ==
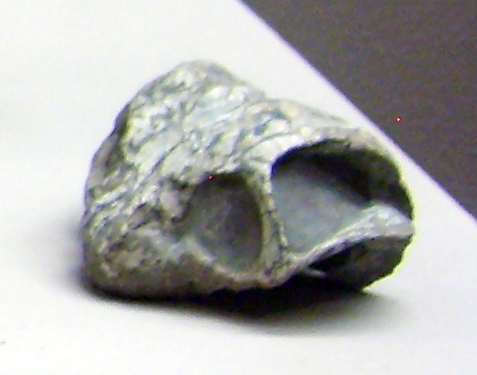
Skull in side view, Museum für Naturkunde, Berlin

Cistecephalus is the type genus of Cistecephalidae, a clade of emydopoid dicynodonts known from southern Africa and India. Cistecephalids are among the most strongly-supported clades within Dicynodontia.

Cladogram showing the phylogenetic position of Cistecephalus.

- - - Pylaecephalidae
      - Diictodon
      - - Eosimops
        - - Prosictodon
          - Robertia
    - Emydopoidea
      - Emydopidae
        Emydops
      - Kistecephalia
        - Kingoriidae
          - Dicynodontoides
          - Kombuisia
        - - Digalodon
          - - Myosauridae
              Myosaurus
            - Cistecephalidae
              - Sauroscaptor
              - - Cistecephalus
                - - Cistecephaloides
                  - Kawingasaurus
  - Bidentalia
