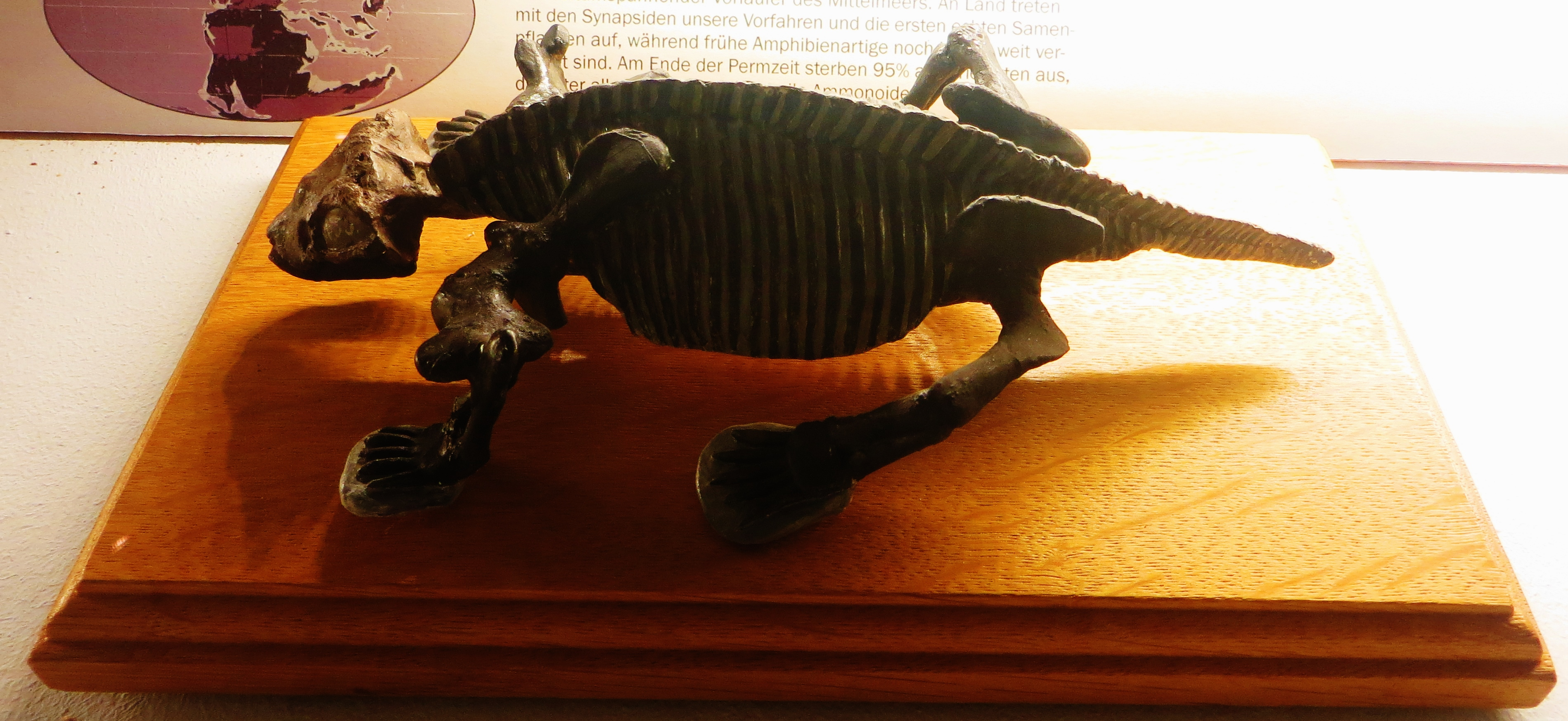
- Skeleton

Scientific classification
- Kingdom: Animalia
- Phylum: Chordata
- Clade: Synapsida
- Clade: Therapsida
- Clade: †Anomodontia
- Clade: †Dicynodontia
- Family: †Cistecephalidae
- Genus: †Kawingasaurus; Cox, 1972

Type species
- Kawingasaurus fossilis Cox, 1972

= Kawingasaurus =

Kawingasaurus Temporal range: Late Permian ~259–254 Ma

Extinct genus of dicynodonts

Kawingasaurus is an extinct genus of dicynodont therapsid from the Late Permian Usili Formation of Tanzania. It is a member of the family Cistecephalidae, and like other cistecephalids it is thought to have been fossorial. It is a member of the family Cistecephalidae. Cistephalidae includes genera Cisteceohalus, Cistecephaloides and Kawingasaurus. Greek for Saurus meaning "lizard" appears as a suffix denoting a reptilian origin. Living between 254.17 and 259.9 million years ago in the late Permian and believed to have the first and last recorded appearance in this time period. It lived in deep burrows as a suggested by most burrowing dicynodonts from evaluation of cranial sutures, vestibule inflation and enlarged stapes foot plates which are thought to be functionally correlated with bone-conduction hearing; all observed in fossorial vertebrates which use seismic signals as communication.

== History of discovery ==
Dicynodontoides was very briefly first described by Sir Richard Owen in his catalog of fossil reptilia in 1876. He described them as being "a very peculiar family of reptiles from the Trias of South Africa with a remarkable skull and a single pair of huge sharp-pointed tusks growing downward." Owen described these singular animals to have no other kind of teeth except for a beak-like mouth. At least 13 specimens were referred to C. microrhinus and C. Planiceps were not described in detail to provide photos or museum numbers for them. A first detailed description of these fossils was provided by von Huene (1942) who mentioned notable differences of characteristics of Cistecephalus such as smaller orbits, smaller sized skulls and a flattened snout region despite ascribing the fossils to Cistepahlus planiceps (now considered a junior synonym of C. microrhinus).

In 1936, seven skulls, parts of the vertebrae, a mandible, ribs and parts of the girdles were excavated by German geologist Ernst Nowack and his wife Maria Nowack on an expedition in the Ruhuhu area of Southwest Tanzania. The fossils were preserved as a part of Nowack's collection in the Institut und Museum fur Geologic and Paläontologie der Universitat Tubingen (GPIT No. U 31). Later, in 1972 Cox investigated the fossils and found further differences between Cistephalus and the excavated skulls. A tapering shape of the skull in lateral and dorsal view, slenderness of the zygomatic arches, and anterior extension of the squamosal to meet the maxilla led to Cox establishing the new genus and species, since Owen's initial description of the group in 1876, K. fossilis due to significant evidence of distinct differences from Cistecephalus.

== Paleoenvironmental Information ==
Kawingsaurus Fossils were discovered in the Usili Formation which was a late Permian geologic formation in Tanzania. British geologist G. M. Stockely first studied this formation and the fossils within in 1932 and divided it into units labeled K1-K8. Later in 1957, paleontologist Alan J. Charig discovered more fossils and renamed the K6 unit the Kawinga Formation. Since then it has been renamed the Usili Formation. Kawingasaurus fossilis' locality was found in Kingori of the Arusha Region of Tanzania. The material found for Kawingasauerus at this site included UT K 52, skull and dentary; UT K 56, skull; UT K 55, 5 skulls and post crania.

== Description ==
While the size of Kawingasaurus specimen is not explicitly mentioned, Cistecephalus could reach up to 60 centimeters in length. Kawingasaurus is a relatively small dicynodont with a described "unusual" postcranial anatomy. In 1972, Cox's investigation led to the discovery that the humerus and scapulocoracoid were very massive, stout and extremely twisted. Like most digging vertebrates, the forelimbs are much more broad than the hind limbs and have enlarged digits. A great interest was taken in the skull and hearing apparatus of Kawingasaurus to gain insight into adaptations for fossorial lifestyle. In particular, the inner ear, stapes, mandible, quadrate-quadratojugal complex was analyzed in preserved K. Fossilis specimen. Cox came to the conclusion that Kawingasaurus was likely adapted to a fossorial lifestyle. An almost complete skull of K. fossilis (inventory number GPIT/RE/9272) and the mandible (inventory number GPIT/RE/9274) was measured from the tip of the snout to the condyles at 40.5 mm in length. The width of the skull in the occipital region was measured at 37.0 mm.

Underground fossorial animals are sensitive to low-frequency sound and have modifications to their auditory components compared to terrestrial species. The volume of the vestibule relative to the size of K. fossilis proved to be very inflated at 182.00 mm^3 compared to other nonmammalian synapsids. According to Cox (1962) and Olsen (1944), the vestibule of the inner ear for "typical anomodonts us described as elongated and slender whereas the vestibule of the inner ear found in Kawingasaurus is extremely inflated with an ellipsoidal shape. The inner ears occupy most of the space of the caudal region of the skull. It was also found that Kawingasaurus has enlarged stapes footplates (measured at 13.91 mm^2) thought to be correlated with bone-conduction hearing observed in fossorial vertebrates. The triangular head as well as spatulate snout was likely used for digging and seismic signal detection by tapping against tunnel walls for perception of sound. The ventrolateral orientated stapes are thought to better transmit seismic sound from the ground to the fenestra vestibuli than horizontal orientated stapes. Due to a low sound pressure level transformer ratio of 2-3, Kawingasaurus is thought to have seismic sensitivity of the middle ear and a reduced sensitivity to sounds that travel airborne. The quadrate-quadratojugal complex, a thin plate-like bone, transmits sound from the articular to the stapes via minor vibrations of the quadrate process. The ventral parts of the quadrate as well as the quadratojugal are fused to a single unit. The quadrate of K. fossilis is similar to other anomodonts.

The otic capsule also known as the bony housing of the inner ear of K. fossilis is inflated due to vestibule inflation. The external shape of the otic capsules is reliant on the shape of the vestibule as well as the anterior semicircular canals and ampullae. The otic capsules have significance due to sound transmission mechanisms via the snout, skull roof and otic capsules. On the right side of a preserved mandible, the remains of a small reflected lamina suggests that it covered parts of the recessus mandibularis serving as a sound receiving component. As in other nonmammalian synapsids, the mandible and jaw articulation found in Kawingasarus likely served for both hearing and feeding.

== Paleobiology ==
=== Diet ===
Kawingasaurus was an herbivore in the Late Permian Usili Formation in Tanzania. The exact dietary patterns are not fully understood as it is possible that this species may have varied in degrees of omnivory or insectivory. Due to its sloping skull, it was likely that Kawingasaurus was a grazer.

=== Locomotion ===
Kawingasaurus had a short neck and laterally-directed shoulder joint. The forelimbs were short and powerful. Its manus were broad with fused phalanges. The hind limbs were flexible and likely used to move dirt out of the way showing similarities to modern burrowing mammals. The form of locomotion for this species is thought to be quadrupedalism.

== Classification ==
Kawingasaurus belongs to the family Cistephalidae and shares this family with Sauroscaptor, Cistecephalus, and Cistecephaliodes genus. It was not until C. Barry Cox established this genus in 1972, when Kawingasaurus came to be. The cladogram below shows the phylogenetic position of Kawingasaurus.

- - Pylaecephalidae
    - Diictodon
    - - Eosimops
      - - Prosictodon
        - Robertia
  - Emydopoidea
    - Emydopidae
      Emydops
    - Kistecephalia
      - Kingoriidae
        - Dicynodontoides
        - Kombuisia
      - - Digalodon
        - - Myosauridae
            Myosaurus
          - Cistecephalidae
            - Sauroscaptor
            - - Cistecephalus
              - - Cistecephaloides
                - Kawingasaurus
- Bidentalia

== Paleoecology ==
Kawingasaurus appears to have been endemic to the Karoo Basin of South Africa.
