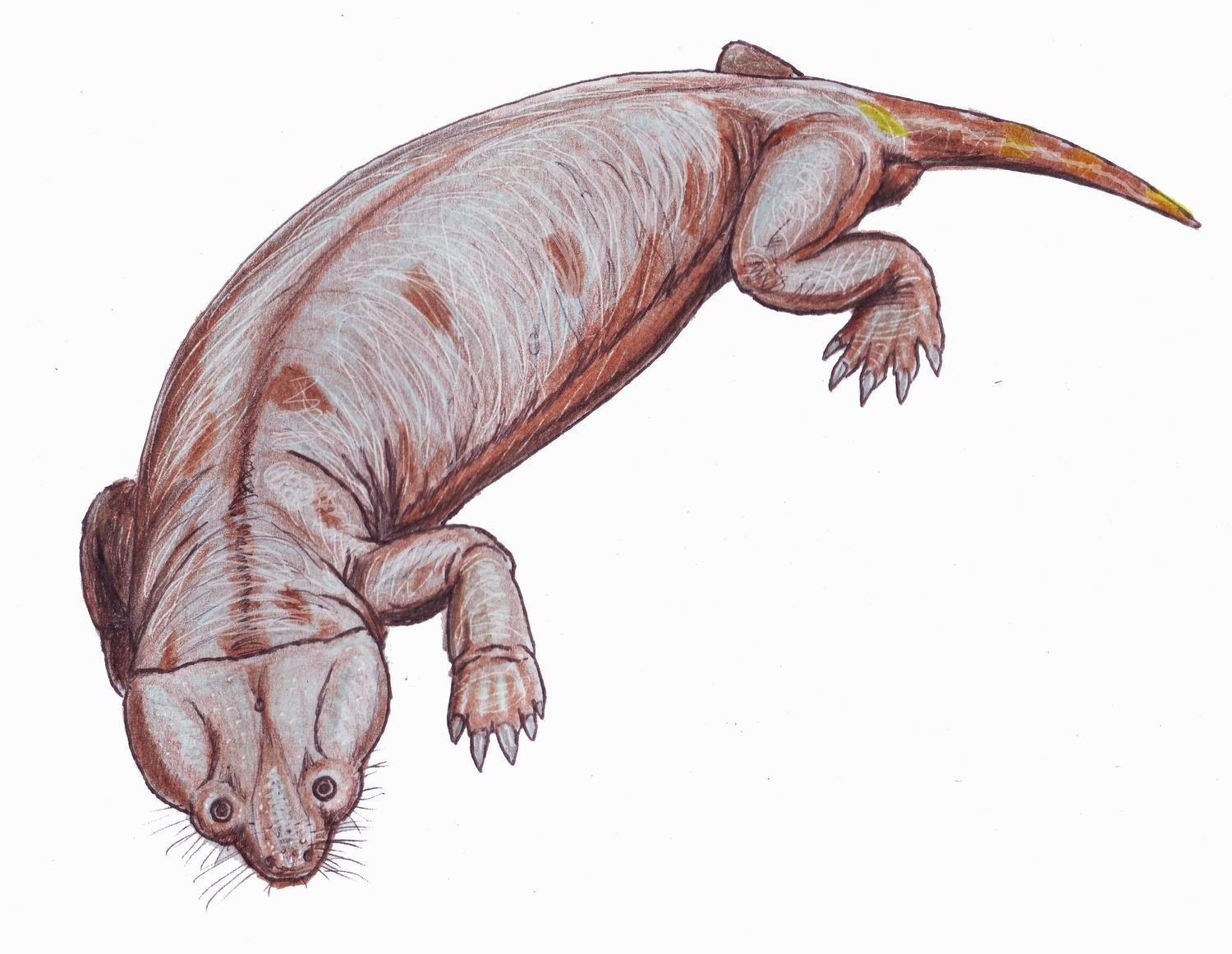
- Reconstruction of Cistecephalus microrhinus

Scientific classification
- Kingdom: Animalia
- Phylum: Chordata
- Clade: Synapsida
- Clade: Therapsida
- Clade: †Anomodontia
- Clade: †Dicynodontia
- Clade: †Kistecephalia
- Family: †Cistecephalidae; Broom, 1913

Genera
- †Cistecephalus; †Cistecephaloides; †Kawingasaurus; †Kembawacela; †Sauroscaptor

= Cistecephalidae =

Cistecephalidae Temporal range: Late Permian

Extinct family of dicynodonts

Cistecephalidae is an extinct family of dicynodont therapsids from the Late Permian of South Africa, India and Zambia. It includes the genera Cistecephalus, Cistecephaloides, and Kawingasaurus. Cistecephalids are thought to have had a fossorial or burrowing lifestyle, with adaptations such as broad skulls, strong forelimbs, and squat bodies. A similar group of dicynodonts called the pylaecephalids were also fossorial, although to a lesser extent than cistecephalids. Cistecephalids showed a high level of endemism, with each of the five known species unique to a single region.

== Description ==
Cistecephalids were small dicynodonts. Most species, with the exception of Kembawacela, lacked tusks, but sexually dimorphic supraorbital ridges were present. Cistecephalids had boxy, broad skulls with relatively laterally directed temporal openings, a result of a considerably broadened intertemporal region. Sauroscaptor, the most basal genus of the family, had a less extreme broadening of the intratemporal region than in other members of the family. In the derived genera Cistecephaloides and Kawingasaurus, the intratemporal portion of the skull was broader than the skull was long. Cistecephalids also had a relatively posteriorly positioned pineal foramen, which in Kembawacela and Sauroscaptor was displaced all the way to the posterior margin of the skull. They also had anteriorly directed orbits; they may have had binocular vision, which may have been an adaptation for nocturnality or an insectivorous lifestyle.

== Classification ==
The Cistecephalidae contains five named genera each with one species. It is a member of the Dicynodont clade Emydopoidea. Phylogeny following Kammerer et al. 2016:

- - - - Diictodon
      - - Eosimops
        - - Prosictodon
          - Robertia
    - - Emydops
      - - - Dicynodontoides
          - Kombuisia
        - - Digalodon
          - - Myosaurus
            - Cistecephalidae
              - Sauroscaptor
              - - Cistecephalus
                - - Cistecephaloides
                  - Kawingasaurus
  - Bidentalia
