= Sauroscaptor =

Sauroscaptor Temporal range: Lopingian

Scientific classification
- Domain: Eukaryota
- Kingdom: Animalia
- Phylum: Chordata
- Clade: Synapsida
- Clade: Therapsida
- Suborder: †Anomodontia
- Clade: †Dicynodontia
- Family: †Cistecephalidae
- Genus: †Sauroscaptor; Kammerer, Bandyopadhyay, and Ray, 2016

Type species
- †S. tharavati Kammerer, Bandyopadhyay, and Ray, 2016

Extinct genus of dicynodonts

Sauroscaptor is a genus of cistecephalid dicynodont from the upper Permian of India, containing one species, S. tharavati. It is remarkable for the extreme placement of its pineal foramen, which bulges out of the posterior margin of its skull.

== Etymology ==
Sauroscaptor means "lizard mole" or "lizard digger", and is derived from the Greek word σαῦρος, meaning "lizard", and the Greek word σκάπτω, meaning "digger", which is used as a suffix in the Indian mole genera Euroscaptor and Parascaptor. The type species, S. tharavati, honors Tharavat S. Kutty, discoverer of the Kundaram Formation fauna that includes Sauroscaptor.

== History ==
The fossils of Sauroscaptor show various forms of compression, and were originally interpreted as pertaining to several different genera of dicynodont. However, the shared presence of several unique traits not affected by compression proved that the fossils all belonged to a single endemic species.

== Description ==
Sauroscaptor, like most cistecephalids, was a tuskless, small-bodied, fossorial dicyonodont. The posterior margin of its pineal foramen bulges out from the back of the skull, resulting in a chimney-like nuchal crest continuous with the foramen. It has a significantly narrower skull table than is typical for cistecephalids. It is closely similar to an unnamed genus from Zambia, which shares the unusual pineal foramen position, but differ in the breadth of the skull table and morphology of the nuchal crest, as well as in the Zambian taxon being the only known tusked cisticephalid.

== Classification ==
- - - - Diictodon
      - - Eosimops
        - - Prosictodon
          - Robertia
    - - Emydops
      - - - Dicynodontoides
          - Kombuisia
        - - Digalodon
          - - Myosaurus
            - Cistecephalidae
              - Sauroscaptor
              - - Cistecephalus
                - - Cistecephaloides
                  - Kawingasaurus
  - Bidentalia

Phylogenetic position of Sauroscaptor within Diictodontia

Sauroscaptor is the basalmost known cistecephalid dicynodont.
