= Compsodon =

Compsodon Temporal range: Cistecephalus Assemblage Zone, Lopingian

Scientific classification
- Domain: Eukaryota
- Kingdom: Animalia
- Phylum: Chordata
- Clade: Synapsida
- Clade: Therapsida
- Suborder: †Anomodontia
- Clade: †Dicynodontia
- Superfamily: †Emydopoidea
- Genus: †Compsodon van Hoepen, 1934

Type species
- Compsodon helmoedi van Hoepen, 1934

Extinct genus of dicynodonts from Southern Africa

Compsodon is an extinct genus of dicynodont belonging to the superfamily Emydopoidea. Fossils have been found in the Balfour Formation of South Africa and the Madumabisa Mudstone of Zambia.

== Description ==
Compsodon helmoedi was originally described by Egbert Cornelis Nicolaas van Hoepen in 1934 on the basis of a single specimen from late Permian deposits in the Karoo Basin of South Africa. Two additional specimens from South African museum collections and three new specimens from the Luangwa Basin of Zambia have elucidated new aspects of the morphology of this species and indicate that it occurred in the upper Cistecephalus and lower Daptocephalus assemblage zones. Compsodon can be diagnosed by features of its palate, but also the presence of maxillary postcanines and parietals fused and narrowly exposed between broad postorbitals on the dorsal surface of the skull.

== See also ==
- List of therapsids
