= Myosauridae =

Myosauridae Temporal range: Late Permian to Early Triassic 259–247 Ma

Scientific classification
- Kingdom: Animalia
- Phylum: Chordata
- Clade: Synapsida
- Clade: Therapsida
- Clade: †Anomodontia
- Clade: †Dicynodontia
- Clade: †Kistecephalia
- Family: †Myosauridae; Kitching, 1968

Genera
- Myosauroides; Myosaurus

Extinct family of dicynodonts

Myosauridae is a family of dicynodont therapsids.
