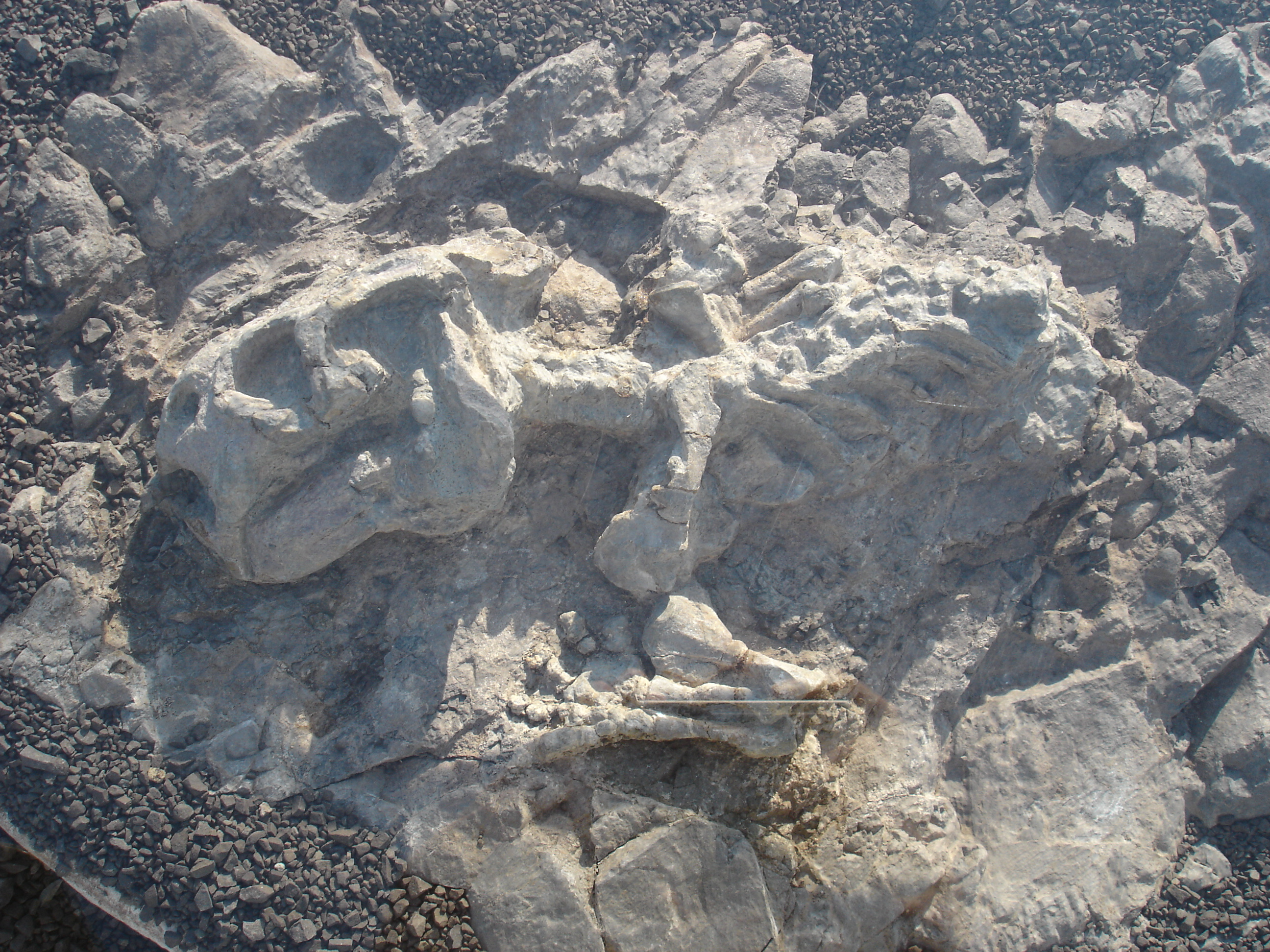
- Fossil of Diictodon

Scientific classification
- Kingdom: Animalia
- Phylum: Chordata
- Clade: Synapsida
- Clade: Therapsida
- Clade: †Anomodontia
- Clade: †Dicynodontia
- Family: †Pylaecephalidae van Hoepen, 1934

Type genus
- †Pylaecephalus Van Hoepen, 1934

Genera
- †Diictodon; †Eosimops; †Prosictodon; †Robertia

Synonyms
- Diictodontidae Cluver and King, 1983; Robertiidae Cluver and King, 1983

= Pylaecephalidae =

Pylaecephalidae Temporal range: Permian

Extinct family of dicynodonts

Pylaecephalidae is a family of dicynodont therapsids that includes Diictodon, Robertia, and Prosictodon from the Permian of South Africa. Pylaecephalids were small burrowing dicynodonts with long tusks. The family was first named in 1934 and was redefined in 2009. Diictodontidae and Robertiidae are considered junior synonyms of Pylaecephalidae; although Pylaecephalus itself is considered a junior synonym of Diictodon, the name Pylaecephalidae predates these names and therefore takes priority.

== Phylogeny ==
Below is a cladogram modified from Angielczyk et al. (2021):

- Pylaecephalidae
  - - Diictodon
    - Prosictodon
  - - Eosimops
    - Robertia
