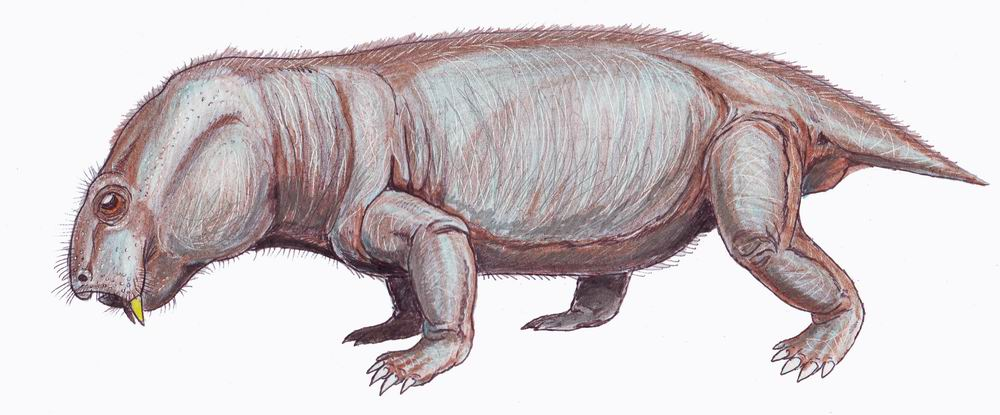
- Restoration of Dicynodontoides recurvidens

Scientific classification
- Kingdom: Animalia
- Phylum: Chordata
- Clade: Synapsida
- Clade: Therapsida
- Clade: †Anomodontia
- Clade: †Dicynodontia
- Clade: †Kistecephalia
- Family: †Kingoriidae; King, 1988

Genera
- †Dicynodontoides; †Kombuisia; †Niassodon; †Thliptosaurus

= Kingoriidae =

Kingoriidae Temporal range: Late Permian – Middle Triassic 259.9–242 Ma

Extinct family of dicynodonts

Kingoriidae is an extinct family of dicynodont therapsids. It includes the Late Permian Niassodon, Thliptosaurus, Dicynodontoides (initially called Kingoria) and the Triassic Kombuisia.
