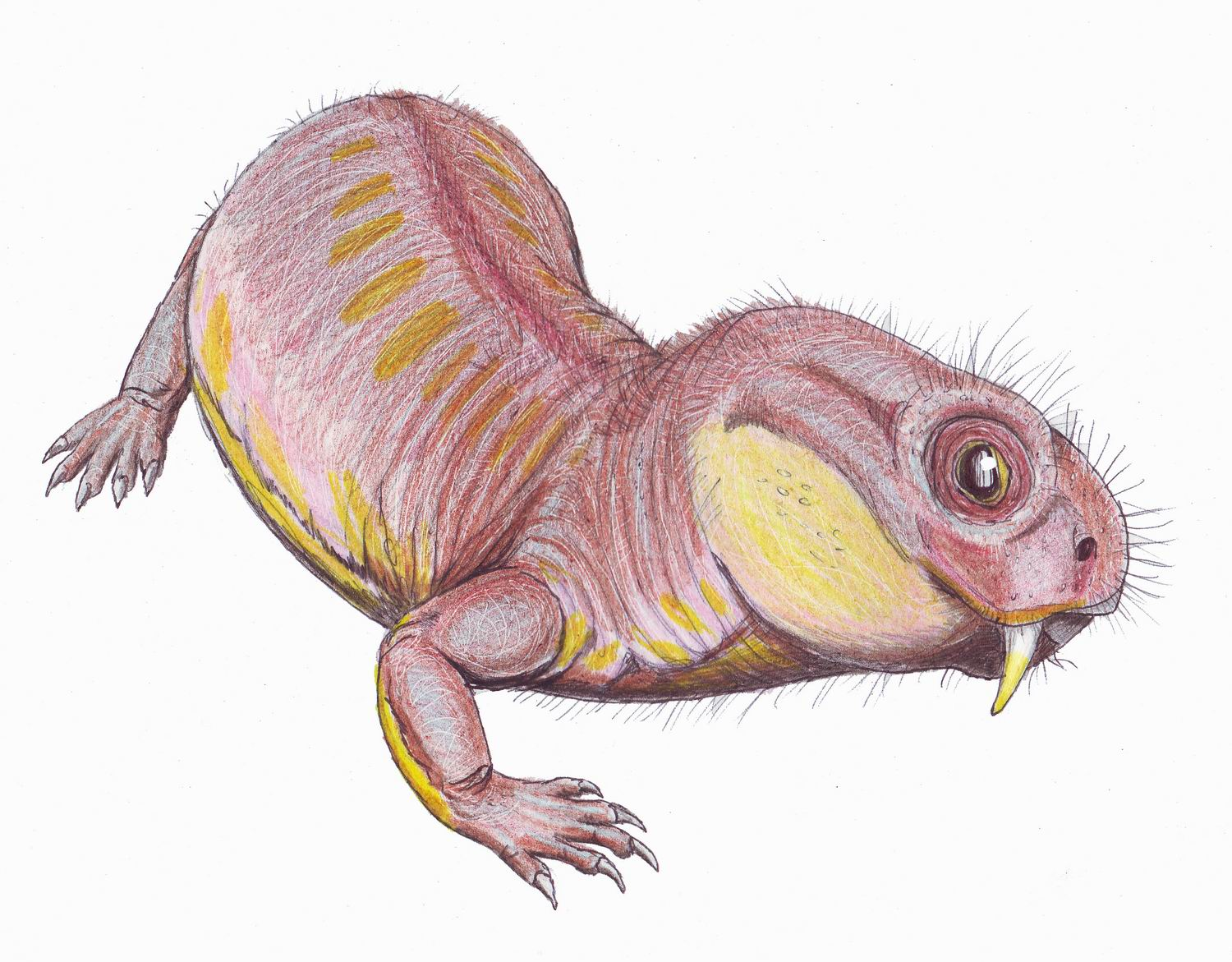

Scientific classification
- Domain: Eukaryota
- Kingdom: Animalia
- Phylum: Chordata
- Clade: Synapsida
- Clade: Therapsida
- Suborder: †Anomodontia
- Clade: †Dicynodontia
- Family: †Pylaecephalidae
- Genus: †Robertia; Boonstra, 1948

Type species
- †R. broomiana Boonstra, 1948

Synonyms
- †Dicynodon schroederi Toerien, 1953 †Broilius antjiesfonteinensis Toerien, 1953

= Robertia =

Robertia Temporal range: Middle Permian-Late Permian, 265–260 Ma

Extinct genus of dicynodonts

Robertia is an extinct genus of small herbivorous dicynodonts from the Middle to Late Permian of South Africa, between 260 and 265 million years ago. It is a monospecific genus, consisting of the type-species R. broomiana, which was classified by Lieuwe Dirk Boonstra in 1948 and named in honor of Robert Broom for his study of South African mammal-like reptiles.

Robertia had characteristic caniniform tusks and few, small teeth on the maxillary and dentary table. Its beak and the propalinal movement of the jaw, as with other dicynodonts, allowed for efficient cutting of plant matter. The solid, barrel-bodied creatures had a sprawling stance with a flexible backbone, which likely gave them a lizard-like appearance as they moved. They were about 15 cm in length.

Robertia is a member of the family Pylaecephalidae, which includes other small dicynodont therapsids with tusks such as Diictodon, Prosictodon, and Eosimops.

== History and discovery ==
Anomodonts and dicynodont subclade members were the most common species of the Permian and Triassic periods and were the first fossil vertebrates uncovered in the South African Karoo. The discovery of these animals was especially important as they exhibited mammal-like traits outside of the Mammalia taxon.

Keen fossil collector and amateur paleontologist A. G. Bain found the first anomodont in South Africa. Noticing the two prominent canines, he assigned it to a new genus, “Bidental.” Skull specimens were referred to Sir Richard Owen at the British Museum of Natural History, who placed them under the designation Dicynodon in the 1840s. Comparable specimens, but without tusks were placed in a new genus Oudenodon. As more of these mammal-like specimens were discovered during the early twentieth century, hundreds of species began to be described and amassed under the Dicynodon designation. In 1954, Haughton and Brink alone uncovered 54 dicynodont genera in the Karoo Basin and characterized 111 species under the single genus Dicynodon. Poor extraction and preparation of the Dicynodon type fossils and the minute differences that were used to distinguish its species contributed to the problem. At this point, taxa were described through dorsal or lateral sketches of the skull, suture patterns, proportions of the skull, and notation of the presence or absence of teeth and tusks. Further studies examining the lower jaw, postcanine teeth, and other characteristics have reduced the large amount of dicynodont taxa into fewer, more valid genera. The new group Pylaecephalinae (later Pylaecephalidae), within which Robertia lies, was established in 1934. Species of this family contains those of Diictodon and its closest relatives, having a characteristic intertemporal region and pineal foramen located in the pre-parietal.

Reexamining over a hundred skulls in the South African Museum designated Dicynodon jouberti, L.D. Boonstra separated out new taxa that fell outside the group. Robertia was characterized by Boonstra in 1948. The fossil specimens were discovered in the lower part of the Tapinocephalus Zone in the west part of the Beaufort Group.

In the 1950s, Toerien worked to further characterize and refine the species under the Dicynodon designation based on criteria beyond the features of the dorsal skull. Toerien specifically used the presence of a small palatine bone to further classify species. In 1953, he defined the species Dicynodon schroederi, which was later said to be synonymous with Diictodon feliceps in the 1980s. However, more recent characterization has recognized the species as Robertia broomiana, based on the specimen’s wide intertemporal bar, extensive exposure of the parietals, a narrow postorbital bar, and the presence of postcanine teeth.

== Geology and paleoenvironment ==
The South African Karoo Basin expands to about 300,000 km^{2} and contains the 145,000 km^{2} Beaufort Group of the Late Permian and Early Triassic. The Abrahamskraal Formation of the Beaufort group consists of the Eodicynodon, Tapinocephalus, and Pristerognathus Assemblage Zones, all of which are characterized by the prevalence and high diversity of dicynodonts. Robertia is found in the 1441- meter-thick Tapinocephalus Assemblage Zone in the northern region of the Abrahamskraal Formation. According to Jirah, Robertia’s range is 200 m below the Teekloof Formation; however, other sources claimed it spans into the Pristerognathus Assemblage Zone. This inconsistency is due to the fact that Rubidge and Angielczyk misidentified Eosimops in this range as Robertia. Robertia has not been identified in other Mid-Permian continental deposits.

Scarcity of fossils in the stratigraphic levels before the appearance of Robertia and its close relatives Eosimpos and Diictodon prevents accurate delineation of where members of each genus begin relative to each other. Dipping in the strata may have resulted in poor exposure of well defined divisional planes. In addition, many of the best-preserved specimens that can accurately be classified as Robertia were collected without precise location documentation. As a result, the range of Robertia may also extend further than is currently known.

Robertia fossil specimens have been uncovered in mudstone and sandstone, which have been formed by river flow across the alluvial plains. It is thought that the paleoenvironment of the Beaufort Karoo consisted of large rivers around 350 meters wide and 11 meters deep running into a system of lakes that were no more than 50 meters deep. Late Permian South Africa was likely warm to hot, with average temperatures ranging from 16 to 20 °C and experienced seasonal rainfall, about 50 to 70 cm yearly, disrupting the semi-arid climate. There would have been occasional flash-flooding.

Along the Permian Karoo Basin riverbanks, the vegetation included woody deciduous Glossopteris and the bamboo-like Phyllotheca. The lowland areas likely gave rise to a variety of ferns, mosses, and lycopods. This would have formed the basis of Robertia’s diet. There is some suggestion of the presence of stretches of savanna, but others doubt this, since ferns do not make up modern savannas. The region’s hot, semi-arid climate dependent on intermittent rainfall may have placed pressure on the herbivorous dicynodonts of the time, turning them towards digging for rhizomes below the ground surface.

== Description ==
=== Skull ===
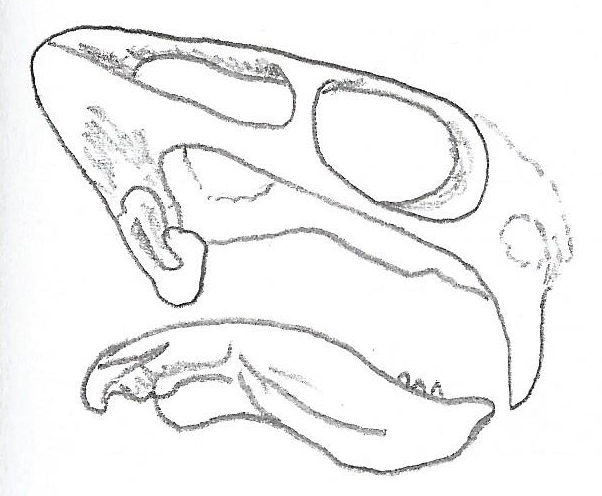
Skull of Robertia in right lateral view. Note the large caniniform tusk.

Robertia’s skull reached a length of 130 mm, large compared to other small dicynodonts. Some specimens have minor grooves on the facial surface. It has a characteristic relatively wide intertemporal region, which exposes the parietal bones in the midline. A low dorsal ridge of the premaxilla with a narrow groove along its midline runs between the nasals. Robertia has two, large caniniform tusks and about three, small irregularly placed maxillary teeth posteromedial to the tusks. The anterior edge of the tusks also have a sharp edge. Anteromedial to the tusks, the maxilla bears a sharp edge. A sharp palatal notch and a maxillary notch are located behind the rear edge of the maxilla and upper anterior region of the tusks, respectively.

Whether the presence of tusks is a sexual dimorphism in Robertia is questioned, as the best preserved specimens all have tusks, but it is more difficult to determine if they are evident in the poorly preserved fossils. Some studies determined that tusks were variable in Robertia, however more recent accounts have stated they are consistently present across Robertia.

The palatines are distinctive, forming an anterior gap and not meeting the vomers. Robertia has smaller palatines compared to close relative Pristerodon, but larger than the palatines of Emydops. The pterygoids are slightly curved and have fairly high, thin triangular-shaped flanges halfway down their length. The interpterygoid vacuities are longer and tear-drop shaped compared to other pylaecephalids. Robertia has a short secondary palate, with the choana anterior and at the same level as the tusks.

The dentary shelf does not protrude as much as in Emydops, and the concave dentary tables hold five to six pointed teeth medially. Robertia is one of the pylaecephalids with the most dentary teeth, which occlude with the palatine pad (a ridged region posterolateral to the main secondary palate) upon jaw retraction. A beak is located anterior to the tusks and the outer side of the dentary.

=== Postcranial skeleton ===
Robertia is described as “solidly built, barrel-bodied animals.” It had developed postural limb musculature, a trochanter on the femur, diminished pre-acetabular iliac expansion relative to the post-acetabular, an anteriorly expanded pubis, and an abducted femur, which differentiate it from Diictodon.

The radius and ulna are thin and about three-quarters the length of the humerus, articulating at right angles to the humerus. The antebrachium was also positioned at a right angle relative to the humerus, indicating a sprawling posture of the forelimb. This suggests the necessity of strong postural muscles, which would prevent collapse under the weight of gravity. The appropriate attachment sites for muscles such as the ventral adductor, biceps, brachialis, coracobrachialis, and pectoralis are accordingly well developed. Characteristic of other dicynodonts, both ends of the humerus are expanded. The head of this bone faces slightly medially and dorsally. Robertia has blunt claws on the end of each phalanx, with a protuberance on the undersides. On one fossil specimen, the metacarpal and the phalanges of the longest finger are the same length as the radius.

The S-shaped femur similarly articulates in a right-angled, sprawling position. All dicynodonts had a parasagittal hindlimb posture, besides Robertia. The femur head is more pronounced on the dorsal surface and is not offset from the main bone shaft. Well-developed regions of attachment for muscles such as the pubo-ischio-femoralis externus, ventral adductor, femorotibialis, and gastrocnemius provide support for the sprawling gait. The feet also have claws, which are rounder than those of the hand and have a dorsal ridge.

The thoracic and lumbar ribs are long and straight, suggesting a backward-angled orientation for clearance of the abdomen from the ground. Robertia had either two or three sacral vertebrae. The vertebral column was flexible, the pre-zygapophyses being flat and wide and articulating horizontally with the post-zygapophyses.

The tail is only slightly muscular and is about one-eighth the length of the body.

== Paleobiology ==
=== Feeding system ===
Robertia and other dicynodonts had a particularly specialized jaw. A forward-backward motion of the lower jaw allowed them to effectively breakdown vegetation. Robertia’s small, fragile teeth may not have played a direct role in chewing, despite their ability to run along the dentary table. Shredding from movement of the dentary along the caniniform tusks and up past the premaxilla and maxilla occurred as the lower jaw motioned propalinally. The sharp blades of the dentary and along the tusks provide cutting action. The front end of the jaws and the anterior notch aligned the vegetation in the mouth, and as the lower jaw moves backward, it pulled the plant matter past the caniniform tusks, cutting it into bite-size pieces. The food was further processed by the dentary blades and the edges of the tusks and crushed on the palatine pad.

The horned beak may have allowed small dicynodonts such as Robertia to pick out individual leaves, seeds, and buds, however it is suggested that they preferred stems and rhizomes over leafy vegetation. Their claws may have been utilized for tearing or digging in the search for food. Different times of the year may have called for different selections of food sources in the Permian.

It has been suggested that the less developed masticatory system may have led to Robertia's selection of certain foods and may have limited its ability to persist in comparison to the more sophisticated systems of groups such as Emydops and Pristerodon, which may have been more generalist feeders.

=== Locomotion ===
Robertia had a sprawling gait. The position and rounding of the dorsal articulation area of the femur allowed for a longer stride compared to earlier sprawling animals. The pectoral girdle muscles had a postural function rather than locomotory function and thus provided less thrust than the muscles of the hindlimb. The flexibility of the vertebrae allowed for extensive side to side movement as Robertia moved, similar to a modern lizard. Their long hands may have provided a platform of stability, however they may not have been wide enough for proper support. Robertia had a short tail, which may have helped with maneuverability at high speeds and over uneven ground.

=== Metabolism and thermoregulation ===
Robertia was likely ectothermic. Robertia and its dicynodont relatives have a large pineal foramen on their skull, suggesting a light-sensitive pineal organ was used to track and take advantage of solar intensity cycles. Locating optimal temperatures would have helped in digestion.
