= Cistecephaloides =

Cistecephaloides Temporal range: Late Permian ~259–254 Ma

Scientific classification
- Domain: Eukaryota
- Kingdom: Animalia
- Phylum: Chordata
- Clade: Synapsida
- Clade: Therapsida
- Suborder: †Anomodontia
- Clade: †Dicynodontia
- Family: †Cistecephalidae
- Genus: †Cistecephaloides; Cluver 1974

Species
- C. boonstrai Cluver 1974

Extinct genus of dicynodonts

Cistecephaloides is an extinct genus of dicynodont therapsids of the Cistecephalus Assemblage Zone, Beaufort Group of South Africa.

== See also ==
- List of therapsids
