= Prosictodon =

Prosictodon Temporal range: Middle Permian

Scientific classification
- Domain: Eukaryota
- Kingdom: Animalia
- Phylum: Chordata
- Clade: Synapsida
- Clade: Therapsida
- Suborder: †Anomodontia
- Clade: †Dicynodontia
- Family: †Pylaecephalidae
- Genus: †Prosictodon; Angielczyk & Rubidge, 2010

Species
- †P. dubei Angielczyk & Rubidge, 2010 (type)

Extinct genus of dicynodonts

Prosictodon is an extinct genus of pylaecephalid dicynodont from Middle Permian of South Africa. It was first named by Kenneth D. Angielczyk and Bruce S. Rubidge in 2010 and the type species is Prosictodon dubei.
