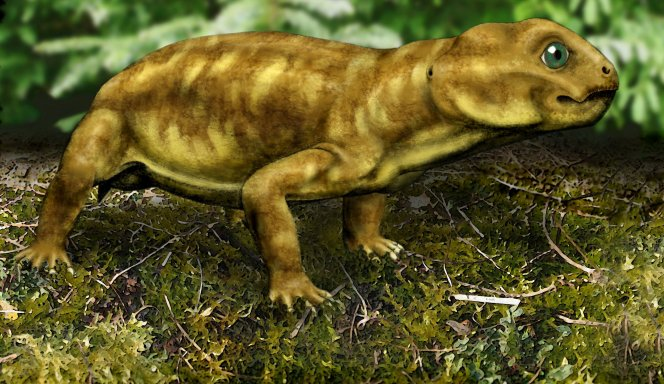
- Restoration of Myosaurus gracilis

Scientific classification
- Kingdom: Animalia
- Phylum: Chordata
- Clade: Synapsida
- Clade: Therapsida
- Clade: †Anomodontia
- Clade: †Dicynodontia
- Family: †Myosauridae; Kitching, 1968
- Genus: †Myosaurus; Haughton, 1917

Type species
- †M. gracilis Haughton, 1917

= Myosaurus =

Myosaurus Temporal range: Early Triassic 251-247 MA

Extinct genus of dicynodont from the lower Triassic

Myosaurus (Greek for “mice-like lizard,” with mys- meaning mouse, and -sauros meaning lizard) is a genus of dicynodont synapsids. Myosaurus was a small, herbivorous synapsid that existed around the early Triassic period. All of the fossils found of this species were found in Antarctica and South Africa. Compared to other fossils found from species that existed during this time, the Myosaurus is not common in the fossil record. This is due to a shortage of discovered fossils that possess characteristics unique to the Myosaurus. Notably, under 130 fossil fragments have been found that have been classified as Myosauridae, and almost all have been skulls. These skulls can be classified as Myosaurus because this species, unlike other dicynodonts, do not possess tusks or postfrontal teeth. The only species identified in the family Myosauridae is the Myosaurus gracilis, or M. gracilis. It should be recognized that the Myosaurus is almost always referred to as the M. gracilis in scientific research.

== History and discovery ==
The Myosaurus was first discovered in the Harrismith Commonage locality, a site found in the Lystrosaurus zone. This locality is based in South Africa. Around 10 skulls were discovered that could not be classified as Lystrosauridae, and were thus identified as being Myosaurus. Around 116 specimens later identified as Myosauridae were also found by W.R. Hammer and J. W. Cosgriff, and these specimens were located in the early Triassic Fremouw Formation of the Cumulus Hills in the Queen Maud Mountains. This location is found in the Transantarctic range in Antarctica. Almost all the specimens of Myosaurus found were preserved in green siltstone.

The skulls were first identified as the Endothiodontidae in 1917, a taxon from the late Permian period. This was in part due to the wide interorbital width that exists in both Myosauridae and Endothiodontidae skulls. Endothiodontidae, though, have both postfrontal and postcanine teeth. The new skulls found had neither. It was also thought that the skulls might have been thought to be Cistecephalus. However, it was noted that the wide posterior end of the skull roof was more exaggerated in Cistecephalus skulls. Also, the Cistecephalus skull lacks the interpterygoid vacuity of which the unidentified skulls had. In 1977, the skulls were later classified as Myosauridae.

== Description ==
=== Skull ===
The Myosaurus gracilis skulls that have been found contain many features that distinguish them from other related species. The Myosaurus generally have smaller skulls compared to their dicynodont relatives. The skulls found in South Africa average to be around 40 millimeters in length, while the skulls found in Antarctica are only marginally larger, averaging to be about 55 mm in length.

==== Skull roof ====
The Myosaurus skulls were found to have a wide dorsal region, which also creates a large intertemporal region. The pineal foramen is located more posteriorly in the skull. The ophthalmic cavity surrounds the nasal ramus. Compared to other dicynodonts, the nasal ramus is located more anteriorly (toward the mouth). Broad parietals are situated in the lateral plane, but they take up a short region at the posterior end of the skull roof and only reach around to create the dorsal surface of the lower temporal bar. The skulls were found to have a short and narrow pre-orbital region of the skull. However, they do have relatively large orbits.

==== Palate/jaw ====
The large premaxillary portion of the jaw is joined with small ventral exposures to create a secondary palate. The maxillary area is also quite expansive. A palatine foramen is also present and is situated in the space where the pterygoid and ectopterygoid are joined. The palatine foramen is not present in most dicynodont skulls. The ectopterygoid serves as a location where the pterygoid can be joined to both the palatine and maxilla. The pterygoid then splits to outline the choanae before eventually widening toward the anterior part of the palate.

The Myosaurus also lacks postfrontal teeth, and their canines protrude from their lower jaw. The lower jaw also exhibits a thick dentary. The dentary envelopes a large mandibular fenestra, another defining characteristic.

==== Occiput ====
The occiput portion of the Myosaurus skull contains a small, slit-like hole, and it has been hypothesized by researchers to be a nutrient channel. This would have supplied the skull and existing teeth with the nutrients needed to grow and strengthen.

==== Key Distinguishing Characteristics of the Skull ====
A skull feature observed in most dicynodonts is tusks. However, one of the distinguishing characteristics of the Myosaurus is its lack of tusks. Their maxillary area is expansive and larger than other dicynodonts. Because tusks are not a feature of the skull, there is no structure taking up room and crowding the maxillary area.

Another unique feature of the Myosaurus skull is the shortened beak. Their keratinous upper beak, although present, is greatly reduced in size and does not protrude as far as its dicynodont relatives. This is due in part to the distinct trigeminal canal patterns in the Myosaurus skull.

== Classification ==
The Myosaurus gracilis belongs to the Kistecephlia clade, a subclade of the greater Anomodontia and Dicynodontia clades. The Myosaurus is in the Myosauridae family, of which it is its only member. The Myosaurus is most closely related to the Cistecephalus and Kawingasaurus taxa, which are both members of the Cistecephalidae family.

== Paleobiology ==
=== Burrowing ===
Since there have been so few fossils found of the Myosaurus, there is no actual evidence that verifies that this taxa was a burrower. However, based on the types of burrows found in both South Africa and Antarctica made by their Lystrosaurus/ dicynodont relatives, it is widely hypothesized that the Myosaurus were burrowers as well. Most of this evidence derives from Antarctica where there may have been large environmental fluctuations during the Triassic period, a possible repercussion of the Permian-Triassic extinction event. The burrows would have provided shelter from hot and cold temperatures because of their insulation qualities. They also may have been utilized by tetrapods to gain shelter from predators. Two types of burrows were made during the Triassic period. They were classified by their size by scientists as Type L (large) and Type G (giant) burrows. Tetrapods were hypothesized to have made Type G burrows; these burrows match the size and shape of Triassic tetrapods. The size of the burrows is closely correlated with the size of the creator. The stone deposits in these burrows also match the age of the tetrapod fossils found around it. The Type G burrows in Antarctica range from 8–19 cm in diameter. This size would have accommodated the Myosaurus well because it would have been the appropriate size to fit in these burrows.

Further evidence that supports the idea the Myosaurus might have had a fossorial lifestyle is that the Myosaurus was close relatives to Cistecephalus and Kawingasaurus, both members of the family Cistephalidae. These taxa were known to be burrowers as well.

=== Feeding mechanism ===
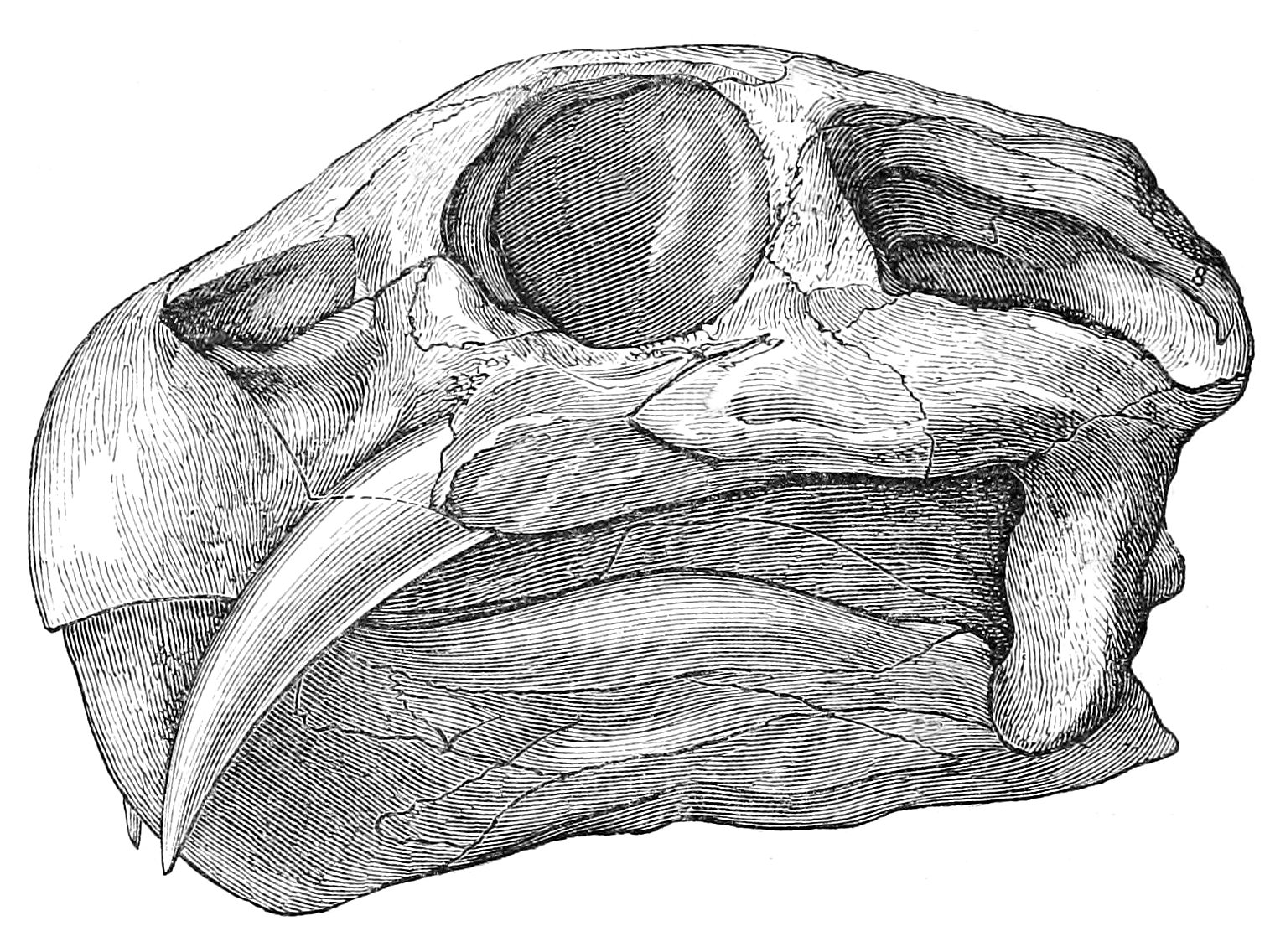
Dicynodont Skull

There are so few fossils from the Myosaurus to justify any evidence of feeding mechanisms unique to this taxonomic group. However, the Myosaurus is classified as a part of the dicynodont clade. Luckily, there is extensive research on the mechanism of chewing in dicynodont taxa. The Myosaurus, like its dicynodont relatives, was herbivorous. Consequently, the dicynodont jaws were highly advanced for the purpose of feeding to break down the fibrous structure of plants.

The keratinous beak possessed by dicynodonts and the Myosaurus was likely used for cutting plants. This is because the large surface area of the beak would have provided a sharp tool for the taxa to cut plants on. The jaw itself functioned as a good shearing and grinding instrument. The elongated articular paired with the short quadrate allowed the Myosaurus to take an orthal (vertical) bite. This would have provided them with the ability to break the plants from their stalks. Grinding ability was created by the palatines’ ability to rub against the dentary groove located in the lower jaw.

Dicynodonts likely used their tusks to grub, or dig in the ground for food. However, since the Myosaurus did not have tusks, grubbing was likely not a component of their feeding behavior.

== Paleoecology ==
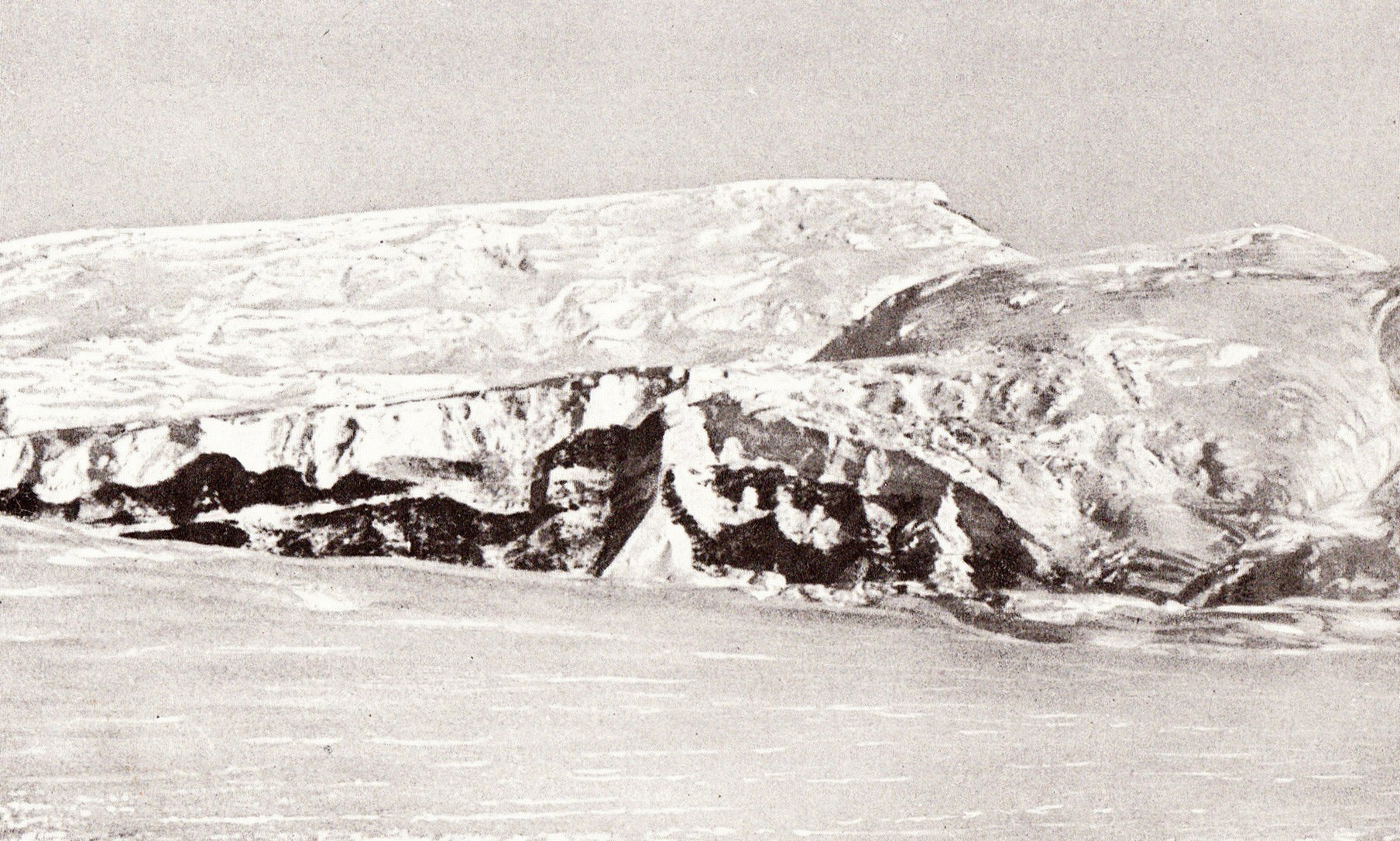
Image of the Queen Maud Mountains in Antarctica

Myosaurus skulls have been found in both South Africa and Antarctica. In South Africa, only about 10 skull fragments were found in the Karoo Basin of the Lystrosaurus zone at the Harrismith Commonage locality. This area, however, is extremely species rich, primarily filled with dicynodont therapsids. However, the most fossils of the Myosaurus have been found in Antarctica in the Fremouw Formation of the Cumulus Hills in the Queen Maud Mountains. This location lies between the Shackleton and McGregor Glaciers. This site is also diverse, containing mostly Myosaurus, Lystrosaurus, and Thrinaxodon fossils. Fragments of Myosaurus have been primarily found in green siltstone in these regions. This stone is formed in layers and dates back to the Early to Late Triassic periods.

== See also ==
- List of therapsids
