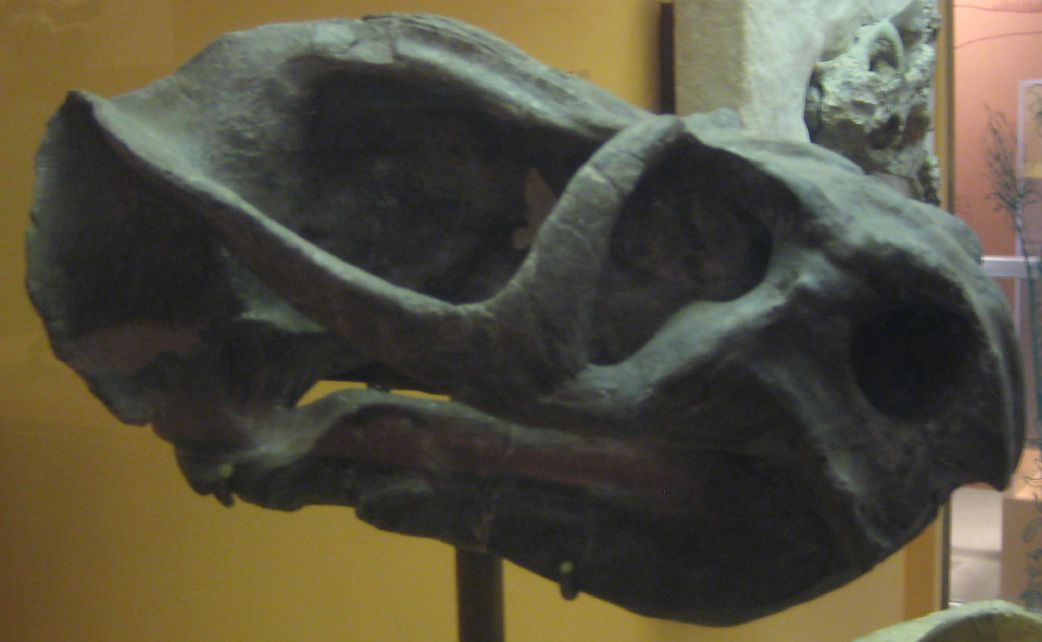
- Skull of Oudenodon latirostris

Scientific classification
- Domain: Eukaryota
- Kingdom: Animalia
- Phylum: Chordata
- Clade: Synapsida
- Clade: Therapsida
- Suborder: †Anomodontia
- Clade: †Dicynodontia
- Parvorder: †Pristerodontia; Cluver and King, 1983

Clades
- Dicynodontoidea

= Pristerodontia =

Pristerodontia Temporal range: Late Permian – Late Triassic

Group of mammals

Pristerodontia is a group of dicynodont therapsids that includes cryptodontids, geikiids, lystrosaurids, kannemeyeriids, and other related forms. Pristerodontians were one of the few groups of dicynodonts to survive the Permian–Triassic extinction event, diversifying in the Triassic.

== Phylogeny ==
Pristerodontia in a cladogram modified from Angielczyk and Rubidge (2010) showing the phylogenetic relationships of Dicynodontia:

- Dicynodontia
  - Eodicynodon
  - - Colobodectes
    - - Lanthanostegus
      - - Pylaecephalidae
          - Robertia
          - Diictodon
          - Prosictodon
        - - Chelydontops
          - Endothiodon
          - - Pristerodon
            - - Emydopoidea
                - Emydops
                - - - Myosaurus
                    - Kingoriidae
                      - Dicynodontoides
                      - Kombuisia
                  - Cistecephalidae
                    - Cistecephalus
                    - - Cistecephaloides
                      - Kawingasaurus
              - Pristerodontia
                - - Interpresosaurus
                  - Elph
                  - - Rhachiocephalus
                    - - Cryptodontidae
                        - Oudenodon
                        - - Tropidostoma
                          - Australobarbarus
                      - Geikiidae
                        - Odontocyclops
                        - - Idelesaurus
                          - - Aulacephalodon
                            - - Geikia
                              - Pelanomodon
                - Dicynodontoidea
                  - Katumbia
                  - - Delectosaurus
                    - - Dicynodon
                      - - Lystrosauridae
                        - - Kannemeyeriiformes
                          - Vivaxosaurus
