= Daqingshanodon =

Daqingshanodon Temporal range: Late Permian

Scientific classification
- Domain: Eukaryota
- Kingdom: Animalia
- Phylum: Chordata
- Clade: Synapsida
- Clade: Therapsida
- Suborder: †Anomodontia
- Clade: †Dicynodontia
- Clade: †Cryptodontia
- Genus: †Daqingshanodon; Zhu, 1989

Type species
- †D. limbus Zhu, 1989

Extinct genus of dicynodonts

Daqingshanodon is an extinct genus of dicynodont therapsid from the Late Permian of Inner Mongolia, China. The type species D. limbus was described in 1989 from a single skull found in the Naobaogou Formation. Daqingshanodon belongs to a group of dicynodonts called cryptodonts. It is the smallest known cryptodont, and the only one known from China. Like other cryptodonts, it has a pair of rounded nasal bosses above its nostrils and a ridge of bone on the upper jaw called the postcaniniform process. Daqingshanodon has a pair of elongated, recurved tusks extending from its beak-like snout. It is distinguished from other dicynodonts by the presence of a distinct ridge running along the side of the skull from below the eye socket to the area around the tusks. The skull of Daqingshanodon is less than 10 centimetres (3.9 in) long, yet this specimen is thought to have been an adult on the basis of its well-developed nasal bosses.

In his 1998 study of dicynodont biogeography, paleontologist Spencer G. Lucas synonymized Daqingshanodon with Dicynodon, forming the species Dicynodon limbus. Most of the features used to distinguish Daqingshanodon as a distinct genus were also seen in specimens of Dicynodon. In 2011, a study of Dicynodon species included D. limbus in its phylogenetic analysis. D. limbus was placed among the cryptodonts, which are only distantly related to Dicynodon. With this phylogenetic placement, the genus Daqingshanodon was reinstated for D. limbus. Below is a cladogram from the 2011 analysis:

- Bidentalia
  - Cryptodontia
    - Keyseria
    - - Daqingshanodon
      - - Oudenodontidae
          - Oudenodon
          - - Tropidostoma
            - Australobarbarus
        - - - Odontocyclops
            - Idelesaurus
          - - Rhachiocephalidae
              - Rhachiocephalus
              - Kitchinganomodon
            - Geikiidae
              - - Aulacocephalodon
                - Pelanomodon
              - Geikia
  - Dicynodontoidea
    - Interpresosaurus
    - Elph
    - Katumbia
    - - Gordonia
      - - Delectosaurus
        - - Vivaxosaurus
          - - Dicynodon
            - - - Daptocephalus
                - - Dinanomodon
                  - Peramodon
              - - Lystrosauridae
                - - Turfanodon
                  - Kannemeyeriiformes
