= Rastodon =

Rastodon Temporal range: ~Guadalupian (middle Permian), ~268–259 Ma
- Holotype specimen

Scientific classification
- Kingdom: Animalia
- Phylum: Chordata
- Clade: Synapsida
- Clade: Therapsida
- Clade: †Anomodontia
- Clade: †Dicynodontia
- Family: †Kingoriidae
- Genus: †Rastodon; Boos et al. 2016
- Species: †R. procurvidens

Binomial name
- †Rastodon procurvidens Boos et al. 2016

Extinct genus of dicynodonts

Rastodon is a genus of dicynodont, an extinct group of herbivorous therapsids (the group to which modern mammals belong) from the Guadalupian (middle Permian) of Brazil. The type and only species is R. procurvidens, named in 2016 for its forward-curving tusks, unique among dicynodonts. Rastodon is one of the only dicynodonts known from the Permian period of South America. Rastodon was initially described as the earliest member of Bidentalia, a derived group of dicynodonts, and though this relationship was regarded with some scepticism, it was not until 2025 that the specimen was re-examined and reinterpreted as a member of the dicynodont family Kingoriidae.

== History of discovery ==
The single specimen of Rastodon was discovered in an outcrop of the Rio do Rasto Formation at the Boqueirão Farm, in the municipality of São Gabriel, Rio Grande do Sul, Brazil. This locality is assigned to the Morro Pelado Member of the formation, which has been roughly dated to the Guadalupian, or the middle Permian period.

=== Etymology ===
The genus name Rastodon is derived from the Rio do Rasto Formation, where its fossils have been found, and the Greek word for "tooth". The species name, R. procurvidens, means "curved forward tooth" and describes the forward-pointing shape of its tusks, unusual amongst dicynodonts.

== Description ==
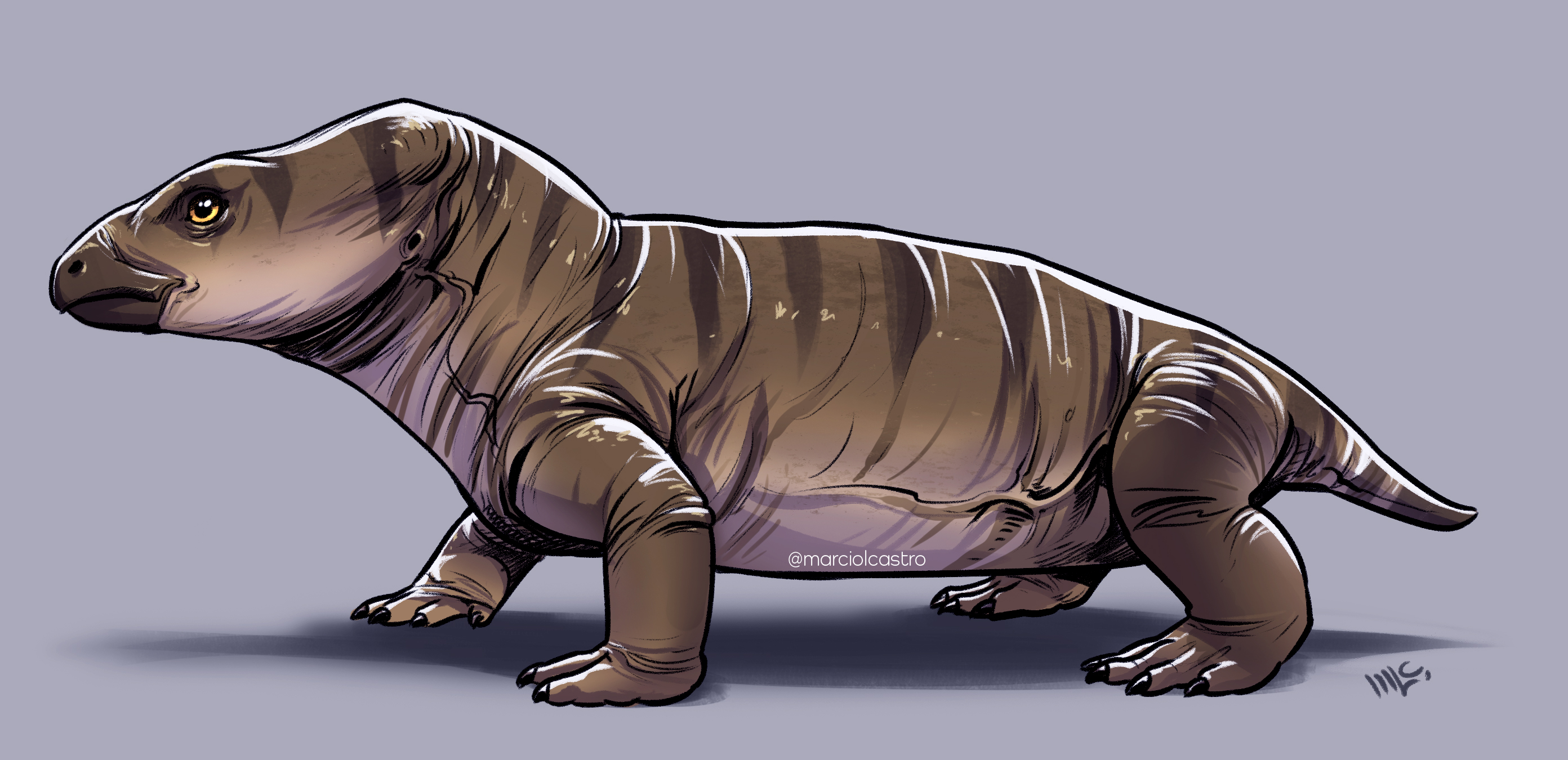
Life restoration

Like other dicynodonts, Rastodon had beaked jaws sporting only a single pair of tusk-like caniniform teeth (i.e. canine-like) and a keratin-covered nasal boss. Its "tusks" are among its most distinctive features, which uniquely curve forwards (anteriorly), and are positioned in a pocket or embayment the lateral bony wall of the caniniform process of the maxilla, rather than erupting below them as in most dicynodonts, obscuring them from view externally. Furthermore, its skull is relatively long and shallow compared to its close relatives. Its tusks contacted the lower jaw during propalinal mastication.

== Classification ==
Upon its initial description Rastodon was recovered in a phylogenetic analysis as the basalmost member of Bidentalia, a derived and successful clade of dicynodonts that thrived during the late Permian and Triassic. As a middle Permian bidentalian, Rastodon would provide insight into the origins of the clade, and was taken to suggest they may have originated in Gondwana. However, the phylogenetic position of Rastodon is contentious, and in the years following its description some researchers suspected that Rastodon was instead a member of Emydopoidea, a clade well represented in the middle Permian and the sister clade of Bidentalia. However, despite the scepticism, phylogenetic analyses consistently recovered Rastodon as the basalmost member of Bidentalia, with the exception of one analysis in 2023 that recovered it as the basalmost emydopoid. The relationships of Rastodon could only be fully reassessed until 2025 when it was analysed with micro-computed tomography to examine palate and mandible. Following this, an updated phylogenetic analysis recovered Rastodon not as a bidentalian, but an emydopoid in the family Kingoriidae.

The cladograms below depict the original results of Boos et al. (2016, left), who recovered Rastodon as a bidentalian, and da Silva et al. (2025, right) who recovered it as a kingoriid. Both cladograms have been simplified, and relationships within bolded terminal clades are not shown:

Boos et al. (2016): Bidentalian Rastodon

- Dicynodontia
  - Nyaphulia (originally "Eodicynodon" oelofseni)
  - - Colobodectes
    - - Eodicynodon
      - - Lanthanostegus
        - - **Pylaecephalidae**
          - - Chelydontops
            - - Pristerodon
              - - **Endothiodontia**
                - - Emydopoidea
                    - **Kingoriidae**
                    - - Digalodon
                      - - Emydops
                        - - Myosaurus
                          - **Cistecephalidae**
                  - Bidentalia
                    - **Rastodon**
                    - - Idelesaurus
                      - - **Oudenodontidae**
                        - - **Geikiidae**
                          - - **Rhachiocephalidae**
                            - - - Daqingshanodon
                                - Keyseria
                              - **Dicynodontoidea**

da Silva et al. (2025): Kingoriid Rastodon

- Dicynodontia
  - Nyaphulia
  - - Eodicynodon
    - - Colobodectes
      - - Lanthanostegus
        - - **Pylaecephalidae**
          - - Pristerodon
            - - Brachyprosopus
              - - **Endothiodontia**
                - - **Bidentalia**
                  - Emydopoidea
                    - Kingoriidae
                      - **Rastodon**
                      - - Kombuisia
                        - Dicynodontoides
                    - - - Emydops
                        - Compsodon
                      - Kistecephalia
                        - Digalodon
                        - - Myosaurus
                          - **Cistecephalidae**

== See also ==
- List of synapsids
