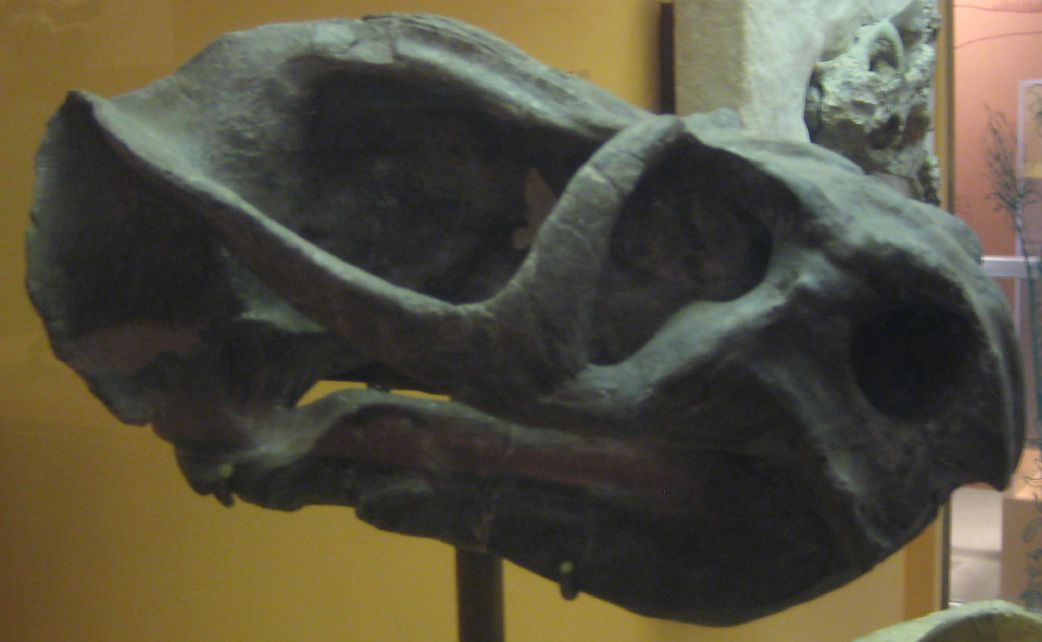
- Skull of Oudenodon latirostris

Scientific classification
- Kingdom: Animalia
- Phylum: Chordata
- Clade: Synapsida
- Clade: Therapsida
- Clade: †Anomodontia
- Clade: †Dicynodontia
- Clade: †Bidentalia
- Clade: †Cryptodontia; Owen, 1860

Subgroups
- †Daqingshanodon; †Keyseria; †Mdomowabata; †Odontocyclops; †Elphidae?; †Geikiidae; †Oudenodontidae; †Rhachiocephalidae

Synonyms
- Cryptodontidae

= Cryptodontia =

Cryptodontia Temporal range: Middle Permian - Late Permian

Extinct clade of dicynodonts

Cryptodontia is a group of dicynodont therapsids that includes the families Geikiidae, Oudenodontidae, and Rhachiocephalidae. It was first named in 1860 by English paleontologist Richard Owen. Owen intended Cryptodontia to be a family, and the name was later changed to "Cryptodontidae" to reflect this ranking. The name Cryptodontia was restored in 2009 when it was redefined as a larger clade containing several families of dicynodonts.

== Classification ==
Below is a cladogram from Kammerer et al. (2011) showing the phylogenetic placement of Cryptodontia:

- Dicynodontia
  - Eodicynodon
  - - Pylaecephalidae
    - - Eumantellidae
      - - Endothiodontidae
        - Therochelonia
          - Emydopoidea
            - Emydopidae
            - - Kingoriidae
              - Cistecephalidae
              - Myosauridae
          - Bidentalia
            - Cryptodontia
              - Rhachiocephalidae
              - - Oudenodontidae
                - Geikiidae
            - Dicynodontoidea
              - "Dicynodon"
              - - Lystrosauridae
                - Kannemeyeriiformes
                  - Shansiodontidae
                  - Kannemeyeriidae
                  - Stahleckeriidae
                  - Dinodontosauridae

Below is a cladogram by Angielczyk and Otoo, 2025 in their description of the species Mdomowabata trilobops, depicting the interrelationships of cryptodonts in more detail.

- Bidentalia
  - Rastodon procurvidens
  - - Kunpania scopulusa
    - - Cryptodontia
        - - Daqingshanodon limbus
          - Keyseria benjamini
        - - Geikiidae
            - Idelesaurus tataricus
            - - Bulbasaurus phylloxyron
              - Geikiinae
                - Aulacephalodon bainii
                - - Pelanomodon moschops
                  - - Geikia elginensis
                    - Geikia locusticeps
          - - Mdomowabata trilobops
            - - Odontocyclops whaitsi
              - - Rhachiocephalidae
                  - Kitchinganomodon crassus
                  - Rhachiocephalus magnus
                - Oudenodontidae
                  - Oudenodon bainii
                  - - Tropidostoma dubium
                    - Australobarbarus spp.
      - Dicynodontoidea
        - Elphidae
          - Gordonia traquairi
          - - Interpresosaurus blomi
            - - Elph borealis
              - Katumbia parringtoni
        - other Dicynodontoidea
