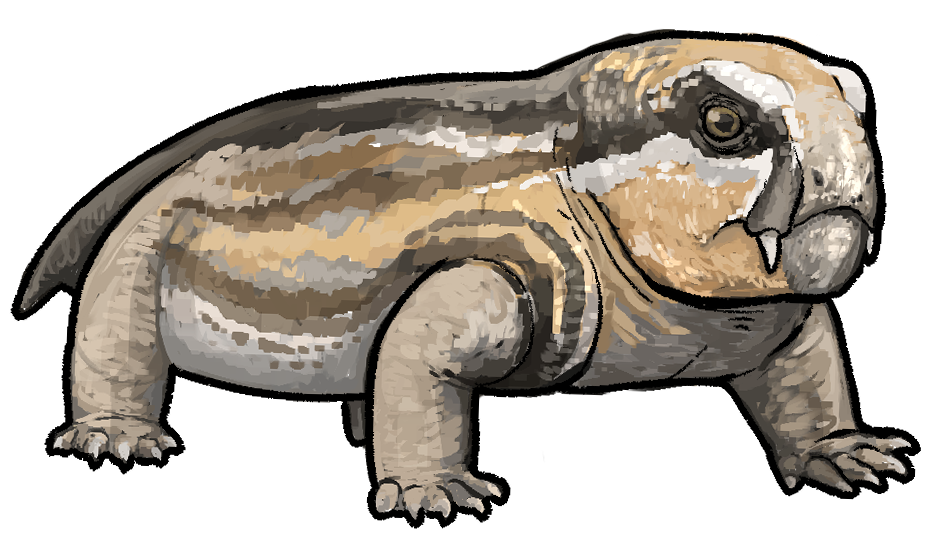
- Restoration of Eodicynodon oosthuizeni

Scientific classification
- Kingdom: Animalia
- Phylum: Chordata
- Clade: Synapsida
- Clade: Therapsida
- Clade: †Anomodontia
- Clade: †Dicynodontia
- Family: †Eodicynodontidae; Barry, 1974
- Genus: †Eodicynodon; Barry, 1974

Type species
- †E. oosthuizeni Barry, 1974

= Eodicynodon =

Eodicynodon Temporal range: Middle Permian to Late Permian

Extinct genus of dicynodonts

Eodicynodon (eo-, early or primitive, dicynodont) is an extinct genus of dicynodont therapsids, a highly diverse group of herbivorous synapsids that were widespread during the middle-late Permian and early Triassic. As its name suggests, Eodicynodon is the oldest and most primitive dicynodont yet identified, ranging from the middle to late Permian and possessing a mix of ancestral anomodont/therapsid features and derived dicynodont synapomorphies.

First described by paleontologist T. H. Barry in 1974, E. oosthuizeni is named after Roy Oosthuizen, the South African farmer who discovered the type specimen (a partial skull without the mandible) on his Cape Province farm between 1964 and 1970.

The Eodicynodon Assemblage Zone in South Africa is named after its presence there.

== Description ==
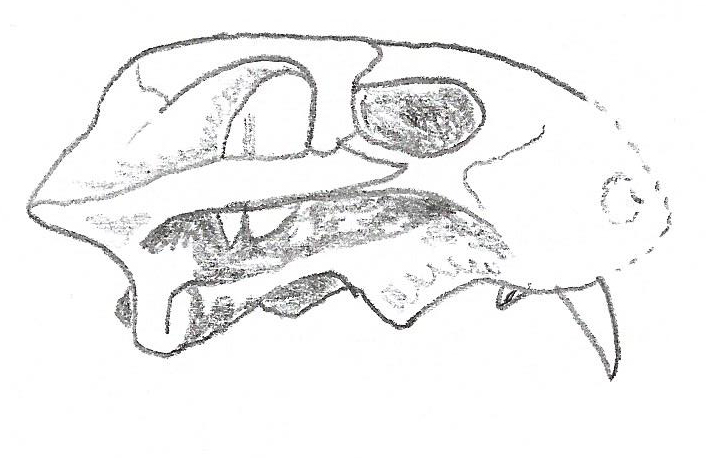
Illustration of the skull

Eodicynodon was a medium-sized dicynodont, at about 450 mm long and 150 mm high. While it had many features common to all dicynodonts, such as canine tusks and jaw structures related to the "cheek pivot system" of mastication, it also displayed a number of ancestral features more similar to some of its primitive therapsid relatives, which are listed below.

=== Palate/snout ===
While the premaxillary bones are fused in more derived dicynodonts, a thin suture extending dorsally up from the palatal facet reveals that they are paired in Eodicynodon, an ancestral feature they share with their primitive relatives Venyukovia, Otsheria, and Pelycosauria.

Similarly, while the vomers of later dicynodonts are fused, they are paired in Eodicynodon and together with the pterygoid border the intervomero-pterygoidal vacuity; in more derived dicynodonts, this vacuity is more posteriorly located and exclusively bordered by the pterygoid. These features are also present in more primitive relatives of dicynodonts, including Pristerodon, sphenacodont pelycosaurs, cotylosaurs, and Venyukovia.

=== Mastication ===
Dicynodonts were specialized herbivores that employed a unique “cheek pivot system” of mastication that created powerful shearing action upon closure of the jaw and subsequently ground mouth contents through a system of interlocking ridges and grooves formed from the palate and dentary.

Two morphological features, present already in Eodicynodon, made this motion possible. The first was a double convex jaw joint, wherein both the quadrate and articular formed convex condyles. As the jaw closed, the articular condyle of the lower jaw slid anterio-dorsally along the quadrate condyle, resulting in closure of the mouth from back to front as the posterior end of the mandible was elevated dorsally relative to the anterior end. Forward slide of the lower jaw was limited by the second morphological feature unique to dicynodonts, a pivot point created between the dentary groove and palatal notch upon closure of the jaw. The lower jaw would then move so that the articular condyle slid anterio-ventrally along the quadrate condyle, which would cause the mandible to pivot in such a way that the front of the mouth closed and the back opened.

== Discovery and geology ==
The South African Karoo Supergroup is a fossil-rich series of bedded shales that was continuously deposited beginning in the late Carboniferous through the early Jurassic. Though a diverse assemblage of dicynodonts appears early on in the Beaufort Group, the immediately preceding Ecca was long understood to be barren of fossils, despite a lack of geological evidence for a change in paleoenvironment from Ecca to Beaufort. From 1964 to 1970, the farmer Roy Oosthuizen, whose land was located in an area firmly established as Upper Ecca (Middle Permian), collected a number of nodules containing the remains of several therapsids, including several small dicynodonts and the partial skull that is the type specimen of Eodicynodon.

== Phylogeny ==
Below is a cladogram modified from Angielczyk and Rubidge (2010) showing the phylogenetic relationships of Dicynodontia:

- Dicynodontia
  - Eodicynodon
  - - Colobodectes
    - - Lanthanostegus
      - - Pylaecephalidae
          - Robertia
          - Diictodon
          - Prosictodon
        - - Chelydontops
          - Endothiodon
          - - Pristerodon
            - - Emydopoidea
                - Emydops
                - - - Myosaurus
                    - Kingoriidae
                      - Dicynodontoides
                      - Kombuisia
                  - Cistecephalidae
                    - Cistecephalus
                    - - Cistecephaloides
                      - Kawingasaurus
              - Pristerodontia
                - - Interpresosaurus
                  - Elph
                  - - Rhachiocephalus
                    - - Cryptodontidae
                        - Oudenodon
                        - - Tropidostoma
                          - Australobarbarus
                      - Geikiidae
                        - Odontocyclops
                        - - Idelesaurus
                          - - Aulacephalodon
                            - - Geikia
                              - Pelanomodon
                - Dicynodontoidea
                  - Katumbia
                  - - Delectosaurus
                    - - Dicynodon
                      - - Lystrosauridae
                        - - Kannemeyeriiformes
                          - Vivaxosaurus

== See also ==
- List of therapsids

== Sources ==
- The Origin and Evolution of Mammals (Oxford Biology) by T. S. Kemp
