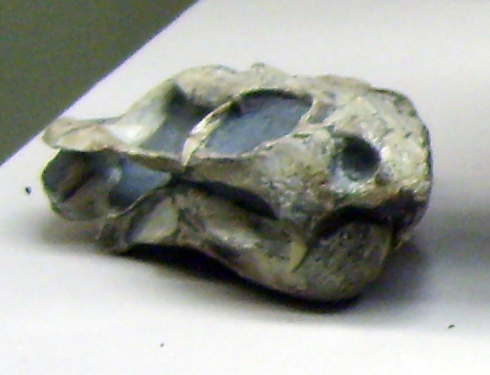
- Skull at the Museum für Naturkunde, Berlin

Scientific classification
- Domain: Eukaryota
- Kingdom: Animalia
- Phylum: Chordata
- Clade: Synapsida
- Clade: Therapsida
- Suborder: †Anomodontia
- Clade: †Dicynodontia
- Family: †Eumantellidae
- Genus: †Pristerodon; Huxley, 1868

Type species
- †Pristerodon mackayi Huxley, 1868

Synonyms
- Emydops longiceps Owen, 1876; Oudenodon raniceps Owen, 1876; Dicynodon trigoniceps Broom, 1904; Pristerodon brachyops (Broom, 1911); Diaelurodon whaitsi (Broom, 1911); Dicynodon pygmaeus Broom and Haughton, 1917; Emydops longus (Broom, 1921); Emydops parvus Broom, 1921; Emyduranus platyops Broom, 1921; Cerataelurus mirabilis Broom, 1931; Orophicephalus microrhynchus (Huene, 1931); Brachyuraniscus merwevillensis Broili & Schroeder, 1935; Brachyuraniscus reuningi Broili & Schroeder, 1935; Eurychororhinus boonstrai Broili & Schroeder, 1935; Synostocephalus vanhoepeni Broili & Schroeder, 1935; Emydops minimus Broom, 1935; Emyduranus gracilis Broom, 1935; Eumantellia mirus Broom, 1935; Emydops microdon Broom, 1936; Newtonella platyceps Broom, 1937; Dimetrodon siwerstrai Broom, 1940; Cryptocynodon schroederi Janensch, 1952; Emydops kitchingi Toerien, 1953; Emydops murraysburgensis Toerien, 1953; Hueneus oudebergensis Toerien, 1953; Parringtoniella broomi Toerien, 1953; Pristerodon buffaloensis Toerien, 1953

= Pristerodon =

Pristerodon Temporal range: Late Permian

Extinct genus of dicynodont therapsid from the late Permian

Pristerodon is an extinct genus of dicynodont therapsid from the Late Permian of South Africa, Zambia and India.

== Paleobiology ==
=== Brain and senses ===
Pristerodon were among the earliest land animals able to hear airborne sound as opposed to hearing via ground vibrations. A South African specimen studied with neutron tomography has shown evidence of an eardrum on its lower jaw with the implication that it was hearing impaired during the act of chewing. The specimen had a 3mm cavity for cochlea which transformed sound frequency ranges into nerve impulses sent on to the brain.

=== Ecology ===
Pristerodon has been found in the Kundaram Formation of India, Usili Formation of Tanzania, the Upper Madumabisa Mudstone Formation of Zambia, and the Teekloof Formation and Abrahamskraal Formation of South Africa.

== Phylogeny ==
Pristerodon in a cladogram modified from Angielczyk and Rubidge (2010) showing the phylogenetic relationships of Dicynodontia:

- Dicynodontia
  - Eodicynodon
  - - Colobodectes
    - - Lanthanostegus
      - - Pylaecephalidae
          - Robertia
          - Diictodon
          - Prosictodon
        - - Chelydontops
          - Endothiodon
          - - Pristerodon
            - - Emydopoidea
                - Emydops
                - - - Myosaurus
                    - Kingoriidae
                      - Dicynodontoides
                      - Kombuisia
                  - Cistecephalidae
                    - Cistecephalus
                    - - Cistecephaloides
                      - Kawingasaurus
              - Pristerodontia
                - - Interpresosaurus
                  - Elph
                  - - Rhachiocephalus
                    - - Cryptodontidae
                        - Oudenodon
                        - - Tropidostoma
                          - Australobarbarus
                      - Geikiidae
                        - Odontocyclops
                        - - Idelesaurus
                          - - Aulacephalodon
                            - - Geikia
                              - Pelanomodon
                - Dicynodontoidea
                  - Katumbia
                  - - Delectosaurus
                    - - Dicynodon
                      - - Lystrosauridae
                        - - Kannemeyeriiformes
                          - Vivaxosaurus

== See also ==
- List of therapsids
