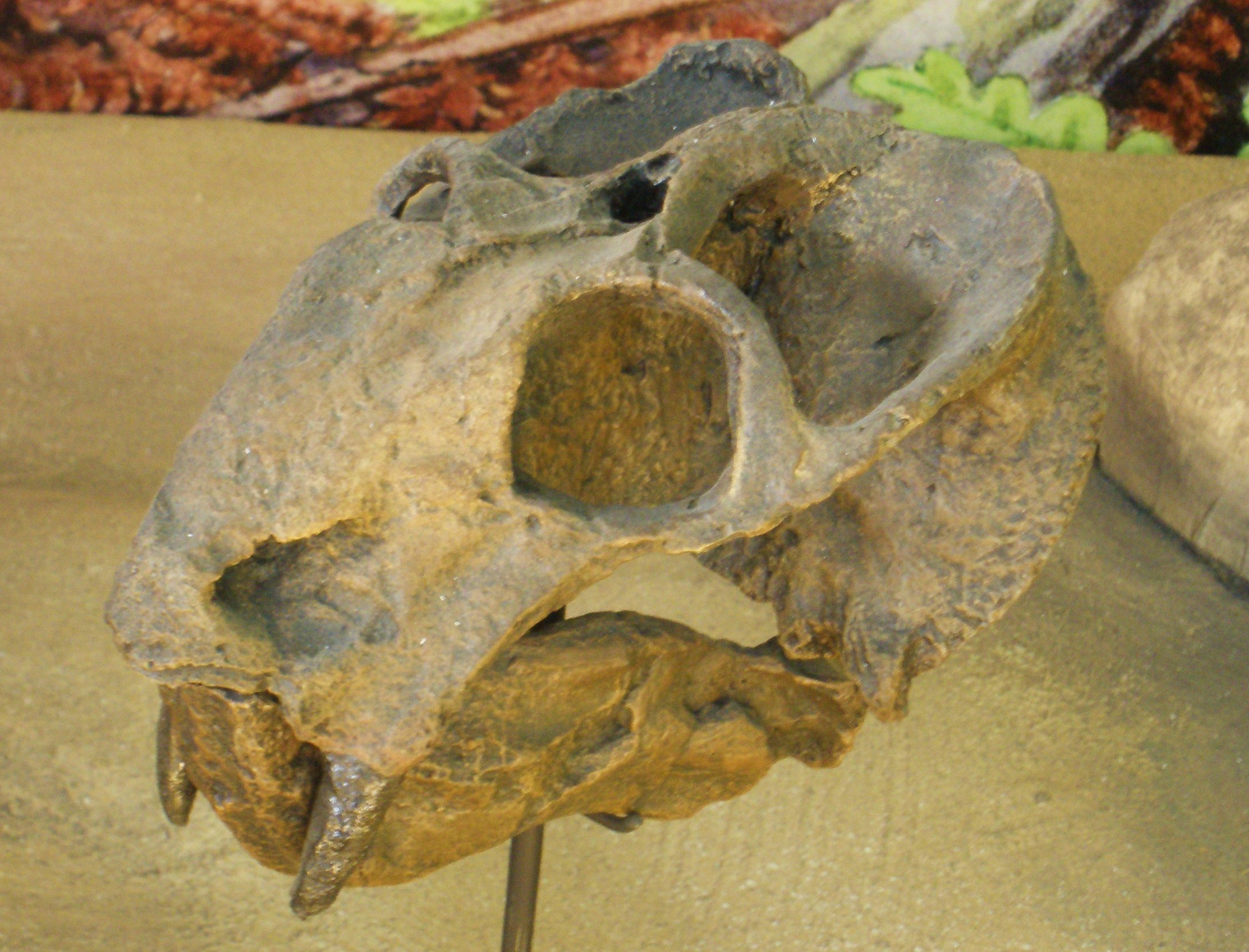
- Skull of Dicynodon

Scientific classification
- Kingdom: Animalia
- Phylum: Chordata
- Clade: Synapsida
- Clade: Therapsida
- Clade: †Anomodontia
- Clade: †Dicynodontia
- Clade: †Therochelonia
- Clade: †Bidentalia; Owen, 1876

Subgroups
- †Rastodon; †Elphidae; †Cryptodontia; †Dicynodontoidea

= Bidentalia =

Bidentalia Temporal range: Middle Permian - Norian, 265–208 Ma

Extinct clade of dicynodonts

Bidentalia is a group of dicynodont therapsids. Bidentalia was one of the first names used to describe dicynodonts; the group was established in 1876, while the name "bidentals" dates back as far as 1845. With the increasing prominence of phylogenetics, the group was redefined as a clade in 2009. Bidentalia is now considered a stem-based taxon that includes all taxa more closely related to Aulacephalodon bainii and Dicynodon lacerticeps than Emydops arctatus.

== History ==
In 1845, South African geologist Andrew Geddes Bain described the first known dicynodonts as "bidentals" for their two prominent tusks. "Bidental" was the first name ever used for a group of non-mammalian synapsids. The name Dicynodontia, which is more commonly used to refer to these animals, was erected by English paleontologist Richard Owen in 1860. Realizing that Bain's "bidentals" predated his "dicynodonts", Owen named Bidentalia in 1876 as a replacement name for Dicynodontia. Owen described Bidentalia as reptiles with "a long ever-growing tusk in each maxillary; premaxillaries connate, forming with the lower jaw a beak-shaped mouth, probably sheathed with horn. Sacrum of more than two vertebrae; trunk-vertebrae amphicoelian; limbs ambulatory." At this time, Bidentalia included three main species: Dicynodon lacerticeps, Dicynodon bainii, and Ptychognathus declivis. The two Dicynodon species were named in 1845, just before Bain described his bidentals. Ptychognathus was named in 1859, and is now called Lystrosaurus. In the following years Dicynodontia became the preferred name for these reptiles and Bidentalia quickly fell out of use.

Bidentalia was reinstated as a clade in 2009. It was used to include all therochelonians more closely related to Dicynodon than to emydopoids (a group of more basal dicynodonts). As a clade, Bidentalia forms a more inclusive group than it did under Owen's use. Owen's Bidentalia was equivalent to Dicynodontia, which today is used as a much larger group encompassing all dicynodonts. In its current use, Bidentalia includes two major subgroups, Cryptodontia and Dicynodontoidea.

== Evolution ==
Bidentalia originated in the Guadalupian epoch of the Permian and quickly spread worldwide, with early species known from both Brazil and Russia. However, they were conspicuously absent from Africa despite its well-known Permian fauna until the late Permian. The oldest and most basal known bidentalian is Rastodon.

=== Phylogeny ===
Bidentalia is divided into two major groups, Cryptodontia and Dicynodontoidea, as well as a small number of basal genera such as Elph and Rastodon However, Cryptodontia may be paraphyletic. Below is a cladogram showing the phylogeny of Bidentalia from a recent study, Kammerer et al. (2011):

- Dicynodontia
  - Eodicynodon
  - - Pylaecephalidae
    - - Eumantellidae
      - - Endothiodontidae
        - Therochelonia
          - Emydopoidea
            - Emydopidae
            - - Kingoriidae
              - Cistecephalidae
              - Myosauridae
          - Bidentalia
            - Cryptodontia
              - Rhachiocephalidae
              - - Oudenodontidae
                - Geikiidae
            - Dicynodontoidea
              - "Dicynodon"
              - - Lystrosauridae
                - Kannemeyeriiformes
                  - Shansiodontidae
                  - Kannemeyeriidae
                  - Stahleckeriidae
                  - Dinodontosauridae
