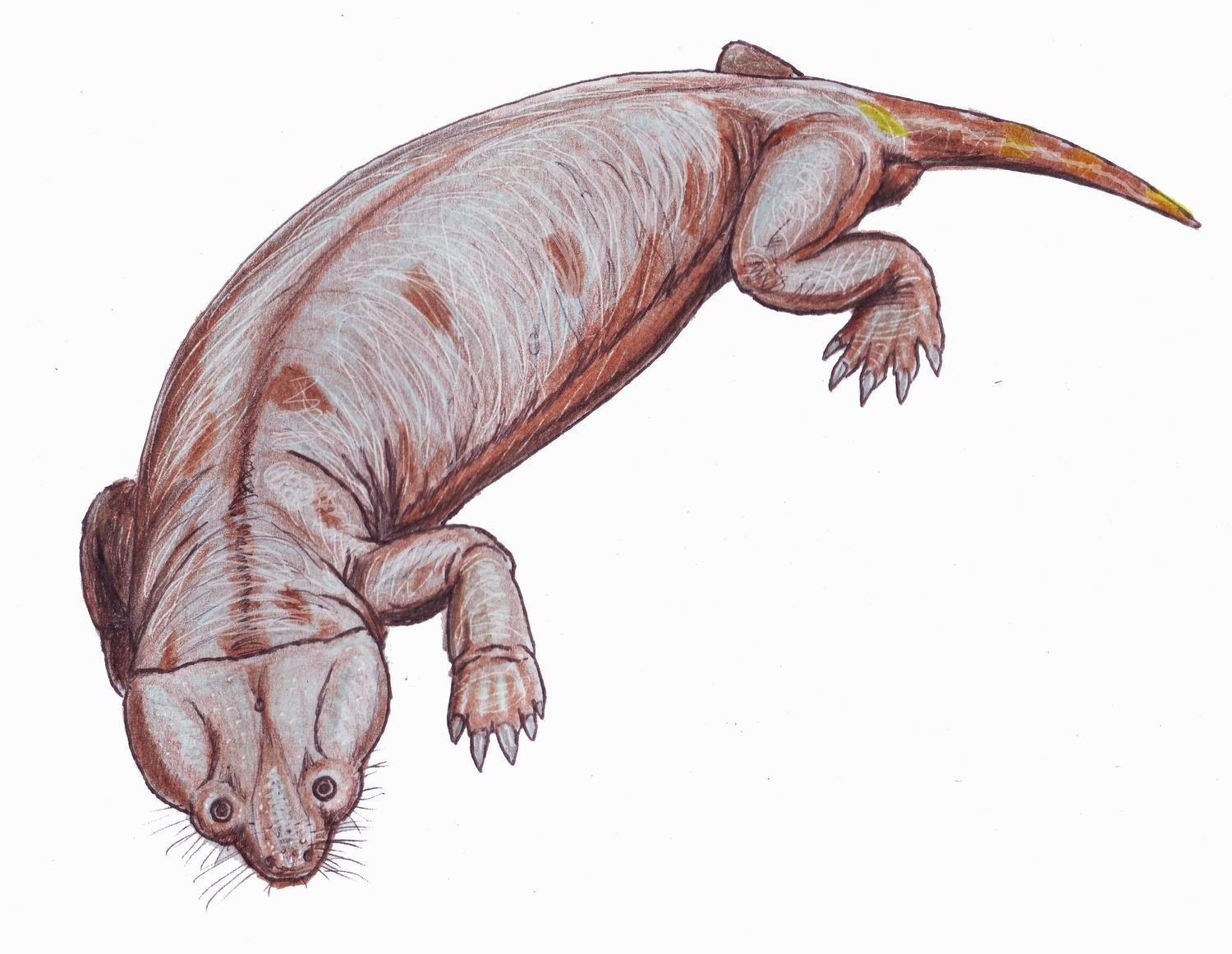
- Life restoration of Cistecephalus Cistecephalus microrhinus

Scientific classification
- Kingdom: Animalia
- Phylum: Chordata
- Clade: Synapsida
- Clade: Therapsida
- Clade: †Anomodontia
- Clade: †Dicynodontia
- Clade: †Therochelonia; Seeley, 1894

Subgroups
- †Emydopoidea; †Bidentalia

= Therochelonia =

Therochelonia Temporal range: Late Permian–Late Triassic

Extinct clade of dicynodonts

Therochelonia is a group of dicynodont therapsids. The group was named by British paleontologist Harry Seeley in 1894 and fell into disuse in the following century. Therochelonia was redefined as a node-based clade in 2009. It is defined as the last common ancestor of Cistecephalus microrhinus and Dicynodon lacerticeps, and all of its descendants. Below is a simplified cladogram from Kammerer et al. (2011) showing the phylogenetic placement of Therochelonia:

- Dicynodontia
  - Eodicynodon
  - - Pylaecephalidae
    - - Eumantellidae
      - - Endothiodontidae
        - Therochelonia
          - Emydopoidea
            - Emydopidae
            - - Kingoriidae
              - Cistecephalidae
              - Myosauridae
          - Bidentalia
            - Cryptodontia
              - Rhachiocephalidae
              - - Oudenodontidae
                - Geikiidae
            - Dicynodontoidea
              - "Dicynodon"
              - - Lystrosauridae
                - Kannemeyeriiformes
                  - Shansiodontidae
                  - Kannemeyeriidae
                  - Stahleckeriidae
                  - Dinodontosauridae
