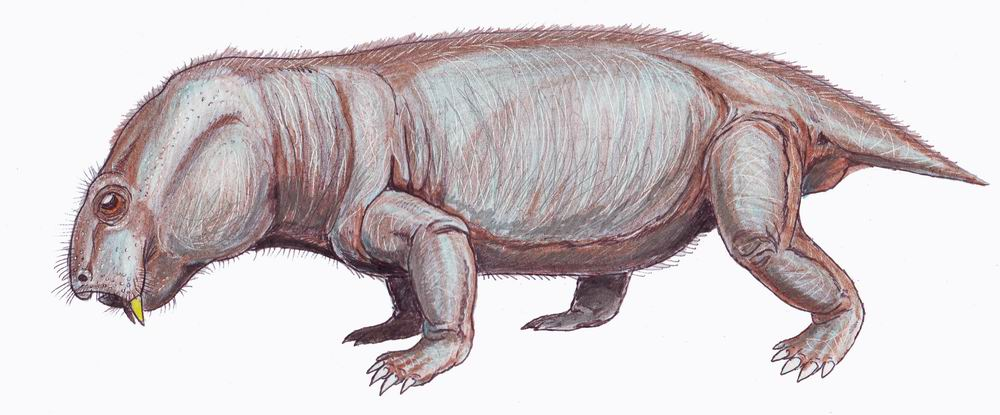
- Restoration of Dicynodontoides recurvidens

Scientific classification
- Kingdom: Animalia
- Phylum: Chordata
- Clade: Synapsida
- Clade: Therapsida
- Clade: †Anomodontia
- Clade: †Dicynodontia
- Family: †Kingoriidae
- Genus: †Dicynodontoides; Broom 1940

Species
- †D. kubwa Shipps, Sidor & Angielczyk, 2025; †D. nowacki (von Huene 1942); †D. recurvidens (Owen 1876) (type)

Synonyms
- Kingoria Cox 1959

= Dicynodontoides =

Dicynodontoides Temporal range: Late Permian, 260–251 Ma

Extinct genus of dicynodonts

Dicynodontoides is a genus of small to medium-bodied, herbivorous, emydopoid dicynodonts from the Late Permian. The name Dicynodontoides references its “dicynodont-like” appearance (dicynodont = two-dog-tooth) due to the caniniform tusks featured by most members of this infraorder. Kingoria, a junior synonym, has been used more widely in the literature than the more obscure Dicynodontoides, which is similar-sounding to another distantly related genus of dicynodont, Dicynodon. Three species are recognized: D. recurvidens from South Africa, and D. nowacki and D. kubwa from Tanzania.

Dicynodontoides is primarily known from fossil localities in South Africa and Tanzania, though several specimens unidentified to the species level are known from Zambia, Malawi, and India. Unlike several other members of the remarkably disparate emydopoid clade, Dicynodontoides did not survive into the Triassic, and its temporal distribution is restricted to the Late Permian.

== History and discovery ==
Dicynodontoides was first described by Owen in 1876 based on a poorly preserved, but fairly complete skull and mandible, and was originally referred to the genus Dicynodon. The specimen was found in Fort Beaufort, South Africa, in the Dicynodon Assemblage Zone of the Karoo Basin. However, it wasn't until Broom's 1940 publication including Dicynodontoides parringtoni, a junior synonym for Owen's D. recurvidens, that the genus was used. A second species, produced by the Usili Formation, D. nowacki, was first described by von Huene in 1942 from Kingori Mountain, Tanzania, and was originally referred to as Dicynodon nowacki.

Cox pointed out several features, most notably the hindlimb and girdle morphology, that differentiated this genus from other members of Dicynodon, and erected a new genus, Kingoria. Since, many researchers have attempted to place these ambiguous specimens within Dicynodontia. Not until the last decade has significant light been shed upon the matter, solidifying the place of the senior synonym, Dicynodontoides, and affirming the presence of only two species, D. recurvidens and D. nowacki.

== Description ==
Skull of Dicynodontoides nowacki in left anterolateral view

Skull of Dicynodontoides nowacki in dorsal view

=== Skull ===
In dorsal view, the skull is oval in shape with a broad snout, and reaches its widest point posterior of the pineal foramen, which is slightly raised. Its intertemporal bar is narrower than the interorbital bar. Although belonging to the infraorder Dicynodontia, the caniniform tusks may be present or absent in the genus. When present, they are fairly gracile. Post-caniniform keels on the maxilla are present even in specimens lacking tusks. However, pre and post-canine teeth are always absent in this genus.

Dicynodontoides features a jaw symphysis that narrows anteriorly, tapering to a blunt point, and forming a shovel-shaped snout, which contrasting with the normally flattened area present in other dicynodont forms. Its palatine bone is smooth and significantly reduced to the lateral border of the internal nostril, having important implications for food processing (see below).

=== Post-cranial skeleton ===
Dicynodont evolution is often observed through changes in skull morphology due to the generalized post-cranial morphology in a majority of dicynodonts. However, Dicynodontoides is an exception to this statement. Although its size (small-medium) is unexceptional, aspects of the post-cranial morphology are very specialized and have been studied thoroughly.

Most notable of this specialization is the hindlimb morphology. The pelvic girdle consists of a small pubis and an ilium with anteriorly extensive but posteriorly rudimentary processes. The femoral head is offset from the bone, forming an s-shape, and the attachments for the ilio-femoralis muscles are significant. The foot is elongate with pointed claws and does not appear to be particularly specialized.

The shoulder girdle and forelimbs are more representative of Dicynodontia as a whole than the hindlimbs. The girdle is high and narrow, reflecting a reduction in the backward-forward pulling muscles, which would have been situated above and below the humerus. The humerus suggests an emphasis of long-axis rotation, a much more conservative morphology than that of the hindlimb structure.

In sum, the structure of the palate, the lower jaw, and the sacrum distinguish the morphology of Dicynodontoides from its Permo-Triassic dicynodont counterparts.

== Paleobiology ==
=== Feeding ecology ===
The dicynodont feeding mechanism, though conservative, is often a variation of a generalized pattern. All members of this infraorder were likely herbivorous, though both the exact nature of this dietary pattern (i.e. the inclusion of cones, roots, etc.) and the possible degree of omnivory or insectivory is not fully understood.

Based on the habitual downward orientation of its skull, Dicynodontoides was likely a substrate-targeted feeder, or grazer, rather than a browser. The narrow anterior portion of the jaw could have allowed highly mobile movement of the tongue for the collection of surface vegetation, though other explanations for this feature are equally possible (see below).

In most members of Dicynodontia, both the reduced dentition and sharp cutting edge around the anterior end of the lower jaw suggest a scissor-like mode of food collection. After collection, mastication would have occurred via a back-and-forth grinding process. However, Dicynodontoides strays from this general pattern of food processing. Its caniniform blades, though periodically absent in this genus, are likely to have functioned as a paper cutter. However, the short mouth, blunted edges of the lower jaw, and the lack of a tough palatal surface against which the jaw could grind downplay the significance of this apparent shearing component. The morphology of the jaw hinge prevents the anterior end of the lower jaw from meeting the palate, only allowing palatal contact with the more posterior portion of the dentary. While there is little possibility of any transverse movement in the lower jaw, a crushing function is possible, and consistent with the feeding mechanism observed in other Emydopoids.

Unlike other members of the infraorder, the front of the lower jaw is not flattened, but curved and tapering anteriorly. Cox suggests this feature, as well as the strong jaw musculature, indicated by the large lateral wing on the dentary, may point towards grubbing in the dirt for food. However, subsequent analyses of other specimens have not featured the same degree of bluntness of the anterior end of the lower jaw, and call this theory into question. Nevertheless, the significant reduction of the tough, horny covering of the palate in Dicynodontoides suggests that whatever it may have grubbed up and consumed would have been both small, soft, and required minimal preparation. Roots or small invertebrates could provide the answer to this problem. Nevertheless, the exact nature of the feeding ecology of Dicynodontoides continues to elude researchers.

=== Locomotion ===
While most dicynodonts fall under a generalized body shape, Dicynodontoides departs from the standard. This genus was likely adapted to fast, agile locomotion.

Muscle restoration of the acetabular-femoral articulation reveals the diverging pattern of locomotion of Dicynodontoides from the typical sprawling gait of most Permian dicynodonts. The hindlimb would have been retracted by a simple rotation of the femoral head, playing a more significant role in the retraction component of the gait than in most other dicynodonts. This feature, though rare in Permian dicynodonts, becomes increasingly more common in the Triassic forms, and Dicynodontoides represents one of many incremental transitions toward upright hindlimb posture in the dicynodont locomotor pattern.

However, the glenohumeral articulation suggests a more conservative forelimb and girdle morphology than that of the pelvic girdle. Evidence points toward a sprawling position of the forelimbs, with an emphasis on long-axis rotation. This likely allowed for manoeuvrability, while the hindlimbs powered the animal.

=== Metabolism and thermoregulation ===
Members of Dicynodontia were most likely ectothermic. However, inertial homeothermy may have been possible, though less likely. These ectothermal dicynodonts would have had lower feeding demands than extant endothermal mammalian herbivores.

The large pineal foramen apparent in the skull roof in dicynodonts, including Dicynodontoides, is also found in lizards. This light-sensitive organ played a crucial role in increasing the rate of digestion in these herbivores. The pineal foramen would have monitored solar intensity, allowing the correlation of the dicynodont's daily cycle of activity with the cycling availability of solar radiation throughout the day. As Cox points out, this would have enabled the animal to function nearer the upper end of its optimal temperature range.

=== Histology ===
A study conducted by Botha-Brink and Angielczyk reviewed the bone histology of Permo-Triassic dicynodonts. Their findings suggest that Dicynodontoides had a slower growth rate than other dicynodonts. The presence of LAGs, or growth rings, in most dicynodonts indicates that growth rates decreased around sexual maturity. However, the presence of these growth rings in Dicynodontoides at only 47% adult size is significantly earlier than the general pattern. Moderately vascularized fibrolamellar bone and small, narrow vascular canals suggest a relatively decreased intake of oxygen and nutrients compared with other dicynodonts. This is consistent with the slow rate of growth of Dicynodontoides.

== Species ==
Recent studies have aimed to clarify the ambiguity surrounding the taxonomic classification of Dicynodontoides and its junior synonym Kingoria (see). Part of this effort has included an analysis of the two species currently comprising the genus, D. nowacki and D. recurvidens.

D. recurvidens is known only from the South African Karoo Basin. It is distinguished from the other member of its genus based on a generally smaller and more gracile morphology. It typically has a relatively smaller head (mean = 120.9 mm (4.8 in)), more frequently features tusks (69% of specimens), and a more gracile humerus with narrower proximal and distal ends and a prominent humeral head. Additionally, D. recurvidens exhibits slight differences in the fibular and pelvic morphologies.

D. nowacki is known exclusively from the Ruhuhu Basin of Tanzania. This species is generally recognized by a larger and more robust morphology. It has a larger head (mean = 161.1 mm (6.3 in)), often lacks tusks (featured in only 38% of specimens), features a flatter deltopectoral crest, and differs from D. recurvidens by its robust humeral morphology.

D. recurvidens has previously been referred to as Dicynodon recurvidens, Dicynodontoides parringtoni, Kingoria recurvidens, Udenodon gracilis, Dicynodon gracilis, Kingoria gracilis, Dicynodon howardi, Kingoria howardi, and Dicynodon clarencei according to more recent analyses of these specimens.

The same studies have shown that previous references to Dicynodon nowacki, Dicynodontoides parringtoni, and Kingoria nowacki can be attributed to Dicynodontoides nowacki.

== Classification ==
Dicynodontoides belongs to the clade Emydopoidea, a sub-group of Dicynodontia. Dicynodontoides and its Triassic sister taxa (see Kombuisia, Niassodon) comprise the family Kingoriidae. A comprehensive taxonomic revision of Dicynodon and subsequent phylogenetic analysis of Dicynodontia reveal these relationships within Anomodontia below:

- 1
  - Biseridens
  - - - Anomocephalus
      - Tiarajudens
    - - Patranomodon
      - - 2
          - Suminia
          - - Otsheria
            - Ulemica
        - 3
          - - Galepus
            - Galechirus
          - - Galeops
            - 4
              - "Eodicynodon" oelofseni
              - - - Eodicynodon oosthuizeni
                  - Colobodectes
                - - Lanthanostegus
                  - - Chelydontops
                    - - Endothiodon
                      - - Pristerodon
                        - 5
                          - 6
                            - 7
                              - Diictodon
                              - - Eosimops
                                - - Prosictodon
                                  - Robertia
                            - 8
                              - Emydops
                              - 9
                                - 10
                                  - Dicynodontoides
                                  - Kombuisia
                                - - Myosaurus
                                  - 11
                                    - Cistecephalus
                                    - - Cistecephaloides
                                      - Kawingasaurus
                          - 12
  1 Anomodontia, 2 Venyukovioidea, 3 Chainosauria, 4 Dicynodontia, 5 Therochelonia, 6 Diictodontia, 7 Pylaecephalidae, 8 Emydopoidea, 9 Kistecephalia, 10 Kingoriidae, 11 Cistecephalidae, 12 Bidentalia

== Stratigraphic and geographic range ==
Dicynodontoides is primarily known from the Upper Permian formations of the Karoo Basin of South Africa (D. recurvidens) and the Ruhuhu Basin of Tanzania (D. nowacki), both of which have been stratigraphically correlated. The stratigraphic range of D. recurvidens begins in the Teekloof Formation of the Karoo Basin in the upper Pristerognathus Assemblage Zone (below the previously assumed Cistecephalus Assemblage Zone), although the genus seems to have been particularly rare below the Cistecephalus Zone. Its last appearance occurs in the upper Dicynodon Assemblage Zone from the Balfour Formation of the Karoo Basin. However, whether or not Dicynodontoides was a victim of the end-Permian biotic crisis or became extinct previous to this event remains unclear despite collecting efforts near the Permo-Triassic boundary.

A specimen belonging to Dicynodontoides was found in the Upper Permian Kundaram Formation of the Pranhita-Godavari Valley of India, but has not been identified to the species level.

Similarly, two specimens have been identified as Dicynodontoides from the Chiweta Beds of Malawi. Whether these represent a previous or new species remains unknown, and the age of the Chiweta Beds has yet to be sufficiently constrained.

Additionally, a Zambian specimen collected from the Luangwa Basin, likely correlating with the Cistecephalus Assemblage Zone of South Africa, was rediscovered and identified as belonging to the genus.

== Paleoenvironment ==
Although areas outside of South Africa and Tanzania have not produced as many specimens of Dicynodontoides, it is safe to assume these southern Pangaean continents were home to similar habitats which were colonized by Dicynodontoides and its relatives during the Late Permian. The Cistecephalus Assemblage Zone and its stratigraphic correlates, although trending toward more arid conditions, can be categorized as a terrain of extensive flats covered by crisscrossing channels. Concentrations of plant and animal life would have gathered around these river banks where rich soil would have provided plenty of vegetation and good conditions for substrate-targeted feeders.

== See also ==
- Therapsids
- Anomondonts
- Dicynodonts
- Emydopoidea
- Kingoriidae
- Kombuisia
- Niassodon
