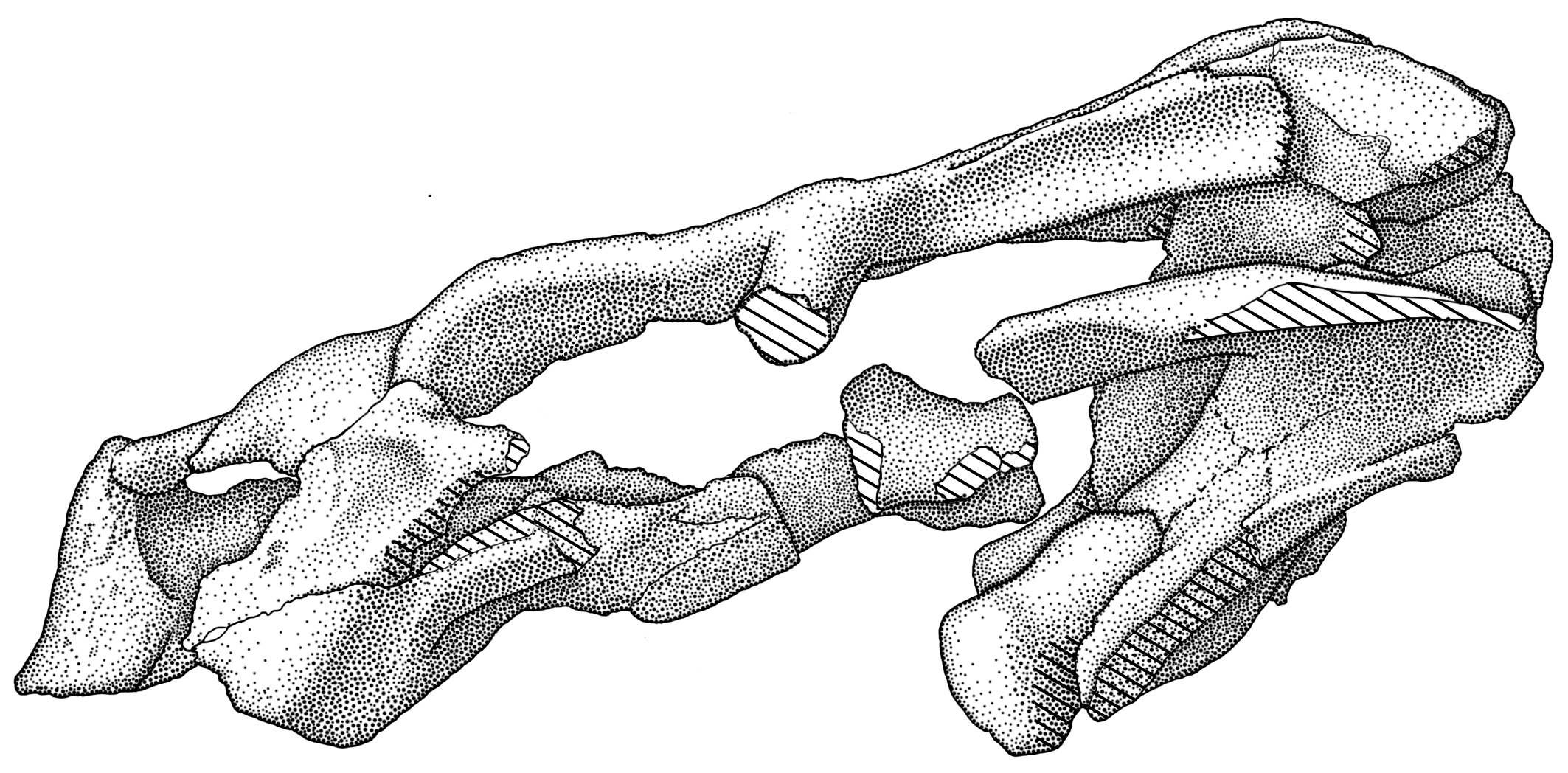
- Illustration of the holotype cranium of Mdomowabata trilobops (NMT RB156) in left lateral view

Scientific classification
- Kingdom: Animalia
- Phylum: Chordata
- Clade: Synapsida
- Clade: Therapsida
- Clade: †Anomodontia
- Clade: †Dicynodontia
- Genus: †Mdomowabata
- Species: †M. trilobops

Binomial name
- †Mdomowabata trilobops Angielczyk and Otoo, 2025

= Mdomowabata =

Mdomowabata Temporal range: Late Permian

Extinct genus of dicynodonts

Mdomowabata is an extinct genus of dicynodont that lived in Tanzania during the Lopingian epoch.

== Description ==
The type species, Mdomowabata trilobops, is diagnosed by its transversely expanded caniniform process of the maxilla with a bluntly rounded ventral tip, its possession of a hatchet-shaped exposure of the postfrontal bone on the skull's dorsal surface, its wide dorsal exposure of its parietals, its intertemporal portion of the postorbital being vertically oriented and possessing a concave lateral surface, its skull roof possessing a triangular exposure of the postparietal, its low and close-set anterior median palatal ridges, its large palatine pad that possesses both a rugose posterior section and a smoother anterior section flush with the premaxillary secondary palate, its symphyseal region of the mandible being anteroposteriorly short and transversely broad, its paired nasal bosses, and its possession of a round muscle scar anterior to the external mandibular fenestra.
