= Kitchinganomodon =

Kitchinganomodon Temporal range: Late Permian

Scientific classification
- Kingdom: Animalia
- Phylum: Chordata
- Clade: Synapsida
- Clade: Therapsida
- Clade: †Anomodontia
- Clade: †Dicynodontia
- Family: †Rhachiocephalidae
- Genus: †Kitchinganomodon; Maisch, 2002

Type species
- †Platycyclops crassus Broom, 1948

Extinct genus of dicynodonts

Kitchinganomodon is a genus of dicynodont from Late Permian (Wuchiapingian) of South Africa.
