= Lanthanostegus =

Lanthanostegus Temporal range: Late Permian 265.1–259.9 Ma

Scientific classification
- Domain: Eukaryota
- Kingdom: Animalia
- Phylum: Chordata
- Clade: Synapsida
- Clade: Therapsida
- Suborder: †Anomodontia
- Clade: †Dicynodontia
- Genus: †Lanthanostegus; Modesto et al., 2003

Type species
- †Lanthanostegus mohoii Modesto et al., 2002

Extinct genus of dicynodonts

Lanthanostegus is an extinct genus of non-mammalian synapsids from the Capitanian Tapinocephalus Assemblage Zone, Koonap Formation (Beaufort Group) of South Africa. The type and the only species is Lanthanostegus mohoii.

== Taxonomic history ==
The animal was named as Lanthanocephalus mohoii by Modesto et al. in 2002 but was recombined as Lanthanostegus mohoii in 2003, as the genus Lanthanocephalus was preoccupied by a coral.

== Phylogeny ==
The topology follows Duhamel et al. (2024).

- Dicynodontia
  - Eodicynodon
  - - Colobodectes
    - - Lanthanostegus
      - - Pylaecephalidae
        - - - Endothiodontia
            - Emydopoidea
          - - Pristerodon
            - Bidentalia

== See also ==
- List of therapsids
