= Emydopidae =

Emydopidae Temporal range: Permian

Scientific classification
- Kingdom: Animalia
- Phylum: Chordata
- Clade: Synapsida
- Clade: Therapsida
- Clade: †Anomodontia
- Clade: †Dicynodontia
- Superfamily: †Emydopoidea
- Family: †Emydopidae; Van Hoepen, 1934

Genera
- †Compsodon; †Emydops

Extinct family of synapsids

Emydopidae is a family of dicynodont therapsids.
