= Rhachiocephalidae =

Rhachiocephalidae Temporal range: Late Permian

Scientific classification
- Kingdom: Animalia
- Phylum: Chordata
- Clade: Synapsida
- Clade: Therapsida
- Clade: †Anomodontia
- Clade: †Dicynodontia
- Clade: †Cryptodontia
- Family: †Rhachiocephalidae; Maisch, 2000

Genera
- Kitchinganomodon; Rhachiocephalus

Synonyms
- Pelorocyclopinae Broom, 1935; Pelorocyclopini King, 1988

Extinct family of dicynodonts

Rhachiocephalidae is an extinct family of dicynodont therapsids. It includes two genera from the Late Permian of southern Africa, Rhachiocephalus and Kitchinganomodon. Rhachiocephalids were the largest dicynodonts in the Permian, although the kannemeyeriiform dicynodonts of the Late Triassic grew to larger sizes. Rhachiocephalids are also unusual in that they have long, low skulls.
