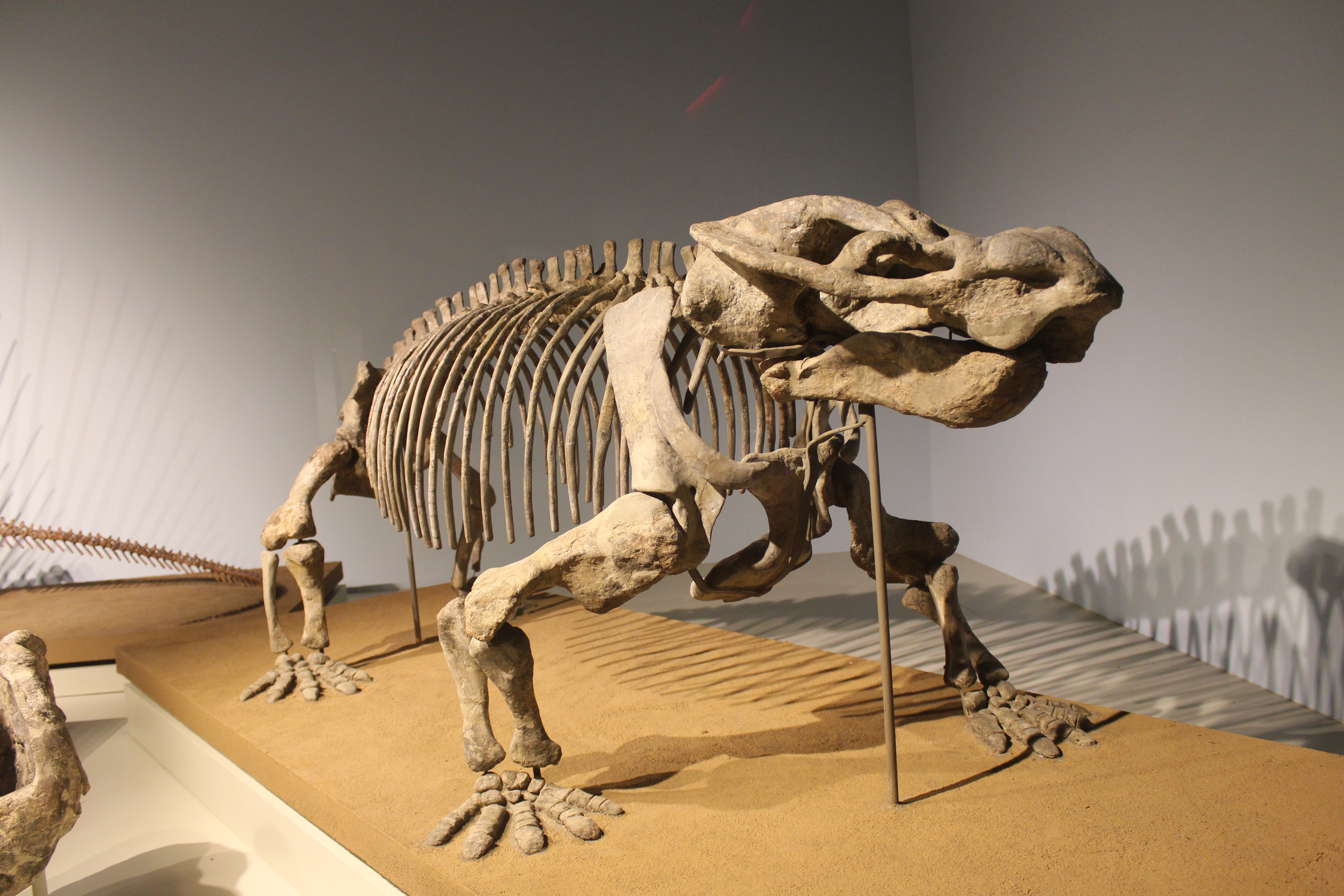
- Skeleton of A. peavoti in the Field Museum of Natural History

Scientific classification
- Kingdom: Animalia
- Phylum: Chordata
- Clade: Synapsida
- Clade: Therapsida
- Clade: †Anomodontia
- Clade: †Dicynodontia
- Family: †Geikiidae
- Genus: †Aulacephalodon; Seeley, 1898

Type species
- Aulacephalodon bainii Seeley, 1898 (type)

Species
- †A. bainii Seeley, 1898; †A. kapoliwacela Thomas, Angielczyk & Peecook, 2025; †?A. peavoti Broom, 1921

Synonyms
- †Dicynodon bainii Owen, 1844; †Dicynodon tigriceps Owen, 1844; †Dicynodon laticeps Broom, 1912; †Bainia peavoti Broom, 1921; †Bainia haughtoni Broom, 1921; †A. latissimus Broom, 1932; †A. nesamanni Broom, 1936; †A. nodosus Van Hoepen, 1934; †A. luckhoffi Broom, 1937; †A. hartzenbergi Broom, 1937; †A. coatoni Broom, 1941; †A. brodiei Broom, 1941; †A. cadlei Broom, 1948; †A. pricei Broom and George, 1950; †A. vanderhorsti Broom and George, 1950

= Aulacephalodon =

Aulacephalodon Temporal range: Late Permian (Wuchiapingian to Changhsingian), 256.6–253 Ma

Extinct genus of dicynodonts

Aulacephalodon ("furrow-head tooth") is an extinct genus of medium-sized dicynodonts, or non-mammalian synapsids, that lived during late Permian period. Individuals of Aulacephalodon are commonly found in the Lower Beaufort Group of the Karoo Supergroup of South Africa. Rising to dominance during the Late Permian, Aulacephalodon was among the largest terrestrial vertebrate herbivores until its extinction during a turnover event. Three species are typically recognized, the type species, A. bainii (named in 1898), a second species, A. peavoti (named in 1921), and a third species, A. kapoliwacela (named in 2025). However, debate exists among paleontologists if A. peavoti is a true member of the genus Aulacephalodon. Aulacephalodon belongs to the family Geikiidae, a family of dicynodonts generally characterized by their short, broad skulls and large nasal bosses. Sexual dimorphism has been identified in A. bainii.

== Etymology ==
The name Aulacephalodon combines the Greek words aulak- (aulax), meaning "a furrow", kephale, meaning "head," and odon, meaning tooth. Together, Aulacephalodon means "furrow-head tooth." The species Aulacephalodon bainii was named in honor of Andrew Geddes Bain (1797-1864), a Scottish geologist and road engineer who is credited with discovering the first dicynodont skull in South Africa.

== Description ==
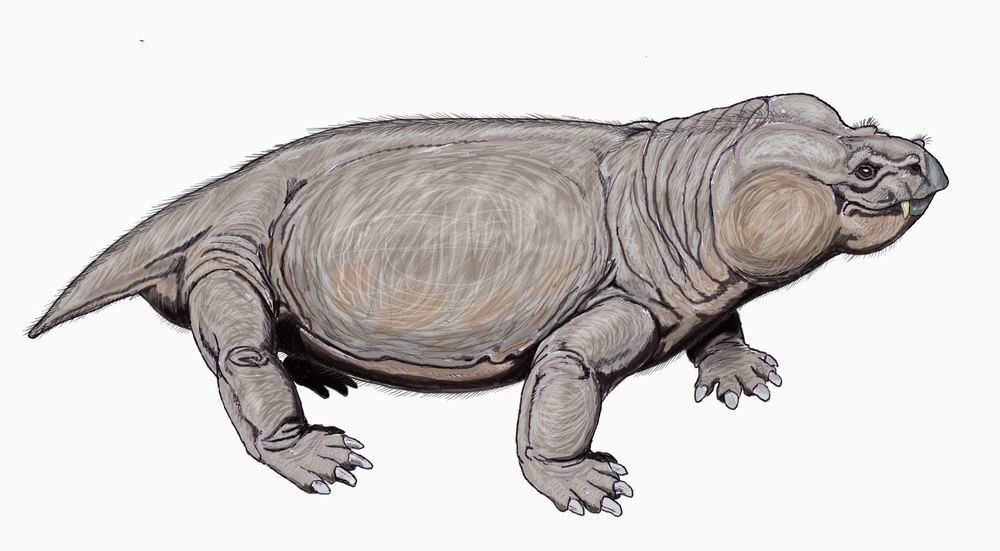
Life restoration of A. bainii.

Aulacephalodon is considered to be medium-sized relative to other dicynodont species, unique to other dicynodont species due to the canine tusks they possessed. Fossilization tends to have preserved only skulls and complete or fragmented bones of Aulacephalodon bainii, requiring paleontologists to use the unique features of the cranium when identifying specimens believed to belong to the genus. Aulacephalodon had short, broad skulls with a recorded range of 135 mm to 410 mm. Comparison of juvenile and mature individuals suggest that Aulacephalodon demonstrated a positive allometric growth pattern for their cranial features and a negative allometric growth pattern for their tusk and orbit size as ontogenetic age increases. Disproportionately large eyes in juveniles of a species is considered a characteristic of higher vertebrates. Diagnostic features of Aulacephalodon include (1) the size of their nasal bosses, (2) the shape and articulation of cranial bones, and (3) the length-breadth ration of the skull. The most complete restoration of Aulacephalodon is a skeleton of A. peavoti from the Field Museum of Natural History in Chicago.

=== Putative trackways ===
A set of footprints was found in the Teekloof Formation of the Beaufort Group by C.S. MacRae (1990), believing to have been made by either Aulacephalodon or the related Rhachiocephalus. Biostratigraphy placed the formation that contained the tracks within the Cistecephalus Assemblage Zone. Two sets of tracks were found, most likely belonging to two different individuals, with a pace approximately 600–650 mm in length. The organism that made the tracks was a large, and heavily padded, homopodus quadruped with a short tail. The tracks had a width of 800 mm, which when combined with the short stride length suggests Aulacephalodon, or Rhachiocephalus, was an inefficient walker.

An additional set of trackways was found at the Asante Sana game preserve near Petersburg in the Balfour Formation of the Beaufort Group. The morphology of the manus tracks, referred to the ichnospecies Dicynodontipus icelsi, compares well with the manus of Aulacephalodon.

== Discovery and naming ==
=== Origins of Aulacephalodon ===
Controversy over the number of species belonging to the genus Aulacephalodon has existed since the first specimens were discovered. The majority of specimens found were fragments, making proper diagnosis difficult for many of the specimens. Owen (1844) first described members of this genus as Dicynodon bainii, with five more species of dicynodont being discovered in subsequent years. Seeley (1898) divided Dicynodon into two subgenera and created the subgenus Aulacephalodon, suggesting all dicynodonts with a short snout and wide skull should be included in the subgenus. Two additional dicynodont species were discovered by Broom in 1912 and 1913. Broom (1921) also proposed a new subgenus of Dicynodon, Bainia, to describe tusked members of Dicynodon. When Broom finally recognized Seeley's subgenus, Aulacephalodon, as a valid genus in 1932. However, the spelling was altered to Aulacocephalodon. The incorrect genus Aulacocephalodon was used for many years until the correct spelling was pointed out by Keyser (1969). At least 17 species have been described as members of Aulacephalodon, however it is noted many of the features used to distinguish between the different species are size-dependent and highly susceptible to distortion. This has resulted in Aulacephalodon bainii being recognized as the type species of the genus, with the previous 17 species described as synonymous members of the species at various stages of growth.

=== Aulacephalodon bainii and Aulacephalodon peavoti ===
When Aulacephalodon peavoti was first described, the cranium of one specimen was compared to Aulacephalodon bainii to determine if A. peavoti can accurately be described as Aulacephalodon. The most distinct difference between A. bainii and A. peavoti is that specimens of A. peavoti are not found to possess tusks, which is a notable feature of A. bainii and Aulacephalodon. A. peavoti is also found to have a wider and more upright scapula blade compared to A. bainii, with deeper fossa on the proximal end of the scapula. While both species share some similar post-cranial features, there are numerous differences in the shapes of various girdle and forelimb elements prevents paleontologists from definitively recognizing A. peavoti as a member of Aulacephalodon.

== Paleobiology ==
=== Diet ===
Aulacephalodon skulls show the transverse anterior tip of their short snout is reinforced by the palatal ridges and ridges on the snout, resulting in biting action restricted to the tip of their jaws. The restricted jaw motion and presence of a horny beak structure suggests that Aulacephalodon were herbivores. Based on the arid climate of the Cistecephalus Zone, Aulacephalodon is thought to have fed on the stems of woody plants present in the region. The most commonly occurring plants in the region, Schizoneura and Phyllotheca, would have been available to Aulacephalodon to feed on. Tollman et al. (1980) suggests that as a function of their ontogenetically increasing size, the breadth of their occupied niche increased throughout their life that resulted in changes to the size and type of food Aulacephalodon obtained. A similar phenomenon is observed in modern genera Alligator and Crocodylus.

Compared to the related Oudenodon and Rhachiocephalus, Aulacephalodon bore differently-specialized biting mechanisms; Aulacephalodon has been hypothesized to have bit using the anterior tips of the jaws, while Oudenodon and Rhachiocephalus bit using the sides of the beak.

=== Sexual dimorphism ===
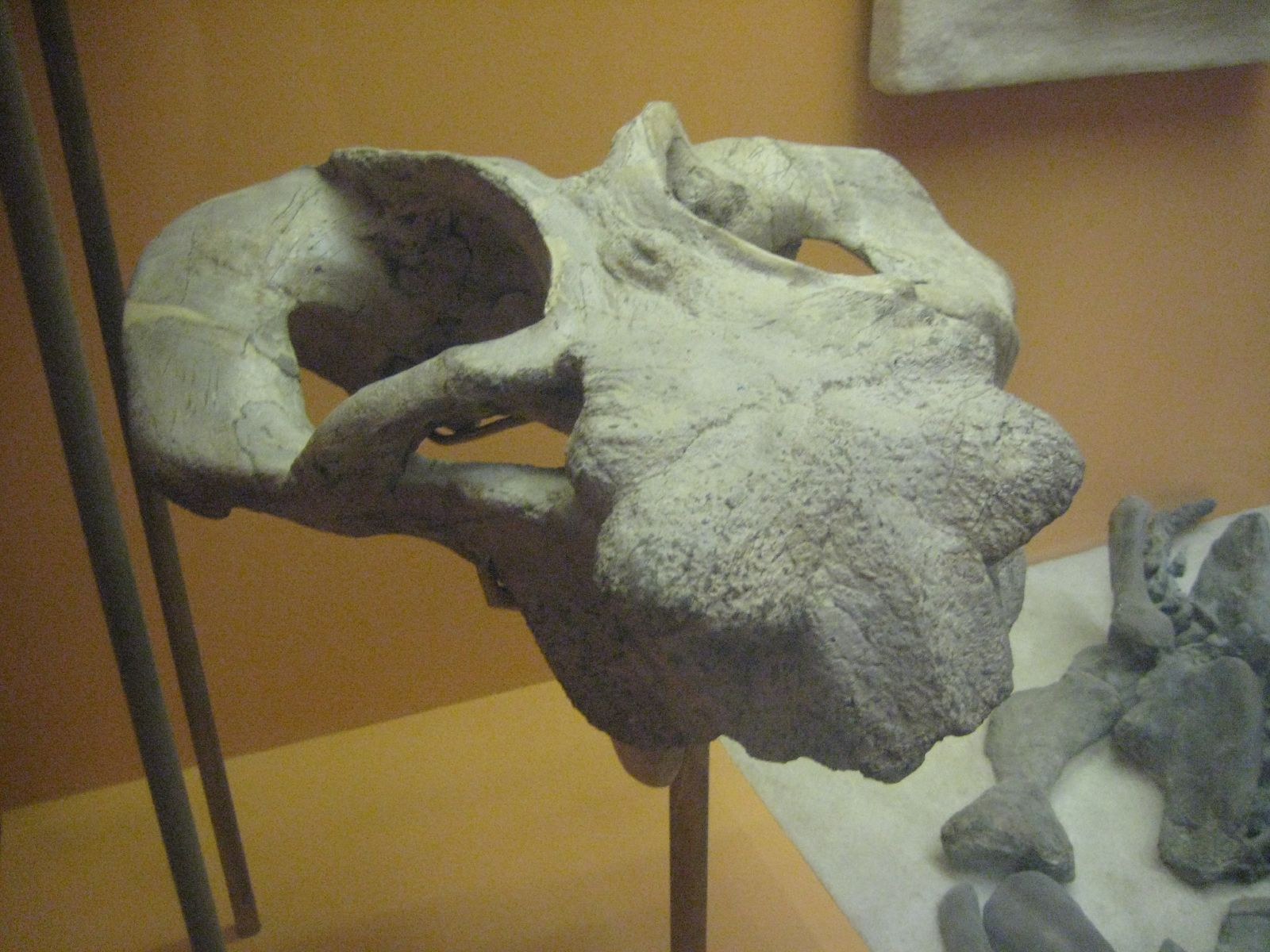
Skull of Aulacephalodon bainii

Tollman et al. (1980) suggests that the nasal bosses in the skulls of collected Aulacephalodon specimens provide the most compelling evidence of sexual dimorphism in Aulacephalodon fossils. Morphological studies found that the sizes of the nasal bosses of collected specimens can be categorized into three different size ranges, with specimens possessing the largest sized nasal bosses assumed to be mature males. Female Aulacephalodon were found to be specimens with weakly developed nasal bosses. Specimens that were thought to represent mature males also had larger craniums with a thicker squamosal at the border of the zygomatic arch. Female specimens showed no thickening in the zygomatic arch. The canine tusks also appear to be longer and further apart in male specimens. Tollman et al. suggests sexual dimorphism existed in Aulacephalodon as a means of sexual selection and as a display mechanism. Important limitations to this analysis are that no specimen showed entirely male or female characters and many of the specimens used were characterized as immature juveniles. Possible explanations for this observation are that non-dimorphic characters present in the crania effectively mask the sexual dimorphism characters, or sexual dimorphic characters were not present in the fossils due to a lack of measurable characters.

== Paleoecology ==
Aulacephalodon specimens have been found in Cistecephalus zone sediments of South Africa. The terrain of the Cistecephalus zone is thought to be a lowland composed of vast floodplains, with many traversing streams that crossed the landscape. The climate of the Beaufort Group during the Late Permian was semi-arid, with seasonal rainfall. While the overall climate of the Cistecephalus zone was not suitable for diverse environments, this zone was the height of genetic diversity of dicynodonts. Aulacephalodon occupied over 86% of the rich localities of the Cistecephalus zone, suggesting the habitat during this time was extremely suitable for Aulacephalodon. Recent biostratigraphy of the Beaufort Group has marked the lower boundary of the Cistecephalus assemblage zone by the first appearance of Aulacephalodon and the first appearance of Cistecephalus. This more specific boundary is the result of a refined biozonation map and new technology that allows for more accurate geographic information data (GIS).

=== Extinction ===
Aulacephalodon went would go extinct during the turnover event that separated the lower and upper subzones of the Daptocephalus Assemblage Zone. This turnover event was the result of aridification which saw the decline of which saw the decline of lacustrine floodplains, which were replaced by well-drained floodplains. Following its extinction, Aulacephalodon would have been replaced by large herbivores such as Lystrosaurus maccaigi.

== See also ==
- Dicynodonts
- Anomodonts
- List of therapsids
- Rhachiocephalus
- Pelanomodon
- Oudenodon
