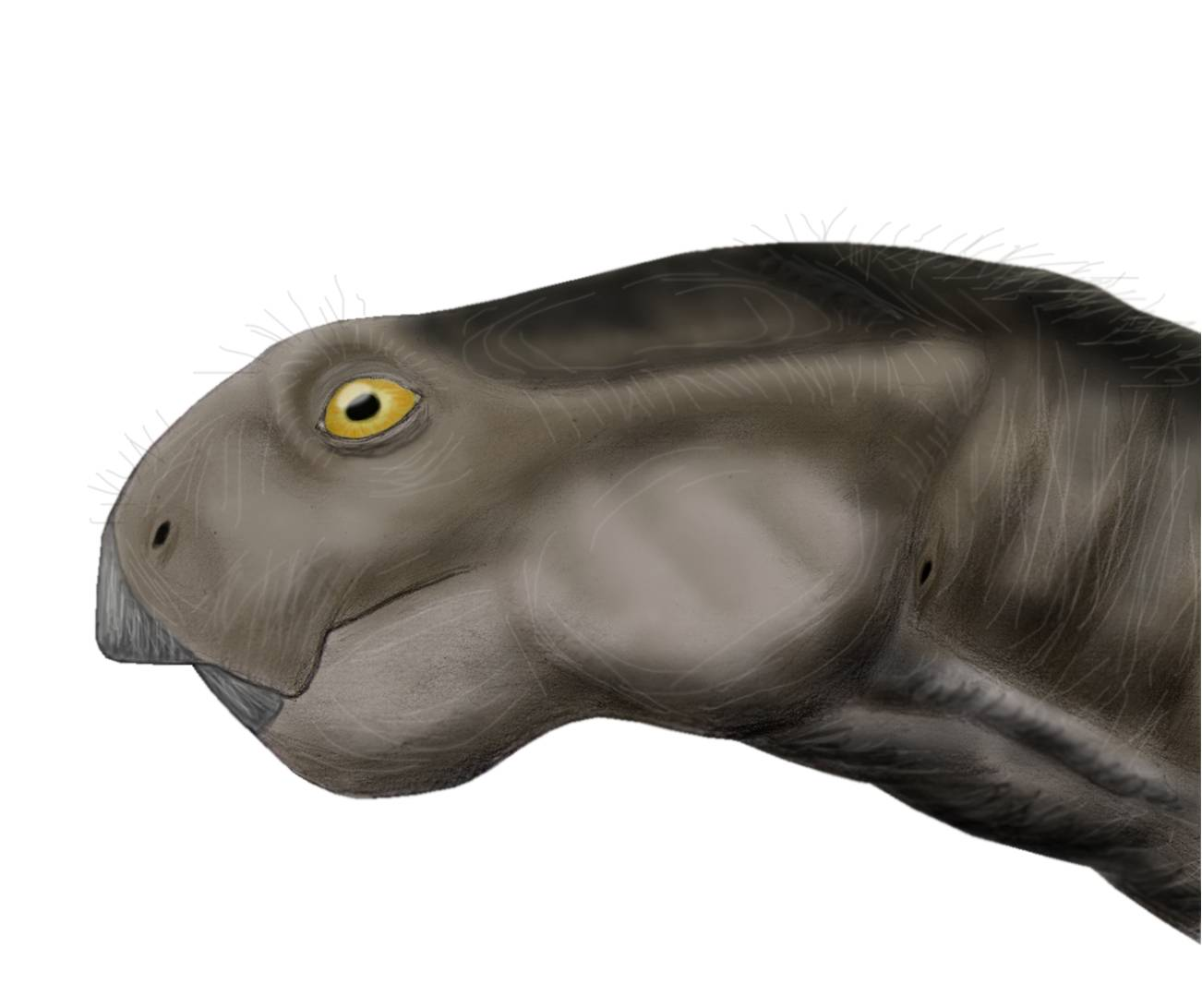
- Oudenodon

Scientific classification
- Kingdom: Animalia
- Phylum: Chordata
- Clade: Synapsida
- Clade: Therapsida
- Clade: †Anomodontia
- Clade: †Dicynodontia
- Clade: †Cryptodontia
- Family: †Oudenodontidae; Cope, 1871

Genera
- Australobarbarus; Oudenodon; Tropidostoma

= Oudenodontidae =

Oudenodontidae Temporal range: Late Permian

Family of extinct dicynodont therapsids

Oudenodontidae is an extinct family of dicynodont therapsids, known from the Late Permian of Malawi, Namibia, Russia, South Africa, Tanzania, and Zambia. It includes three genera, Australobarbarus, Oudenodon, and Tropidostoma.
