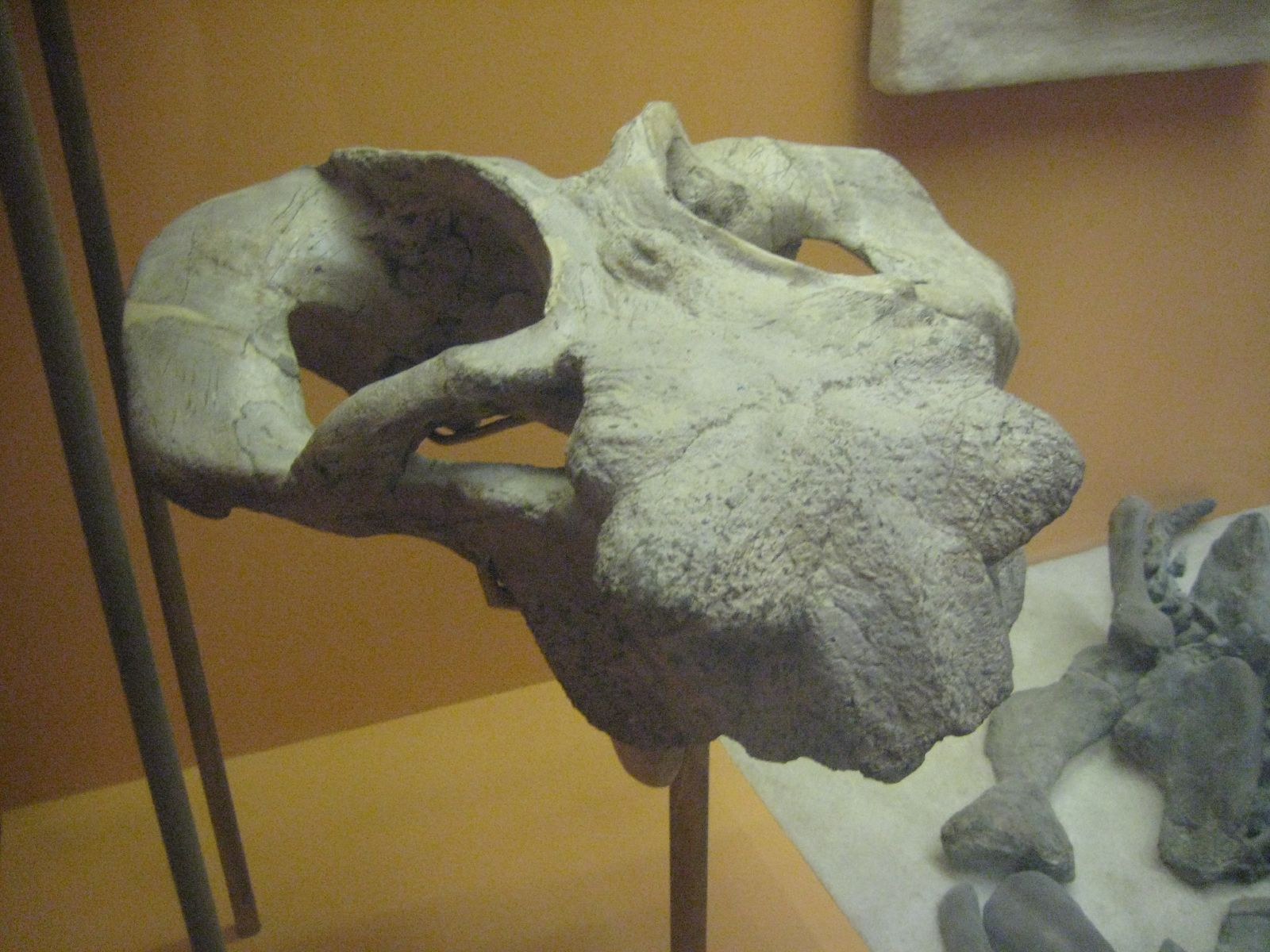
- Skull of Aulacephalodon bainii

Scientific classification
- Kingdom: Animalia
- Phylum: Chordata
- Clade: Synapsida
- Clade: Therapsida
- Clade: †Anomodontia
- Clade: †Dicynodontia
- Clade: †Cryptodontia
- Family: †Geikiidae; Nopcsa, 1923

Genera
- †Bulbasaurus; ?†Idelesaurus; ?†Odontocyclops; †Geikiinae; †Aulacephalodon; †Geikia; †Pelanomodon

= Geikiidae =

Geikiidae Temporal range: Late Permian

Extinct family of dicynodonts

Geikiidae is a family of Late Permian dicynodonts. Fossils are known from Scotland, South Africa, and Tanzania. The family was first named by Franz Nopcsa in 1923, although Friedrich von Huene's 1948 description of the family brought it into common usage. Von Huene established Geikiidae as a monotypic family for Geikia, then known from Scotland. He distinguished Geikia from all other dicynodonts because it lacked a preparietal bone. The outlines on the bones of the skull roof could not be seen however, meaning that this characteristic was uncertain in geikiids. Geikiids were originally classified as close relatives of Dicynodon and Lystrosaurus, but the characters that linked these dicynodonts are also seen in many other forms. It is more likely that features seen in Dicynodon and Lystrosaurus, such as widely separated eye sockets, evolved in parallel in geikiids.
