= Elph (therapsid) =

Elph Temporal range: Late Permian, Wordian–Changhsingian

Scientific classification
- Kingdom: Animalia
- Phylum: Chordata
- Clade: Synapsida
- Clade: Therapsida
- Clade: †Anomodontia
- Clade: †Dicynodontia
- Family: †Elphidae
- Subfamily: †Elphinae
- Genus: †Elph; Kurkin, 1999
- Species: †E. borealis

Binomial name
- †Elph borealis Kurkin, 1999

Extinct genus of dicynodonts

Elph (an arbitrary combination of letters) is an extinct genus of dicynodont therapsids from Russia. Four specimens have been found from the Sokolki Assemblage in European Russia, representing a fauna that dates back to the Late Permian. The holotype, PIN 2353/37, was originally considered a juvenile specimen due to its small size (with a total skull length of 10.6 cm (4.2 in)), before being recognized as a mature individual.

Elph was a small herbivore that lived alongside carnivorous akidnognathids and inostranceviids, as well as larger herbivores like Dicynodon and pareiasaurids. The type species E. borealis was named in 1999. Elph has a short snout and tusks, and it is closely related to Interpresosaurus and Katumbia within the family Elphidae. Kurkin (2012) proposed that features like short preorbital region of skull and tusk aligned with the anterior part of orbit could suggest close ecological and phylogenetic affinities between Elph and Dicynodon amalitzkii, although no computational analysis was done.
