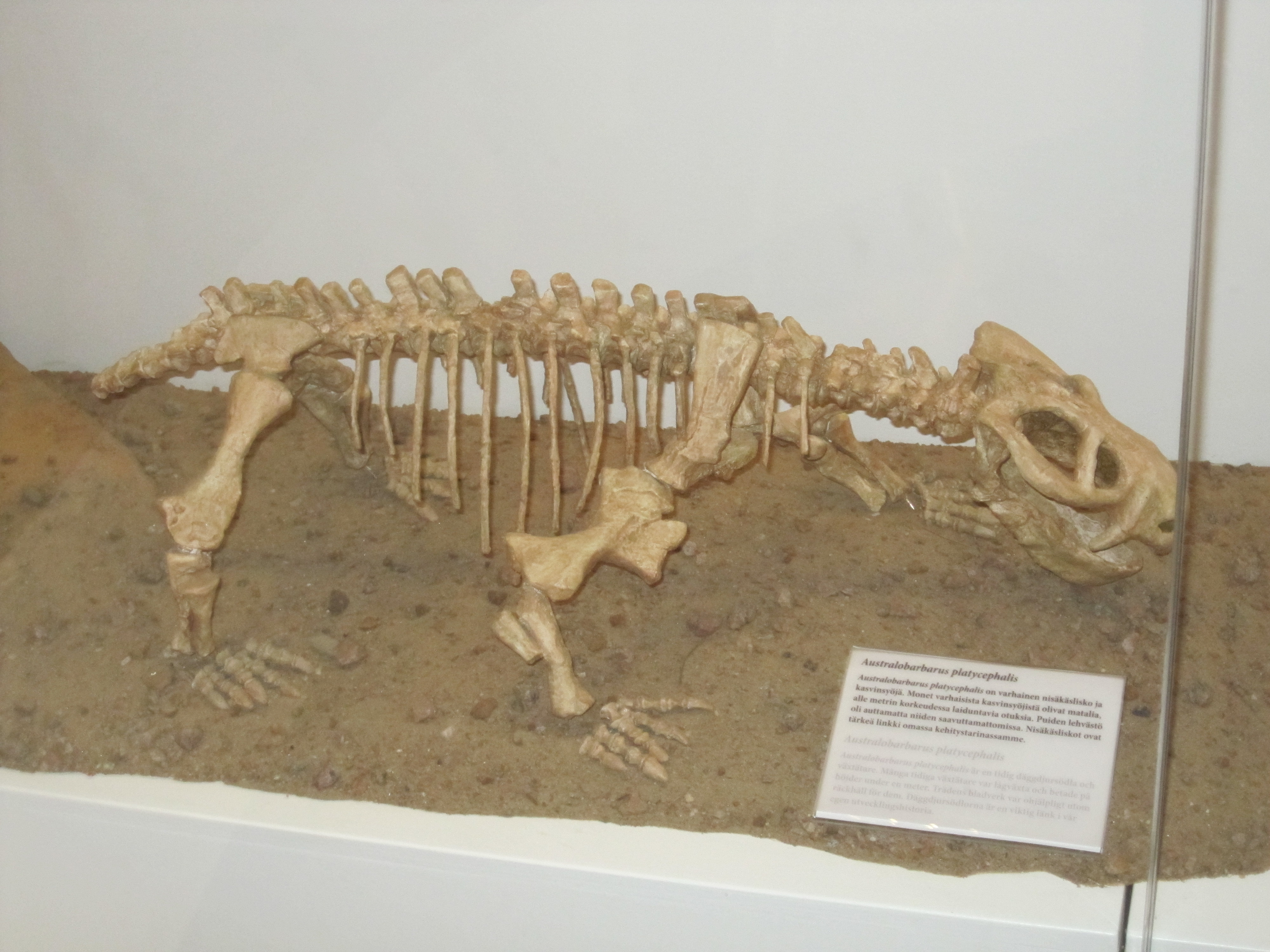
- Skeleton in Natural History Museum of Helsinki, Finland

Scientific classification
- Domain: Eukaryota
- Kingdom: Animalia
- Phylum: Chordata
- Clade: Synapsida
- Clade: Therapsida
- Suborder: †Anomodontia
- Clade: †Dicynodontia
- Family: †Oudenodontidae
- Genus: †Australobarbarus; Kurkin, 2000

Species
- †A. platycephalus; †A. kotelnitschi

= Australobarbarus =

Australobarbarus Temporal range: Late Permian

Extinct genus of dicynodonts

Australobarbarus is a genus of dicynodont from Late Permian (Wuchiapingian) of Russia.

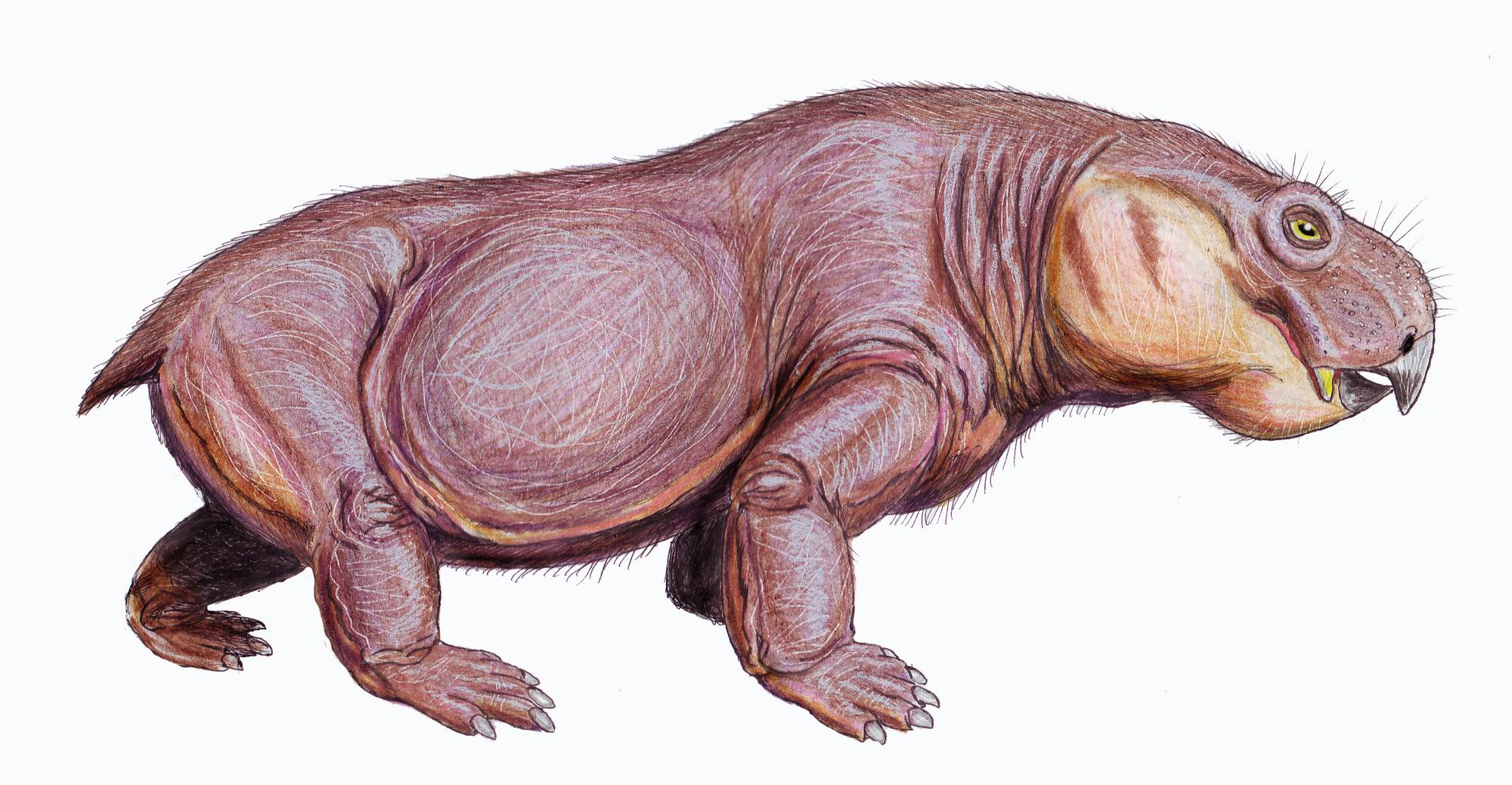
Restoration of Australobarbarus platycephalus
