= Idelesaurus =

Idelesaurus Temporal range: Late Permian ~265–254 Ma

Scientific classification
- Domain: Eukaryota
- Kingdom: Animalia
- Phylum: Chordata
- Clade: Synapsida
- Clade: Therapsida
- Suborder: †Anomodontia
- Clade: †Dicynodontia
- Clade: †Cryptodontia
- Genus: †Idelesaurus; Kurkin 2006

Type species
- †I. tataricus Kurkin 2006

Extinct genus of dicynodonts

Idelesaurus is a genus of dicynodont from the Late Permian (Wuchiapingian) Ilinskoe Subassemblage of the Sokolki Assemblage Zone of Russia.
