= Interpresosaurus =

Interpresosaurus Temporal range: Late Permian

Scientific classification
- Domain: Eukaryota
- Kingdom: Animalia
- Phylum: Chordata
- Clade: Synapsida
- Clade: Therapsida
- Suborder: †Anomodontia
- Clade: †Dicynodontia
- Family: †Elphidae
- Subfamily: †Elphinae
- Genus: †Interpresosaurus; Kurkin, 2001
- Species: †I. blomi

Binomial name
- †Interpresosaurus blomi Kurkin, 2001

Extinct genus of dicynodonts

Interpresosaurus ("mediator lizard") is a genus of dicynodont from the Late Permian (Changhsingian) Vyazniki Assemblage of Russia. The type and only species, Interpresosaurus blomi, is known from a single fragmentary skull, PIN 3584/1.
