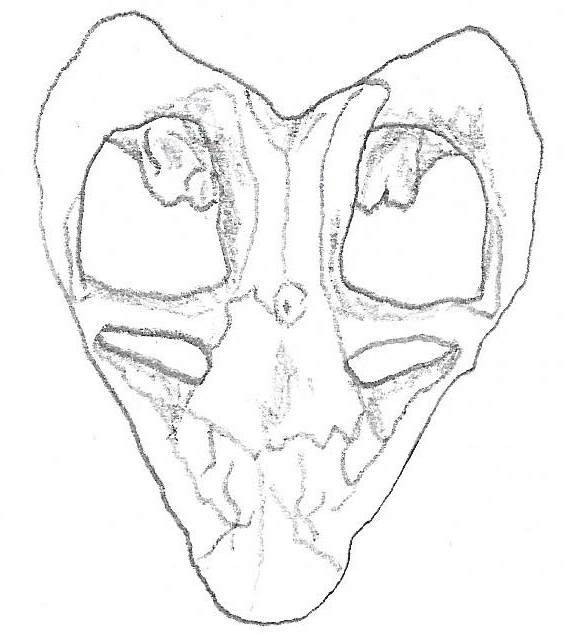

Scientific classification
- Domain: Eukaryota
- Kingdom: Animalia
- Phylum: Chordata
- Clade: Synapsida
- Clade: Therapsida
- Suborder: †Anomodontia
- Clade: †Dicynodontia
- Family: †Rhachiocephalidae
- Genus: †Rhachiocephalus; Seeley, 1898

= Rhachiocephalus =

Rhachiocephalus Temporal range: Late Permian

Extinct genus of dicynodonts

Rhachiocephalus is an extinct genus of dicynodont therapsid.
