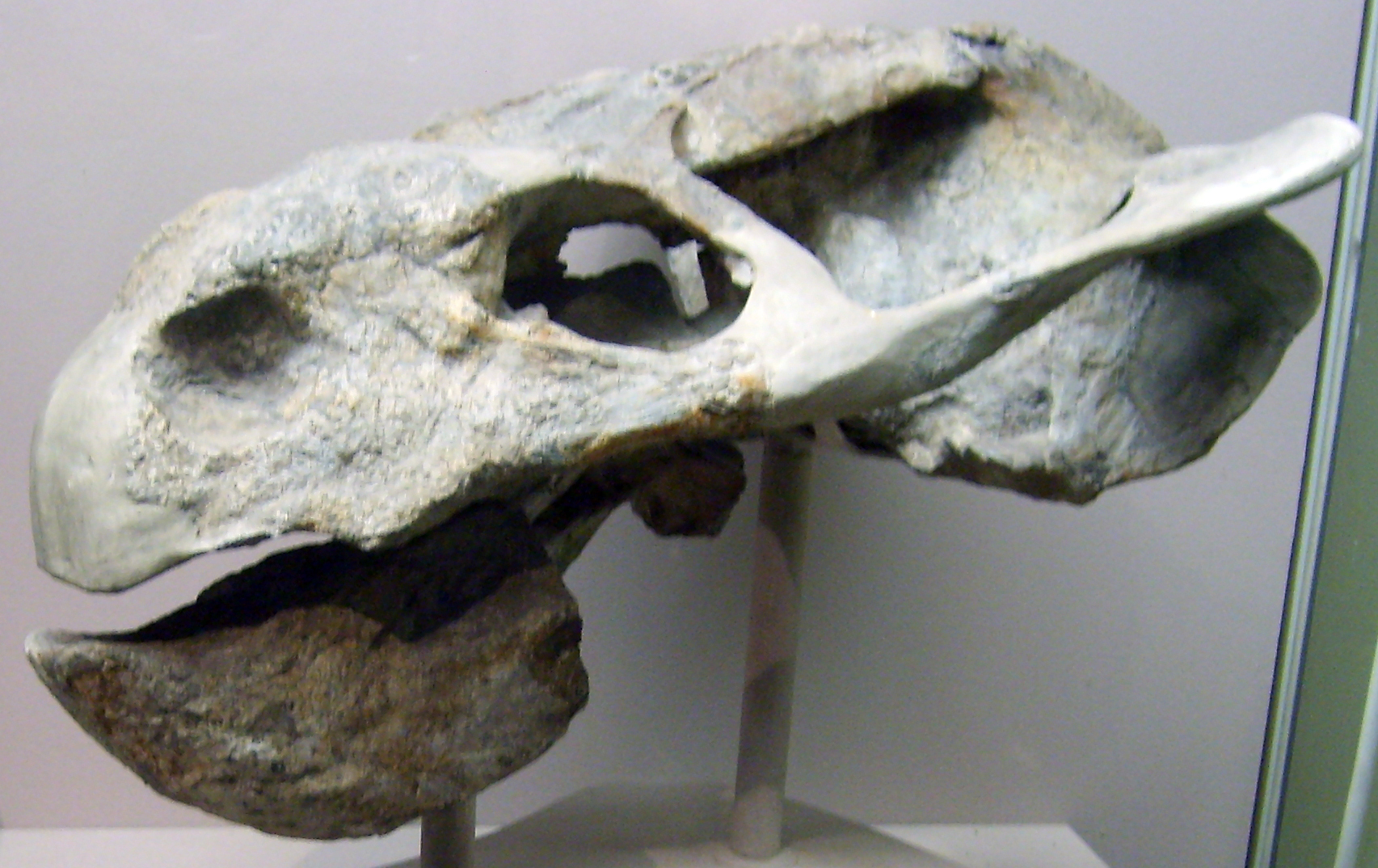
- O. baini skull at the Museum für Naturkunde, Berlin

Scientific classification
- Kingdom: Animalia
- Phylum: Chordata
- Clade: Synapsida
- Clade: Therapsida
- Clade: †Anomodontia
- Clade: †Dicynodontia
- Family: †Oudenodontidae
- Genus: †Oudenodon; Owen, 1860

Species
- O. bainii Owen, 1860 (type); O. grandis Haughton, 1917; O. sakamenensis Mazin and King, 1991

Synonyms
- Genus synonymy: Chelyrhynchus Haughton, 1917; Species synonymy: Aulacocephalodon milletti (Broom, 1928)(originally Dicynodon milletti); Chelyrhynchus lachrymalis Haughton, 1917; Dicynodon allani Broom, 1940; Dicynodon andrewsi Broom, 1921; Dicynodon brachyrhynchus Broom, 1948; Dicynodon breviceps Haughton, 1915; Dicynodon corstorphinei Broom & Haughton, 1917; Dicynodon curtus Broom, 1921; Dicynodon cyclops Haughton, 1917; Dicynodon euryceps Boonstra, 1938; Dicynodon graaffi Broom, 1940; Dicynodon greyii Owen, 1860; Dicynodon helenae Boonstra, 1938; Dicynodon kolbei Broom, 1912; Dicynodon lutriceps Broom, 1912; Dicynodon maccabei Broom, 1940; Dicynodon marlothi Broili & Schröder, 1917; Dicynodon megalops Owen, 1876; Dicynodon moutonae Broom, 1948; Dicynodon nesemanni Broom, 1940; Dicynodon parabreviceps Boonstra, 1938; Dicynodon prognathus Owen, 1860; Dicynodon richardi Broom, 1940; Dicynodon robertsi Broom, 1948; Dicynodon schwarzi Broom, 1919; Dicynodon truncatus Broom, 1899; Dicynodon vanderbyli Broom, 1928; Dicynodon wellwoodensis Broom, 1936; Oudenodon bolorhinus Broom, 1911; Oudenodon brevirostris (Owen, 1876)(originally Dicynodon brevirostris); Oudenodon glaucops (Broom, 1948)(originally Oudenodon); Oudenodon halli (Watson, 1914)(originally Dicyonodon halli); Oudenodon latirostris Broom, 1932; O. luangwensis Boonstra, 1938; Oudenodon mustoi Haughton, 1915; Oudenodon planus (Broom, 1913)(originally Dicynodon planus); Oudenodon platyceps (Broom, 1913)(originally Dicynodon platyceps)<; Oudenodon platyfrons (Broom, 1932)(originally Dicynodon platyfrons); Oudenodon robustus (Broom, 1932)(originally Dicynodon robustus); Oudenodon wilmanae (Broom, 1928)(originally Dicynodon wilmanae)

= Oudenodon =

Oudenodon Temporal range: Late Permian

Extinct genus of dicynodonts

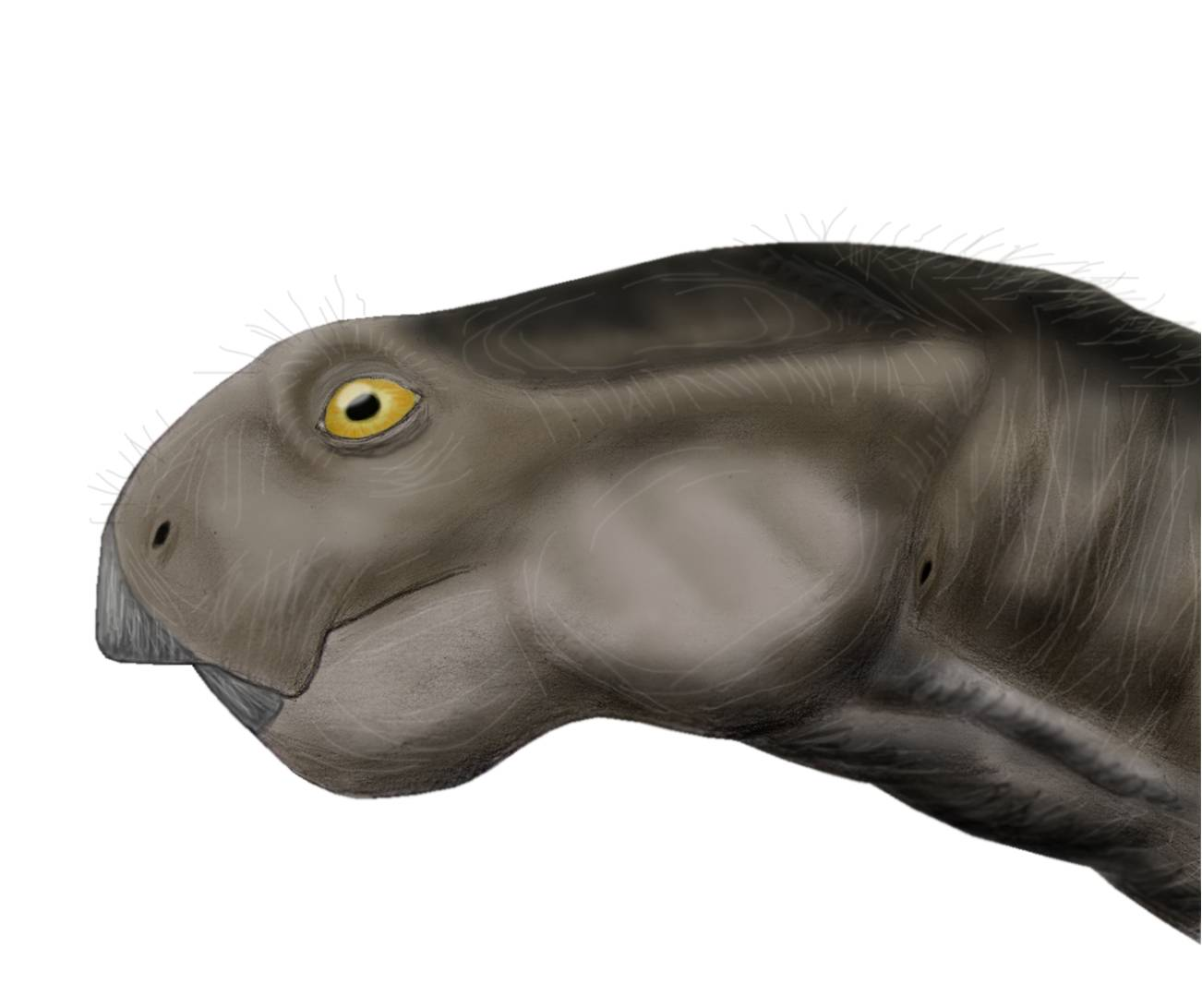
Restoration of Oudenodon bainii

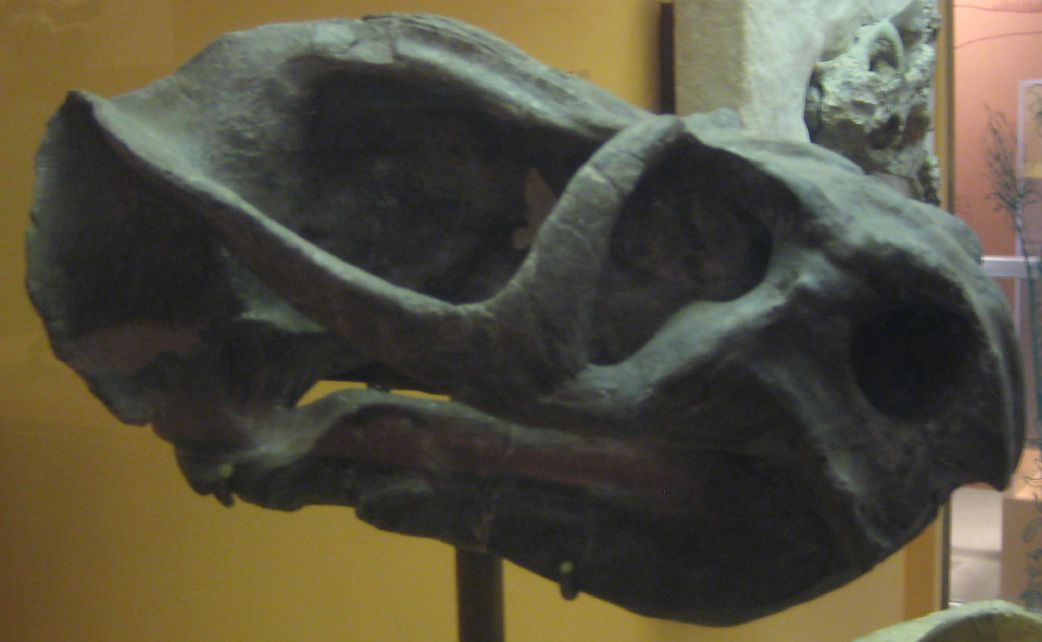
Oudenodon latirostris skull

Oudenodon is an extinct genus of dicynodont. It was common throughout southern Africa during the Late Permian. Several species of Oudenodon are known. Both O. bainii, the type species, and O. grandis are known from South Africa (Cistecephalus Assemblage Zone and Endothiodon Assemblage Zone). Specimens of O. luangwensis have been found from Zambia. One species, O. sakamenensis from the Lower Sakamena Formation is the only Permian therapsid yet described from Madagascar. It is the type genus of the family Oudenodontidae, which includes members such as Tropidostoma.

== Palaeobiology ==
=== Metabolism ===
Oudenodon is concluded on the basis of its δ^{18}O_{p} values to have been an ectothermic animal.

== See also ==
- List of therapsids
