= Colobodectes =

Colobodectes Temporal range: Middle Permian

Scientific classification
- Domain: Eukaryota
- Kingdom: Animalia
- Phylum: Chordata
- Clade: Synapsida
- Clade: Therapsida
- Suborder: †Anomodontia
- Clade: †Dicynodontia
- Genus: †Colobodectes; Modesto et al., 2003

Type species
- †C. cluveri Modesto et al., 2003

Extinct genus of dicynodonts

Colobodectes is an extinct genus of dicynodont therapsid from the Tapinocephalus Assemblage Zone in the Abrahamskraal Formation (Beaufort Group), South Africa.

== See also ==
- List of therapsids
