= Christian Sidor =

American paleontologist

Christian Alfred Sidor is an American vertebrate paleontologist. He is currently a Professor in the Department of Biology, University of Washington in Seattle, as well as Curator of Vertebrate Paleontology and Associate Director for Research and Collections at the Burke Museum of Natural History and Culture. His research focuses on Permian and Triassic tetrapod evolution, especially on therapsids. He received his Ph.D. from the University of Chicago in 2000 and won the Romer Prize in 2001 for his doctoral work.

== Academic and professional background ==
Sidor received a B.S. (with honors) in biology from Trinity College in 1994. He went on to pursue his graduate studies at the University of Chicago, completing his M.S. in 1996 and his Ph.D. in 2000 under the supervision of James Hopson. Sidor won the Romer Prize in 2001 for his doctoral work, a competitive annual award at the Society of Vertebrate Paleontology annual meeting for the best predoctoral student oral presentation. Following his dissertation, Sidor held a postdoctoral fellowship at the National Museum of Natural History (2001) before becoming an Assistant Professor in Anatomy at the New York College of Osteopathic Medicine. He held that position until 2005, when he took up a position as an Assistant Professor in Biology at the University of Washington. Presently, he is a full Professor in Biology at the University of Washington, as well as a Curator of Vertebrate Paleontology and Associate Director for Research and Collections at the affiliated Burke Museum. He is a research associate at the Field Museum of Natural History, National Museum of Natural History, and Evolutionary Studies Institute (University of the Witwatersrand).

== Academic contributions ==
Sidor is best known for his work on therapsid synapsids; the title of his dissertation was "Evolutionary trends and relationships within the Synapsida." However, Sidor has been involved with research on a diverse array of other Paleozoic and Mesozoic tetrapod clades, including temnospondyl amphibians; captorhinid reptiles; pseudosuchian archosaurs; and avemetatarsalian archosaurs, encompassing a wide-ranging research program focusing on descriptive anatomy, taxonomy and phylogenetics, histology and pathology, trends in biogeography, and responses of tetrapods to major climatic perturbations. Sidor has extensive experience collecting and researching fossils from historically less well-sampled geographic regions, including Niger, Tanzania, Zambia, and Antarctica. Previously he was a member of the editorial board of the Journal of Vertebrate Paleontology (2005-2010).

Below is a list of new taxa that Sidor has contributed to naming:

Year	Taxon	Authors
2026	Sonselasuchus cedrus gen. et sp. nov.	Smith & Sidor
2025	Dicynodontoides kubwa sp. nov.	Shipps, Sidor, & Angielczyk
2025	Arctops umulunshi sp. nov.	Mann & Sidor
2023	Rhigerpeton isbelli gen. et sp. nov.	Gee, Beightol & Sidor
2023	Bondoceras bulborhynchus gen. et sp. nov.	Sidor
2023	Pembecephalus litumbaensis gen. et sp. nov.	Sidor
2022	Notictoides absens gen. et sp. nov.	Sidor, Kulik & Huttenlocker
2021	Mobaceras zambeziense gen. et sp. nov.	Kammerer & Sidor
2021	Isengops luangwensis, gen. et sp. nov.	Sidor, Tabor & Smith
2020	Nshimbodon muchingaensis gen. et sp. nov.	Huttenlocker & Sidor
2020	Kataigidodon venetus gen. et sp. nov.	Kligman, Marsh, Sues & Sidor
2019	Ancistronychus paradoxus gen. et sp. nov.	Gonçalves & Sidor
2019	Laosuchus naga gen. et sp. nov.	Arbez, Sidor & Steyer
2019	Antarctanax shackletoni gen. et sp. nov.	Peecook, Smith & Sidor
2017	Teleocrater rhadinus gen. et sp. nov.	Nesbitt, Butler, Ezcurra, Barrett, Stocker, Angielczyk, Smith, Sidor, Niedźwiedzki, Sennikov, & Charig
2016	Wantulignathus gwembensis gen. et sp. nov	Whitney & Sidor
2016	Mupashi migrator gen. et sp. nov.	Huttenlocker & Sidor
2015	Opisthodontosaurus carrolli gen. et sp. nov.	Reisz, LeBlanc, Sidor, Scott & May
2015	Ichibengops munyamadziensis gen. et sp. nov.	Huttenlocker & Sidor
2014	Abajudon kaayai gen. et sp. nov.	Angielczyk, Huertas, Smith, Tabor, Sidor, Steyer, Tsuji, & Gostling
2014	Nundasuchus songeaensis gen. et sp. nov.	Nesbitt, Sidor, Angielczyk, Smith & Tsuji
2014	Antarctosuchus polyodon gen. et sp. nov.	Sidor, Steyer & Hammer
2013	Lutungutali sitwensis gen. et sp. nov.	Peecook, Sidor, Nesbitt, Smith, Steyer & Angielczyk
2013	Nyasasaurus parringtoni gen. et sp. nov.	Nesbitt, Barrett, Werning, Sidor & Charig
2010	Asilisaurus kongwe gen. et sp. nov.	Nesbitt, Sidor, Irmis, Angielczyk, Smith, & Tsuji
2010	Kombuisia antarctica sp. nov.	Fröbisch, Angielczyk & Sidor
2008	Kryostega collinsoni gen. et sp. nov.	Sidor, Damiani, & Hammer
2007	Lophorhinus willodenensis gen. et sp. nov.	Sidor & Smith
2006	Pachydectes elsi gen. et sp. nov.	Rubidge, Modesto & Sidor
2006	Paraburnetia sneeubergensis gen. et sp. nov.	Smith, Rubidge & Sidor
2006	Elliotherium kersteni gen. et sp. nov.	Sidor & Hancox
2006	Herpetoskylax hopsoni gen. et sp. nov.	Sidor & Rubidge
2005	Saharastega moradiensis gen. et sp. nov	Sidor, O'Keefe, Damiani, Steyer, Smith, Larsson, Sereno, Ide, & Maga
2005	Nigerpeton ricqlesi gen. et sp. nov.	Sidor, O'Keefe, Damiani, Steyer, Smith, Larsson, Sereno, Ide, & Maga
2004	Lobalopex mordax gen. et sp. nov.	Sidor, Hopson & Keyser
2004	Progalesaurus lootsbergensis gen. et sp. nov.	Sidor & Smith
2003	Anatosuchus minor gen. et sp. nov.	Sereno, Sidor, Larsson & Gado
1998	Suchomimus tenerensis gen. et sp. nov.	Sereno et al.
1996	Deltadromeus agilis gen. et sp. nov.	Sereno, Dutheil, Iarochene, Larsson, Lyon, Magwene, Sidor, Varrichio, & Wilson
