= Fremouw Peak =

Mountain in Ross Dependency, Antarctica

Fremouw Peak (84°17′S 164°20′E) is a prominent peak, 2,550 metres (8,370 ft) high, forming the south side of the mouth of Prebble Glacier, in the Queen Alexandra Range, Antarctica. It was named by the Advisory Committee on Antarctic Names for Edward J. Fremouw, a United States Antarctic Research Program aurora scientist at South Pole Station, 1959.

The Triassic Fremouw Formation is named for a 614-metre (2,014 ft) thick interval of sedimentary rocks exposed on the slopes of Fremouw Peak. This peak serves as the type locality for the Fremouw Formation. Fragmentary vertebrate fossils have been found in these sedimentary rocks. Of more significance is an outcrop of Triassic peat, permineralized (silicified) into chert, that occurs on Fremouw Peak. This unique chert deposit contains anatomically preserved plant fossils. These fossils can be used to reconstructing complex three-dimensional plant structures and understand reproductive biology and development.

== See also ==
- Thrinaxodon Col
- Gordon Valley
