= Fremouw Formation =

Geological formation in Antarctica

- Stratigraphic range: latest Permian-early Late Triassic 252–235 Ma
- Type: Geological formation
- Unit of: Beacon Supergroup
- Sub-units: Lower, middle, upper
- Underlies: Falla Formation
- Overlies: Buckley Formation
- Thickness: up to 1,000 m (3,300 ft)

Lithology
- Primary: Sandstone, siltstone, mudstone

Location
- Coordinates: 84.0000°S 165.0000°E
- Approximate paleocoordinates: 81.8°S 69.8°E
- Region: Transantarctic Mountains of Antarctica
- Country: Ross Dependency

Type section
- Named for: Fremouw Peak, Queen Alexandra Range, Antarctica.
- Named by: P. J. Barrett
- Fremouw Formation (Antarctica)

The Fremouw Formation is a Triassic-age rock formation in the Transantarctic Mountains of the Ross Dependency of Antarctica. It contains the oldest known fossils of tetrapods from Antarctica, including synapsids, reptiles and amphibians. Fossilized trees have also been found. The formation's beds were deposited along the banks of rivers and on floodplains. During the Triassic, the area would have been a riparian forest at 70–75°S latitude.

== Stratigraphy ==
The Fremouw Formation is mostly Triassic in age, with the oldest rocks dating back to the latest Permian. Much of the formation is quartzose sandstone that was deposited in stream beds. It overlies the Permian Buckley Formation, which consists of coal and Glossopteris fossils. The formation is informally divided into lower, middle, and upper units. Most fossils are found in the Lower Fremouw Formation. Here, bones are preserved in fine-grained siltstones and mudstones, coarse-grained channel sandstones, and conglomerates.

== Paleoenvironment ==
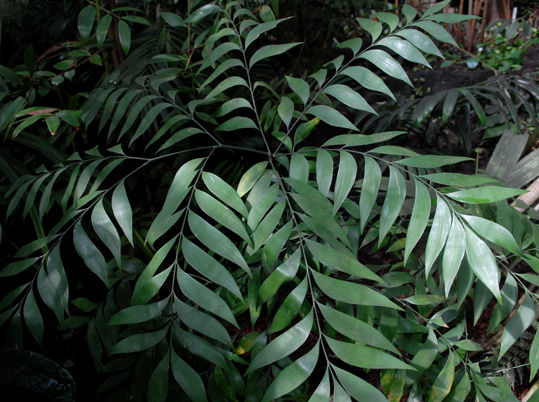
Cycads from the Fremouw Formation are similar to the living Bowenia from Australia

Well-preserved plants are common in the Fremouw Formation. Logs have been found in channel deposits, and roots and stems have been found in permineralized soil. Smaller fossils on Fremouw Peak include cycads, horsetails, seed ferns, Osmundaceae ferns, and even fungi. One cycad called Antarcticycas is similar in appearance to the living Bowenia of Australia. In 2003, 99 fossilized tree trunks were described from Gordon Valley. These trunks comprise an intact fossilized forest, allowing for an estimation of the distribution of plants and tree cover. Dicroidium fossils are present around the conifer-like stumps, suggesting that they were the leaves of these large trees. Based on the geology of the area, the trees grew alongside riverbanks and on floodplains. The structure of the plants shows no adaptation towards cold tolerance, suggesting that the climate was much warmer in the Triassic.

The Fremouw Formation preserves many tetrapod fossils that span the Permo-Triassic boundary, which marks the Permo-Triassic mass extinction. Around the world, the fossil record of many tetrapod groups is absent or very limited in Early Triassic rocks, implying a major decline in diversity after the extinction. The presence of many of these groups in Middle Triassic strata indicates that long ghost lineages must have extended back into the Early Triassic. Tetrapods such as temnospondyl amphibians, diapsid reptiles, and dicynodont therapsids were common in the Late Permian and seemed to have recovered by the Middle Triassic, but there is little record of their presence in the Early Triassic. All of these tetrapods are present in Early Triassic strata of the Fremouw Formation, suggesting that Antarctica served as a refugium for these animals. During the extinction, global temperatures rose and the supercontinent Pangea moved northward, putting pressure on populations that could not adapt to the warming climate. Antarctica, while much warmer in the Early Triassic than it is today, was cooler than other parts of Gondwana and may have been more hospitable to tetrapod populations. Antarctica's milder climate allowed many groups to take refuge in the region while other populations experienced decline. In the Early Triassic, many Fremouw Formation tetrapods had smaller body sizes than their Permian ancestors, and many were adapted for burrowing. Both of these characteristics are seen as adaptations to Antarctica's greater seasonal variability and protracted day-night cycles.

== Biota ==
The first tetrapod, or land-living vertebrate, from Antarctica was found in the Fremouw Formation and described in 1968. It was represented by a small bone fragment that is probably part of the left mandible of a temnospondyl amphibian. The bone was found the previous year by a researcher from Ohio State University who was studying the geology of the Transantarctic Mountains. The animal was later named Austrobrachyops Jenseni. After its discovery, paleontological expeditions were launched to the area around the Beardmore Glacier to uncover more fossils. Since then, fragmentary remains of temnospondyls, therapsids, and archosauriform reptiles have all been found in the formation. These fossils are found around the Shackleton and Beardmore glaciers, in places such as Gordon Valley and Fremouw Peak.

=== Tetrapods ===
Color key: Taxon / Reclassified taxon / Taxon falsely reported as present / Dubious taxon or junior synonym / Ichnotaxon / Ootaxon / Morphotaxon

Notes
Uncertain or tentative taxa are in small text
~~crossed out~~ taxa are discredited.

==== Temnospondyls ====
Taxon	Species	Member	Material	Notes	Images
Austrobrachyops	A. jenseni	Lower Fremouw	Jaw fragment, pterygoid bone, and other small fragments	A nomen dubium based on a combination of material from brachyopid temnospondyls, a dicynodont, and other animals	
Antarctosuchus	A. polyodon	Upper Fremouw	A mostly complete skull	A capitosaur temnospondyl	
Cryobatrachus	C. kitchingi	Lower Fremouw	A partial skull and other bone fragments	A lydekkerinid temnospondyl	
Kryostega	K. collinsoni	Upper Fremouw	Large snout fragment	A stereospondyl temnospondyl	
Micropholis	M. stowi	Lower Fremouw	A block containing the skeletons of 4 individuals of the taxon, accounting for much of the skeletons.	A Euskelian temnopodyl	
Parotosuchus	P. sp.	Upper Fremouw	Fragment of the right side of the snout.	A temnospondyl	
Rhigerpeton	R. isbelli	Lower Fremouw	Partial skull	A lapillopsid temnospondyl	
Rhytidosteidae	R. indet.	Lower Fremouw		A temnospondyl	

==== Reptiles ====
Taxon	Species	Member	Material	Notes	Images
Antarctanax	A. shackletoni	Lower Fremouw	Eight presacral vertebrae, left humerus, ribs, feet	Medium-sized archosauriform	
Archosauriformes	Indeterminate.	Lower Fremouw	Partial presacral vertebra and left humerus	A large-bodied archosauriform reptile	
Palacrodon	P. browni	Lower Fremouw		An enigmatic diapsid reptile; initially named Fremouwsaurus geludens	
Procolophon	P. trigoniceps	Lower Fremouw		A procolophonid reptile	
Prolacerta	P. broomi	Lower Fremouw		A prolacertiform reptile	

==== Synapsids ====
===== Cynodonts =====
Taxon	Species	Member	Material	Notes	Images
Cynognathus	Cynognathus sp.	Upper Fremouw		A cynodont	
Impidens	I. hancoxi	Upper Fremouw	Partial snout	A cynodont, originally described as Diademodontidae indet.	
Thrinaxodon	T. liorhinus	Lower Fremouw		A cynodont	

===== Dicynodonts =====
Taxon	Species	Member	Material	Notes	Images
Kannemeyeriidae	Indeterminate.	Upper Fremouw		A dicynodont	
Kombuisia	K. antarctica	Lower Fremouw		A dicynodont	
Lystrosaurus	L. curvatus	Lower Fremouw		A dicynodont	
Lystrosaurus	L. murrayi	Lower Fremouw		A dicynodont	
Myosaurus	M. gracilis	Lower Fremouw		A dicynodont	

===== Therocephalians =====
Taxon	Species	Member	Material	Notes	Images
Ericiolacerta	E. parva	Lower Fremouw		A therocephalian	
Notictoides	N. absens			A therocephalian	
Pedaeosaurus	P. parvus	Lower Fremouw		A therocephalian	
Rhigosaurus	R. glacialis	Lower Fremouw		A therocephalian	

=== See also ===
- List of fossiliferous stratigraphic units in Antarctica
