= Thrinaxodon Col =

Mountain pass in Antarctica

- Location within Antarctica

Location
- Range: Cumulus Hills, Queen Maud Mountains
- Coordinates: 85°12′S 174°19′W

Thrinaxodon Col (85°12′S 174°19′W) is a rock col 2 nautical miles (3.7 km) southeast of Rougier Hill. The col is along the ridge that trends southward from Rougier Hill in the Cumulus Hills, Queen Maud Mountains. The name was proposed to Advisory Committee on Antarctic Names (US-ACAN) in 1971 by geologist David H. Elliot of the Ohio State University Institute of Polar Studies.

== Geology ==
This col is an important vertebrate fossil locality at which at least a dozen specimens of the mammal-like reptile Thrinaxodon were found. The fossiliferous sedimentary strata exposed at Thrinaxodon Col consist of alternating mudstones and sandstones of the lower Fremouw Formation. At this location, the base of the Fremouw Formation overlies a younger diabase sill. Diabase sills and dikes cross-cut the Fremouw Formation throughout the Thrinaxodon Col area and region.

The sandstones and mudstones exposed at Thrinaxodon Col are coupled together as fluvial fining-upward cycles. An individual cycle consists of a basal fluvial sandstone that grades upward into an upper overbank mudstone. An unconformity separates the top of the upper mudstone from the overlying basal sandstone of the overlying cycle. For example, the lowermost sandstone-mudstone cycle consists of a basal 1.3-metre (4.3 ft)-thick coarse-grained sandstone that grades upward into a 12-metre (39 ft)-m-thick medium-grained sandstone. The medium-grained sandstone contains claystone clasts, quartz pebbles, and fossil logs. Overlying and associated with the underlying sandstones is a 6 m of green-gray siltstone and mudstone with abundant fossil rootlets near the top.

== Fossils ==
Thrinaxodon Col is a Triassic vertebrate fossil locality from which fossil jaws and articulated skeletons have been collected. This fossil locality has yielded a far richer and well-preserved collection of vertebrate fossils than fossil localities associated Coalsack Bluff. Twelve of 14 specimens of Thrinaxodon liorhinus were collected from Thrinaxodon Col along with part of a large dicynodont tusk, specimens of Prolacerta broomi, and unidentified cynodontia.

At Thrinaxodon Col, the oldest vertebrate fossils occur in a sandstone bed about 7-metre (23 ft) above the top of the basal log-bearing sandstone. The Permian-Triassic boundary lies within this 7-metre (23 ft)-thick interval above the log-bearing sandstone and below the first appearance of vertebrate fossils. The Thrinaxodon liorhinus remains occur in Triassic sandstone that fills the upper portion of a paleochannel."

== See also ==
- Coalsack Bluff
- Gordon Valley
- Graphite Peak
