= Achernar (disambiguation) =

Achernar is the brightest star in the constellation of Eridanus

Achernar may also refer to:

- USS Achernar, US Navy cargo ship
- Achernar Island
- Mount Achernar
