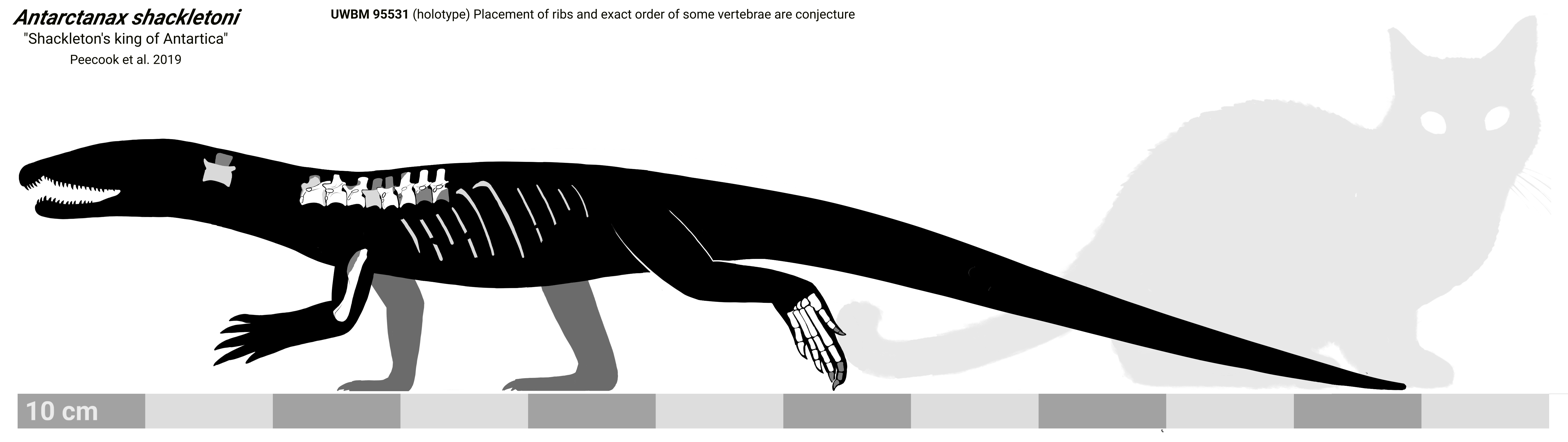
- Skeletal reconstruction showing the known remains

Scientific classification
- Kingdom: Animalia
- Phylum: Chordata
- Class: Reptilia
- Clade: Archosauriformes
- Genus: †Antarctanax; Peecook et al. 2019

Type species
- †Antarctanax shackletoni Peecook et al. 2019

= Antarctanax =

Antarctanax Temporal range: Early Triassic ~250 Ma

Extinct genus of reptiles

Antarctanax is a genus of basal archosauriform that lived during the Triassic in Antarctica. The type species is Antarctanax shackletoni. It was a reptile around the size of an iguana.

== Discovery and naming ==
During a paleontological expedition to the Transantarctic Mountains in 2010 and 2011, a small skeleton was discovered at Graphite Peak.

In 2019, the type species Antarctanax shackletoni was named and described by Brandon Robert Peecook, Roger Malcolm Harris Smith and Christian Alfred Sidor. The generic name combines a reference to Antarctica — itself derived from Greek anti, "opposite of", and arktikos, "of the Bear" — with a Greek anax, "ruler", a reference to the Archosauria, the "Ruling Reptiles". The specific name honours Ernest Shackleton, the polar explorer who named the Beardmore Glacier which runs along the Graphite Peak.

The holotype, UWBM 95531, was found in a layer of the lower Fremouw Formation, which dates to the Early Triassic. It contains eight vertebrae of the neck or back, ribs, the left humerus, all five metatarsals of the left foot, phalanges, among them the claws, of the left foot, and the almost complete right foot. Apart from the feet, the skeleton is largely disarticulated. It represents an adult individual.

== Description ==
The describing authors indicated a unique combination of traits that in themselves are not unique. These traits prove that Antarctanax is a distinct taxon. The cervicodorsal vertebrae, those spanning the rear neck and front back, have per side a lamina centrodiapophysealis anterior, a ridge running on the front underside of the side process towards the vertebral body. The cervicodorsal vertebrae have per side a lamina prezygodiapophysealis, a ridge running from the side process to the front articulation process. The cervicodorsal vertebrae have per side a lamina postzygodiapophysealis, a ridge running from the side process to the rear articulation process. The cervicodorsal vertebrae lack a lamina centrodiapophyseal posterior, a ridge running on the rear underside of the side process towards the vertebral body. The neck vertebrae have no keels on the underside. The neck vertebrae have deep pits to the side of the base of the neural spine. The back vertebrae have deep pits to the side of the base of the neural spine. The fourth metatarsal is more than 30% longer than the third metatarsal.

== Phylogeny ==
Antarctanax was, within the larger Archosauromorpha, placed within Archosauriformes. A cladistic analysis showed that it had a more derived position than the Proterosuchidae. It was in a polytomy with Fugusuchus and Sarmatosuchus, all three forms being more basal than Cuyosuchus, the Erythrosuchidae and the Eucrocopoda. The derived position of Antarctanax indicates that several more basal archosauromorph groups must have ghost lineages dating back to the Late Permian.
