= Coalsack Bluff =

Rock bluff in Antarctica

Coalsack Bluff (84°14′S 162°25′E) is a small rock bluff standing at the northern limits of Walcott Neve, 6 nautical miles (11 km) west-southwest of Bauhs Nunatak. It was so named by the New Zealand Geological Survey Antarctic Expedition (1961–62) because of the coal seams found running through the bluff.

== Paleontology ==
Coalsack Bluff exposes a paleontologically important, fossiliferous sequence of sedimentary rocks containing the Permian–Triassic boundary. This bluff is a fossil location that has yielded well preserved Permian and Triassic and plant, invertebrate, and vertebrate fossils and paleosols that reveal the paleoclimatic and paleontologic changes associated with the Permian–Triassic extinction event. It is the location where abundant fossils of Early Triassic tetrapods were first discovered in Antarctica. The vertebrate fossils found at this location are important in understanding the biostratigraphy and vertebrate paleontology of Permian and Triassic strata in Antarctica.

== See also ==
- Dirtbag Nunatak
- Graphite Peak
- Gordon Valley
- Masquerade Ridge
- Thrinaxodon Col
