= Rhigosaurus =

Rhigosaurus Temporal range: Lower Triassic

Scientific classification
- Domain: Eukaryota
- Kingdom: Animalia
- Phylum: Chordata
- Clade: Synapsida
- Clade: Therapsida
- Clade: †Therocephalia
- Superfamily: †Baurioidea
- Genus: †Rhigosaurus; Colbert & Kitching, 1981

Type species
- †Rhigosaurus glacialis (Colbert & Kitching, 1981)

Genus of synapsid

Rhigosaurus glacialis is a species of therocephalian therapsid. Its fossilized remains have been found in the Fremouw Formation of Antarctica and Australia. Part of a juvenile skull was found near Mount Kenyon, Antarctica. The holotype of the partial skull shows evidence of promiment upper and lower canine teeth.

The genus name Rhigosaurus comes from the Greek rhigos, meaning cold, and sauros, meaning lizard or reptile. The name was coined by Edwin Harris Colbert and James William Kitching, who described the species in 1981 based on a fossil found in 1970-1971. They described it as robust and small in size. The fossil skull was 36 mm (1.4 in) long and 26 mm (1.0 in) across at the widest point.

Modern paleontologists such as Christian Sidor consider the species a nomen dubium. Sidor describes it as an "indeterminate juvenile baurioid" and suggests that the name Rhigosaurus be discontinued.
