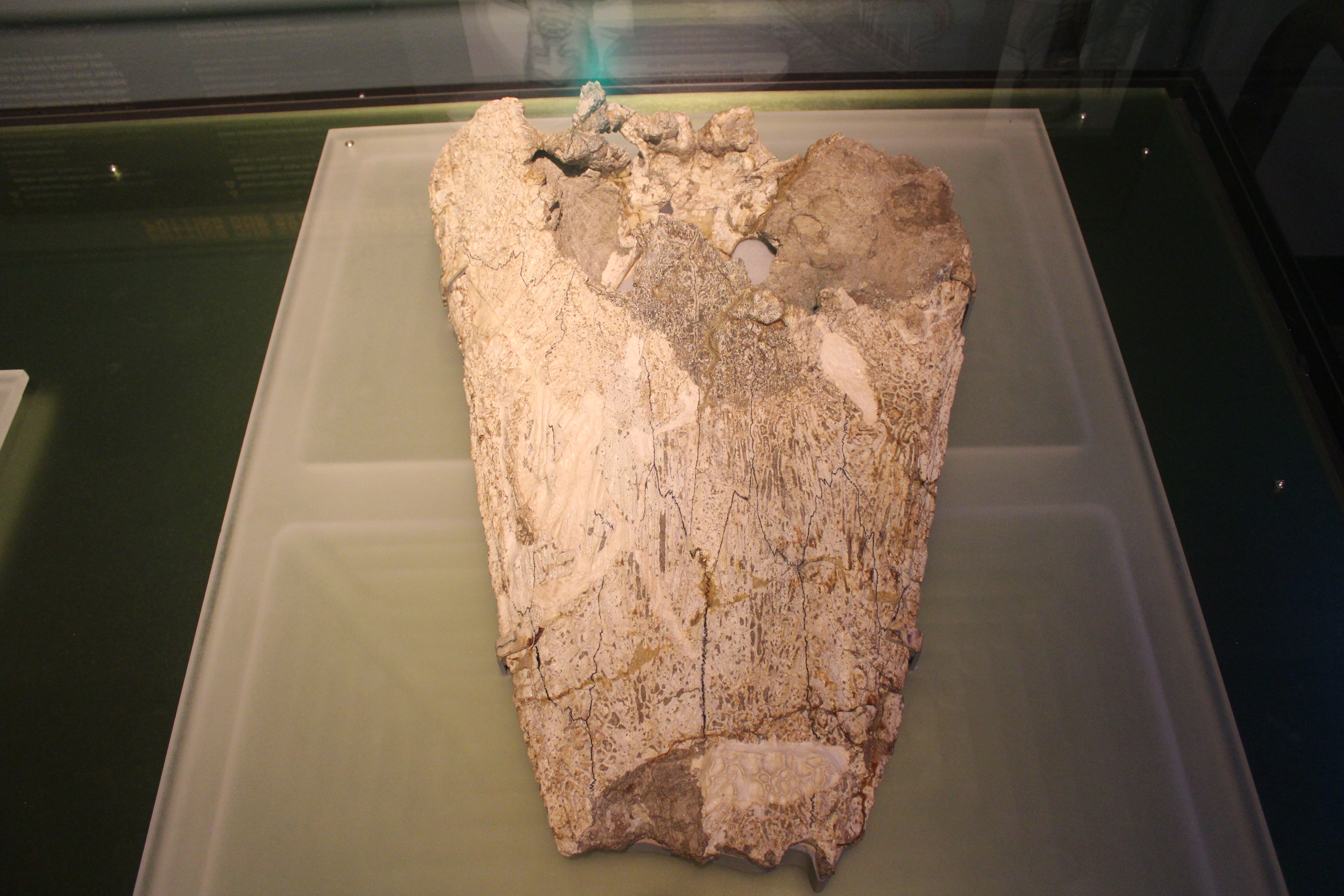
- Holotype skull on display at the Field Museum of Natural History.

Scientific classification
- Kingdom: Animalia
- Phylum: Chordata
- Clade: Tetrapoda
- Order: †Temnospondyli
- Suborder: †Stereospondyli
- Clade: †Capitosauria
- Superfamily: †Mastodonsauroidea
- Genus: †Antarctosuchus; Sidor, Steyer & Hammer, 2014

Type species
- †Antarctosuchus polyodon Sidor, Steyer & Hammer, 2014

= Antarctosuchus =

Antarctosuchus Temporal range: Middle Triassic, ~246.7–237 Ma

Extinct genus of temnospondyls

Antarctosuchus is an extinct genus of capitosauroid temnospondyl known from the Middle Triassic upper Fremouw Formation in the Transantarctic Mountains of Antarctica. It contains a single species, Antarctosuchus polyodon.

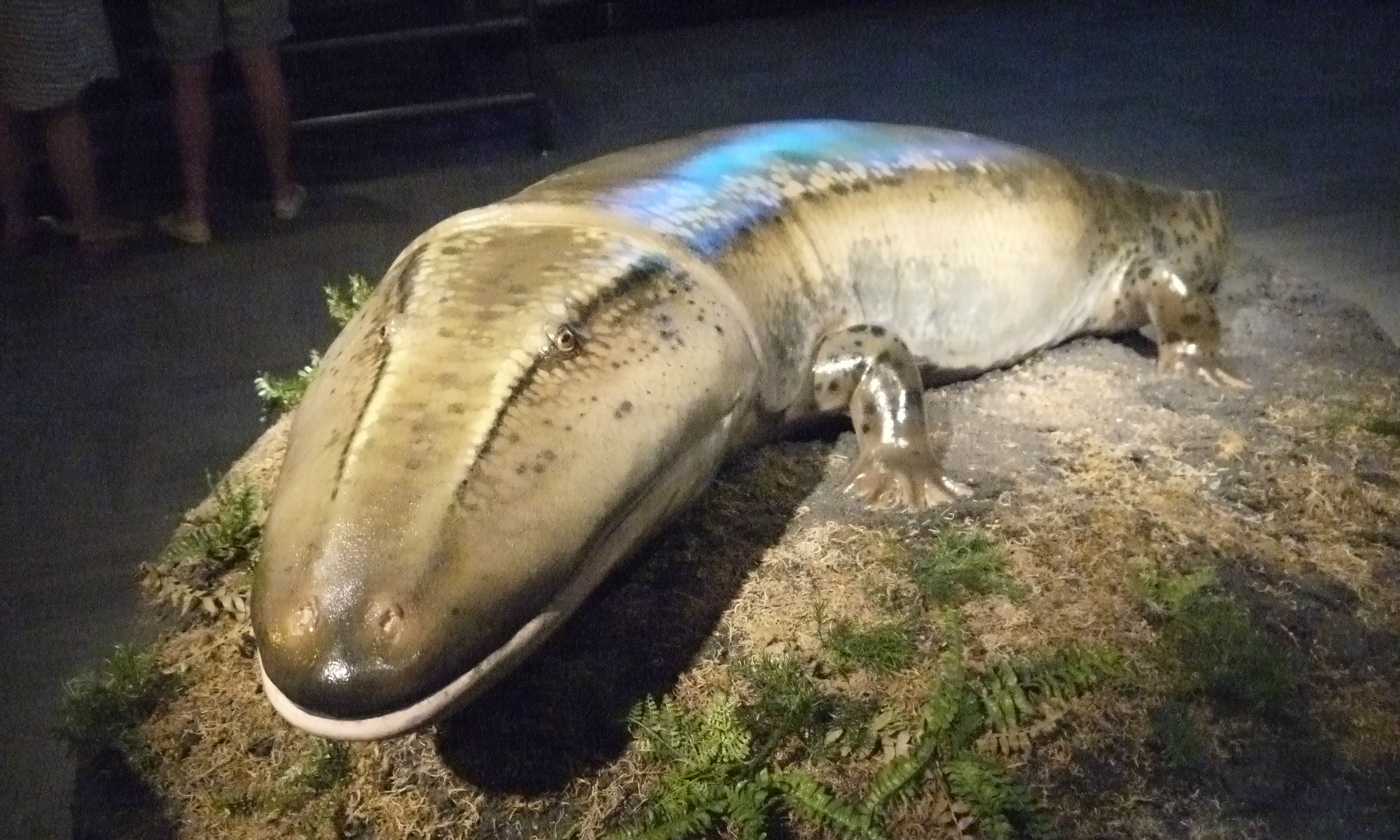
Model of Antarctosuchus polyodon at the Field Museum of Natural History in Chicago

== Discovery ==
Antarctosuchus was named by Christian A. Sidor, J. Sébastien Steyer, and William R. Hammer in 2014 and the type species is Antarctosuchus polyodon. The generic name refers to Antarctica, where the only known specimen was collected, and suchus, a common suffix for temnospondyls Latinized from the Greek souchos, an Egyptian crocodile god. The specific name, polyodon, is derived from the Greek πολύς (polús) "much", "many" and ὀδών (odon), "tooth", in reference to its unique teeth morphology. Antarctosuchus is known solely from its holotype, a large and relatively complete skull. It was collected form the upper Fremouw Formation in the central Transantarctic Mountains of Antarctica, dating to the Middle Triassic. To date, Antarctosuchus polyodon is the only other endemic temnospondyl species from the formation apart from Kryostega collinsoni, although indeterminate remains referred to benthosuchids and a cranial fragment assigned to Parotosuchus sp. have also been collected.

== Description ==
As its specific name suggests, Antarctosuchus polyodon is distinguished by the possession of numerous, extremely small maxillary, palatine, and ectopterygoid teeth, a dental pattern that suggests specialization on small prey, possibly invertebrates. Other autapomorphic features of this taxon are a parachoanal tooth row that extends far posterior to the choana and occipital condyles which are set close to the midline. Antarctosuchus possesses a relatively flat skull, low occiput and well-developed sensory canals, suggesting an aquatic lifestyle. A phylogenetic analysis places Antarctosuchus within Capitosauroidea, a clade of derived Triassic stereospondyls as the sister taxon to Paracyclotosaurus crookshanki from the Triassic Denwai Formation of India.
