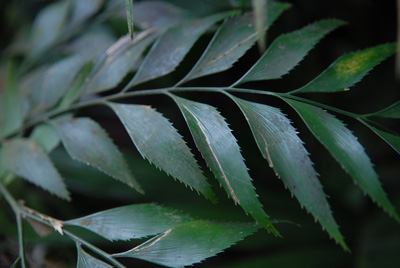

Conservation status
- Least Concern (IUCN 3.1)

Scientific classification
- Kingdom: Plantae
- Clade: Tracheophytes
- Clade: Gymnospermae
- Division: Cycadophyta
- Class: Cycadopsida
- Order: Cycadales
- Family: Zamiaceae
- Genus: Bowenia
- Species: B. serrulata

Binomial name
- Bowenia serrulata (W.Bull) Chamb.
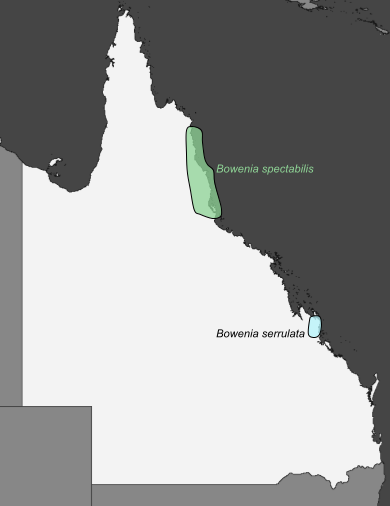

= Bowenia serrulata =

Byfield fern

Species of cycad

Bowenia serrulata, the Byfield fern, is a cycad in the family Stangeriaceae. Its bipinnate fronds, arising from a subterranean caudex, give it the appearance of a fern. However it is not a fern as its vernacular name and appearance suggest. It is endemic to the vicinity of Byfield, Australia.

== Gallery ==
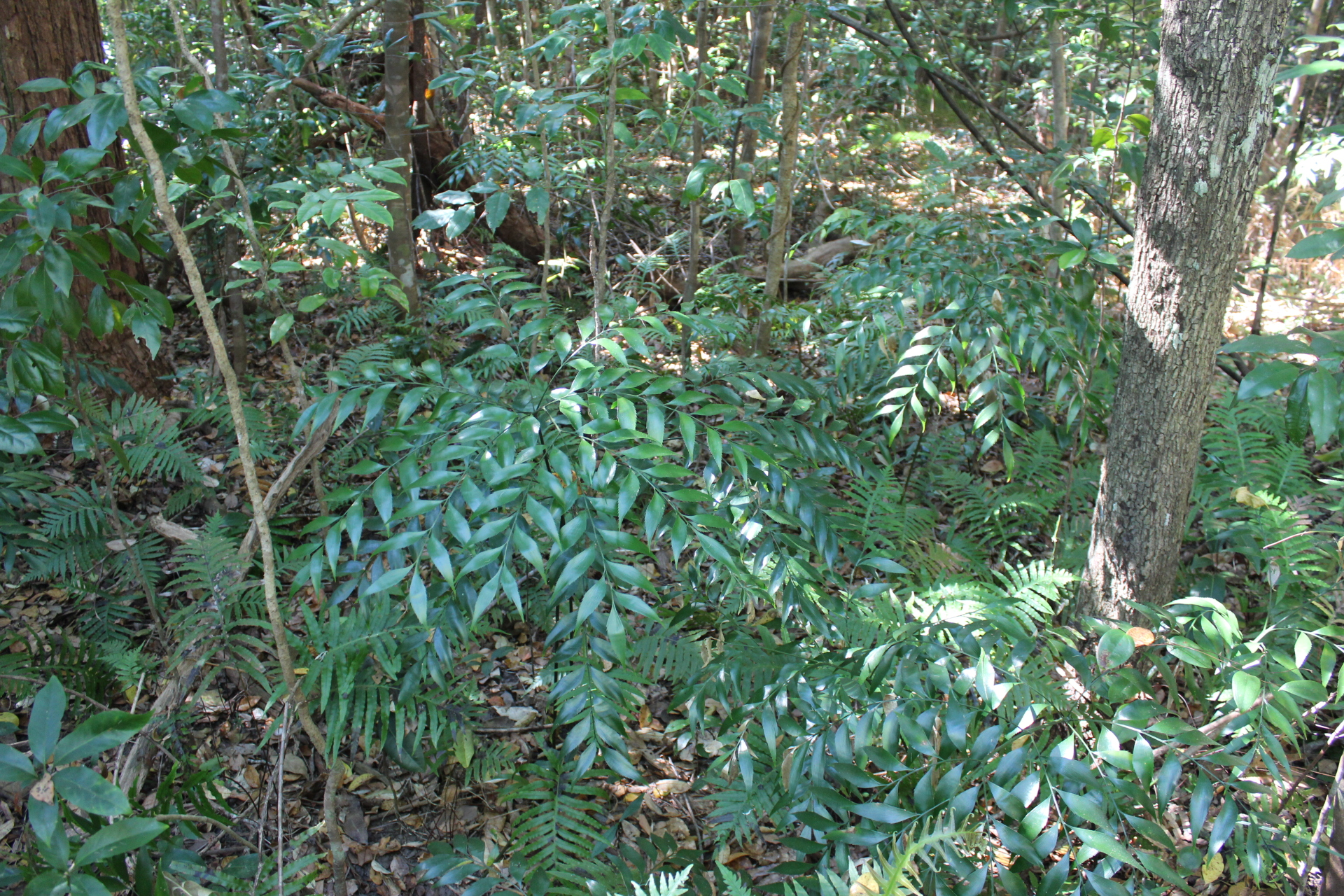
Bowenia serrulata growing in transition forest near Byfield, in the Capricornia region of Queensland, Australia

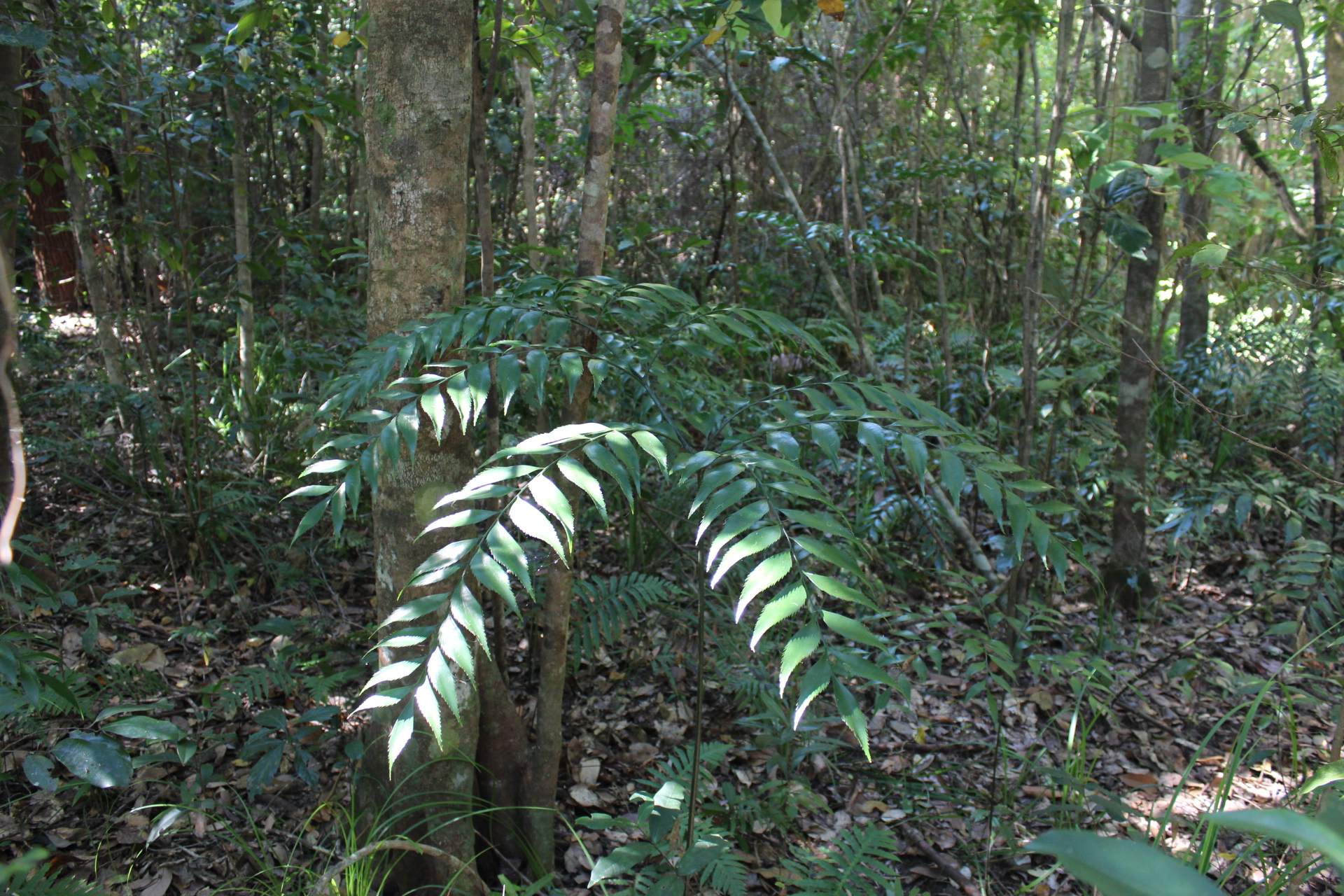
Bowenia serrulata growing in transition forest near Byfield, in the Capricornia region of Queensland, Australia

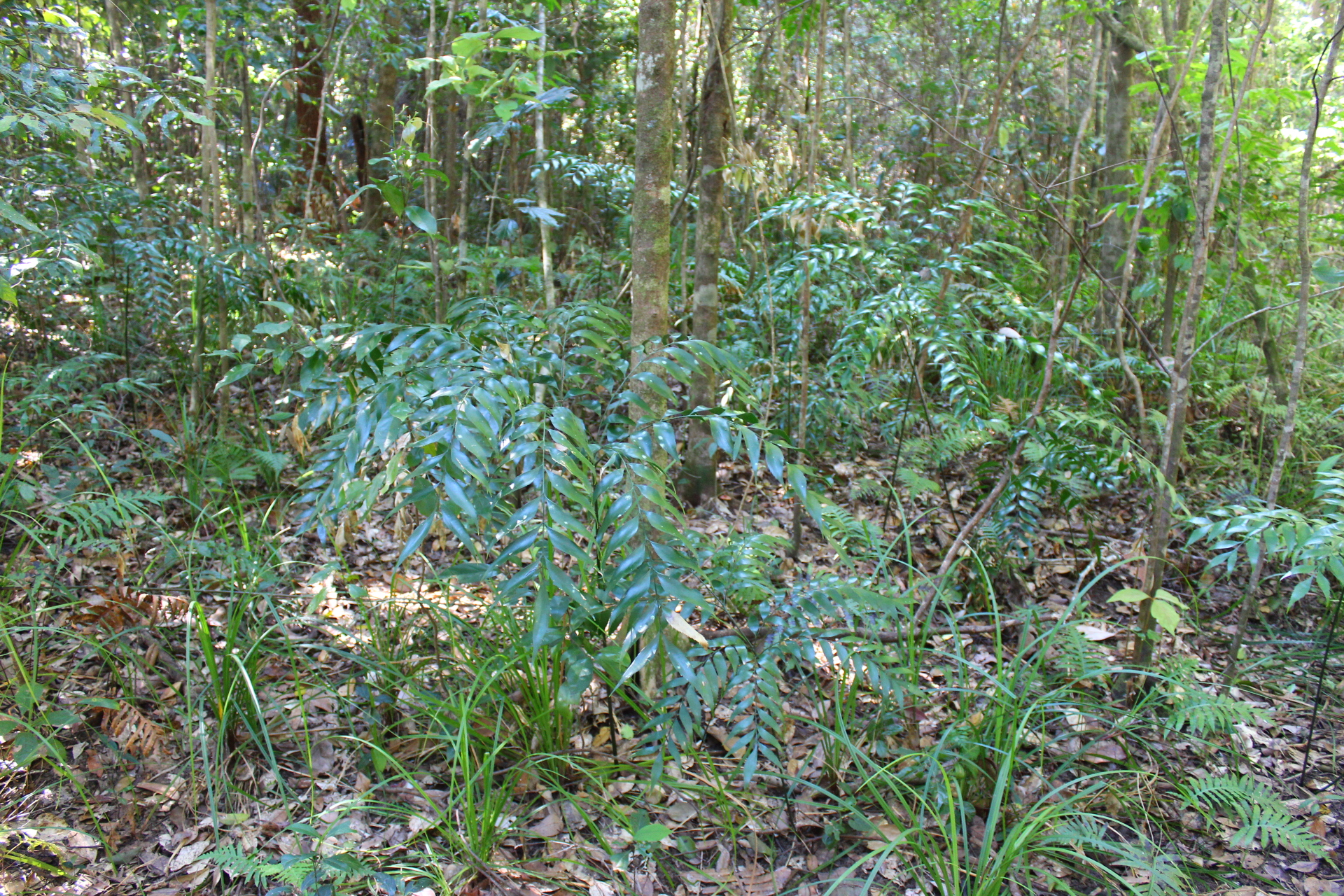
Bowenia serrulata growing in transition forest near Byfield, in the Capricornia region of Queensland, Australia

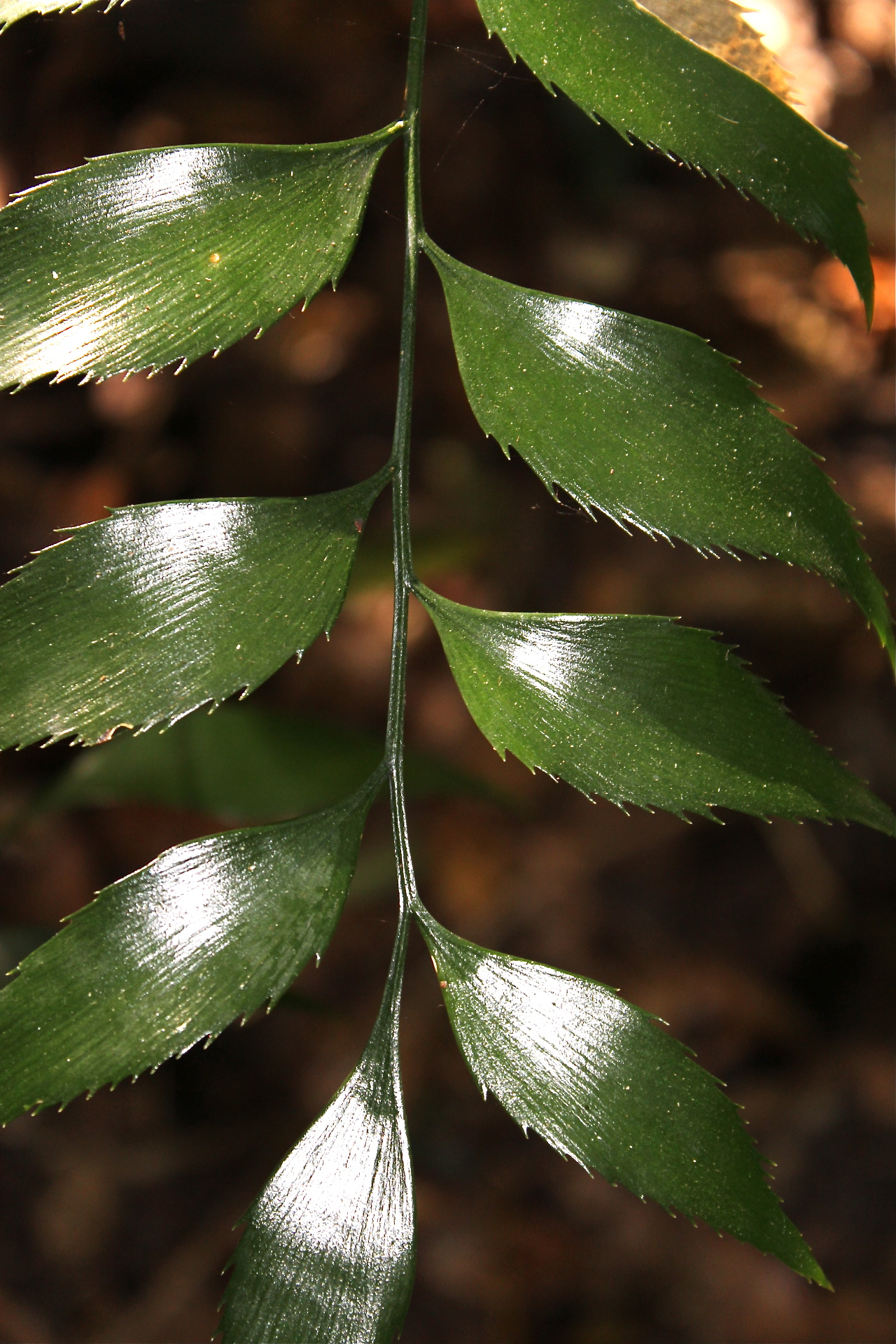
Pinnae of Bowenia serrulata

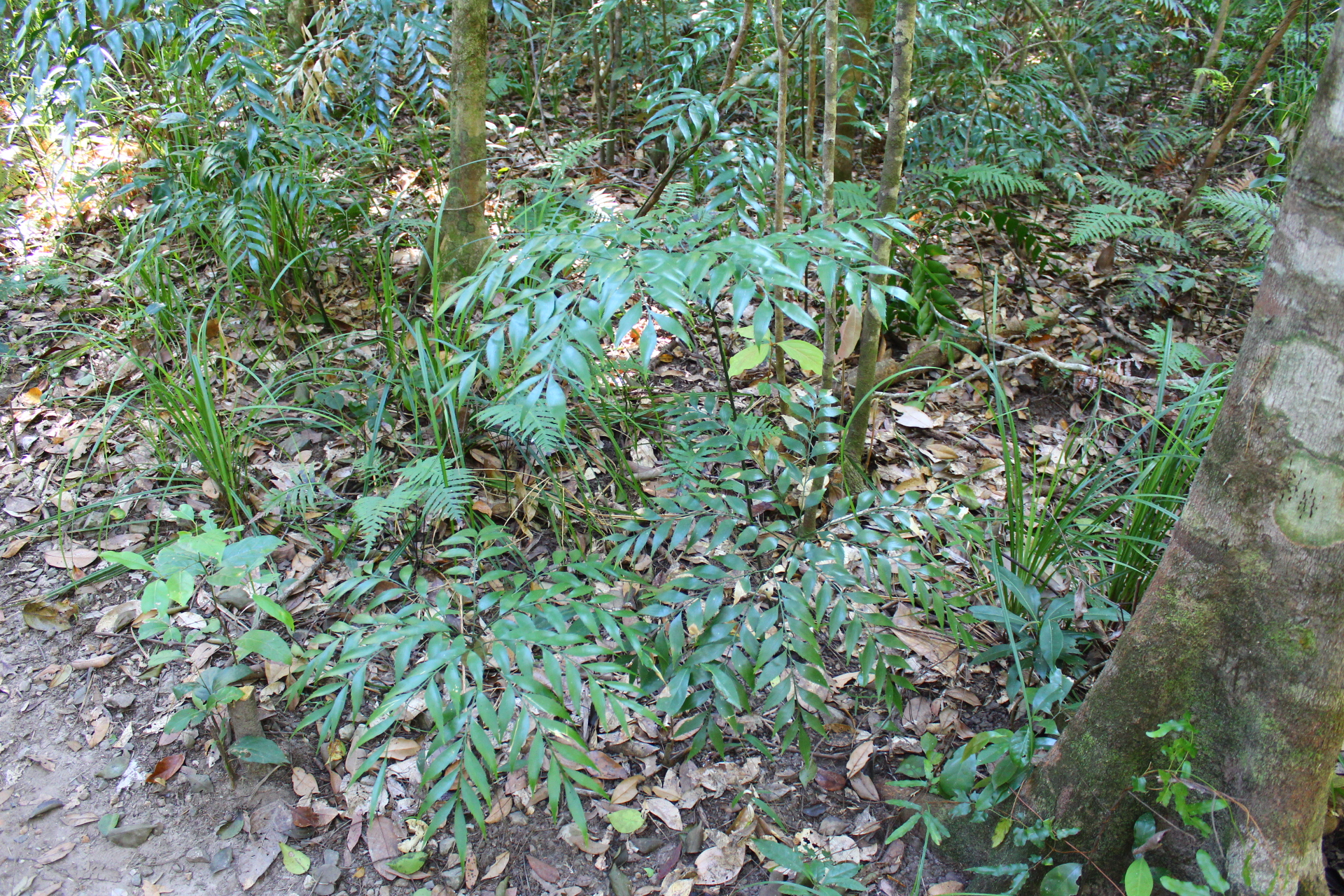
Bowenia serrulata growing in transition forest near Byfield, in the Capricornia region of Queensland, Australia

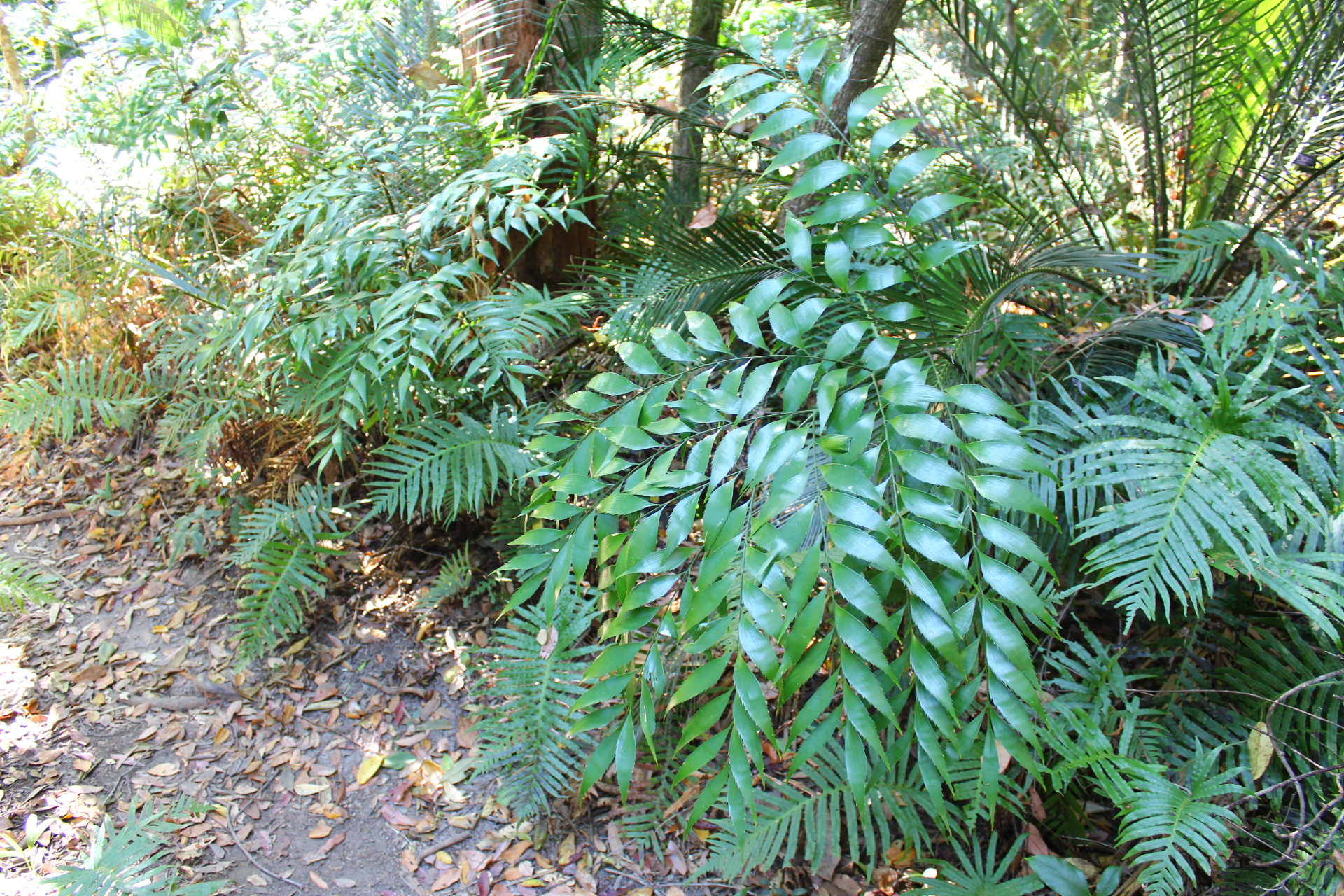
Bowenia serrulata growing in transition forest near Byfield, in the Capricornia region of Queensland, Australia
