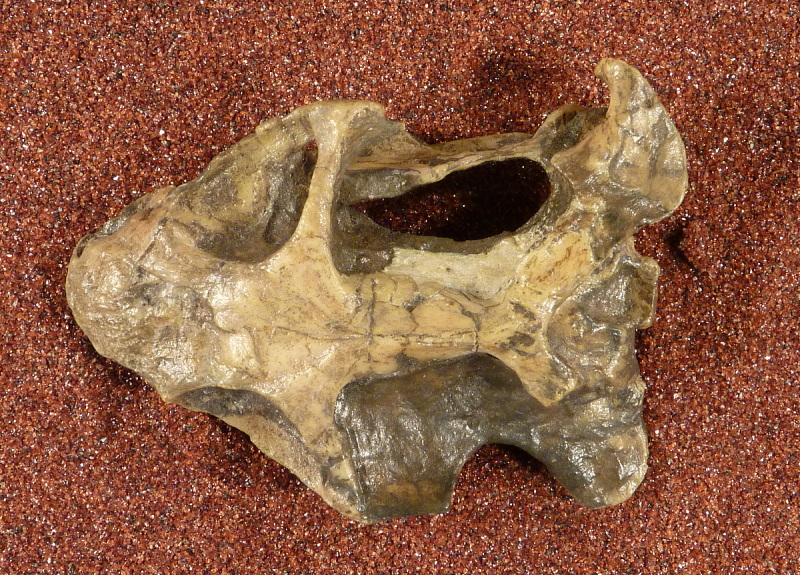
- Kombuisia frerensis

Scientific classification
- Kingdom: Animalia
- Phylum: Chordata
- Clade: Synapsida
- Clade: Therapsida
- Clade: †Anomodontia
- Clade: †Dicynodontia
- Family: †Kingoriidae
- Genus: †Kombuisia; Hotton, 1974

Species
- †K. frerensis Hotton, 1974 (type); †K. antarctica Fröbisch et al., 2010

= Kombuisia =

Kombuisia Temporal range: Early to Middle Triassic

Extinct genus of dicynodonts

Kombuisia (from Afrikaans "kombuis", meaning "kitchen", from a nickname for its discoverer James Kitching) is an extinct genus of dicynodont from Early to Middle Triassic (Induan to Anisian) of South Africa and Antarctica. Two species are described for the genus: Kombuisia frerensis (type) and Kombuisia antarctica.

Dicynodonts were a diverse clade that inhabited the Earth from the Middle Permian to the Late Triassic. Kombuisia is one of few species to survive the mass extinction event in the late Permian. Kombuisia are non-mammalian synapsid herbivores. Specimens of this genus were discovered in the 1960s and 1970s and years later were determined to be two different species of the genus.

The two species were found in diverse areas, K. frerensis in South Africa and K. antarctica in Antarctica. This indicated that this genus existed in a wider biographical region in the southern hemisphere of Pangaea and believed by some to indicate the migration to Antarctica to avoid the rise in global temperatures that led to the mass extinction. Migration to avoid global warming has been highly controversial because many of the fossils that are found in this region are juvenile and of small body size. But so far no Permian vertebrate fossils are known from Antarctica, making it less likely that they were already living there prior to the event.

Originally the specimens that were collected in Antarctica were considered to belong to Kingoria (now known as Dicynodontoides). The specimens were originally catalogued in the American Museum of Natural History as Kingoria, however, with no formal reasoning for this categorization, this has since been revised with more up-to-date knowledge of features and speciation.

Kingoria was defined early on as a close relative to Kombuisia and Hotton describes the two genera as sister taxa. Dicynodontoides and K. frerensis were relatively close geographically during their time of existence. Kingoria fossils are found in the mid to southern region of Africa. In a re-evaluation of the cranial anatomy of K. frerensis using the rule of parsimony the most recent conclusion is that Kingoria and Kombuisia are sister taxa in the clade Kingoriidae.

== Discovery and geographic range ==
Kombuisia frerensis was found in the Cynognathus Assemblage Zone in South Africa. The zone is subdivided into 3 layers and encompasses the boundary of Late Early Triassic and Early Middle Triassic period. The specimen was collected from the middle zone, B, and considered to of the early Anisian age. The genus was named after the discoverer of its fossil, James Kitching, who was nicknamed "kombuis", the Afrikaans word for "kitchen", during his time in military service. The species was named after the town of Lady Frere, located just 1.6 kilometres (0.99 mi) from where it was discovered.

There is no evidence of the exact stratigraphic location of K. antarctica. The specimens are from the central Transantarctic Mountains and were found at Shenk Peak (AMNH 9562) and Graphite Peak (AMNH 9545). The fossils were found in the lower member of the 3 members of the Fremouw Formation. The lower member refers to the Early Triassic and Late Permian in some areas.

== Classification of species ==
=== Early controversial specification ===
Defining the species and lineages of these fossils was difficult due to the lack of preservation and minimal cranial fossils that had been collected and catalogued. There are two types of Kombuisia species. One of these, K. frerensis, was collected in 1961 by J. W. Kitching and Nicholas Hotton in South Africa, and the other was collected in the early 1970s from the Fremouw Formation of the Transantarctic Mountains. The specimens from South Africa were catalogued in the National Museum of Natural History and were later moved to the Bernard Price Institute for Paleontological Research in Johannesburg. The specimens from the Transantarctic Mountains are catalogued in the American Museum of Natural History (AMNH) and until 2009 had not been correctly identified. Christian Sidor, Kenneth Angielcyzk, and Jorg Frobisch worked to define this specimen as a new species of Kombuisia. Prior to 2009, the species was considered to be part of the genus Kingoria, but there was no written description and evaluation of the specification.

The similarities in the skull features between Kingoria and Kombuisia made classification of the species very difficult. The two both share common traits such as a lack of premaxillary ridges and the midline ridge of the vomerine is depressed. Unlike any other dicynodont the two genera share a similar feature of a longitudinal ridge at the edge of the premaxilla. Hotton analyzed the small skull that was found just south of Lady Frere, Cape Province, north of the Cacadu River in South Africa. The specimen had a complete lower jaw and stapes that proved pivotal in the description and definition of the species. K. frerensis has many similar features as Kingoria which made it difficult to diagnose as a new species. The two share features such as no post-canine teeth, a wider inter orbital bar than inter temporal bar, and the length of the post orbital region equals the distance from the post orbital bar to the snout.

=== Current specification ===
The differences that make the two genera distinguishable and the species distinguishable from other dicynodonts are seen in the dentary. The ventral profile slopes upward and forward from the splenial to the tip of the beak, the front and side margins of the beak are sharp, and the symphysis tapers to a squared-off anterior margin as opposed to being parallel sided. The most distinctive feature that defined the new genus at the time was the lack of a pineal opening. This led Hotton to the determination that the fossils belonged to a new Dicynodont species, Kombuisia frerensis. Until 2009 this was the only species of the genus that was thought to have existed. In 2009 Christian Sidor, Jorg Frobisch, and Kenneth Angielczyk identified the new species as K. antarctica. The two species had been catalogued in the American Museum of Natural History as specimens AMNH 9562 and 9545. One of the most definitive differences between the two species is the slit-like pineal opening in K. antarctica, which is absent from K. frerensis. There is also no contact between the post orbitals in K. antartica, which is a feature seen in the K. frerensis specimens.

== Cranial description ==
=== K. frerensis ===
- Fused premaxilla
- Absence of a pineal foramen
- Inverted triangular shape of the interparietal bone
- Lack of fusion of articular and prearticular bones
- Presence of an elongate, slender parietal posterolateral process that extends onto the occipital edge of the skull roof.
- Skull length approximately 76.8 mm

=== K. antarctica ===
- Skull length of approximately 73 mm (AMNH 9562)
- Skull length of approximately 69 mm (AMNH 9545)
- Lacking tusks
- Lack of premaxillary or postcanine teeth
- Antorbital region is greatly abbreviated
- Slit-like pineal foramen
- Anterior tip of the snout is rounded
- Narrow intertemporal region
- Parietals exposed as a narrow ridge between the ventrolaterally sloping postorbitals.
- No clarity whether K. antarctica possesses the elongate posterolateral process of the parietal found in K. frerensis due to lack of preservation of both existing specimens.

== Paleobiology ==
The lack of a complete skeleton makes it difficult to re-create what the species may have looked like; however, analysis of the skull allows for an estimate of the animal's body size. The skull length of K. frerensis and K. antarctica differs by only 4–8 mm, K. frerensis being the larger of the two. While the exact body size cannot be determined, the skull size indicates that the genus was relatively small in body size.

Since Fröbisch reviewed the cranial anatomy of K. frerensis and was able to closely relate the genus to Kingoria, subsequent attempts to re-create the species represent similar body plans. However, Kingoria are typically just over 50% larger than that of Kombuisia. It has often been proposed that Antarctica was a destination of migration to avoid the global warming in the Middle to Late Permian. However, further analysis of the body size of many of the specimens found in the lower member of the Fremouw Formation indicated that these species already existed in Antartica. Kombuisia provides knowledge of specimens in both South Africa and Antarctica; in addition, examination of the cranial length and features indicates a small body size for Kombuisia—too small to migrate seasonally from the Cynognathus Assemblage Zone in South Africa to the central Transantarctic Mountains, which provides further argument against the proposed hypothesis. Evidence of tetrapod burrows is also found in the lower member of the Fremouw Formation. These burrows indicate that the environment may have been too harsh for a tetrapod to live above ground and suggest a permanent subterranean residence of many of the species in Antarctica.

This may also suggest that K. antarctica was fossorial, like many of the other tetrapods that existed in this environment around the same time. According to Dr. Angielczyk, "K. antarctica was about the size of a small house cat, considerably different from today’s mammals – it likely laid eggs, didn't nurse its young, and didn't have fur, and it is uncertain whether it was warm blooded."
