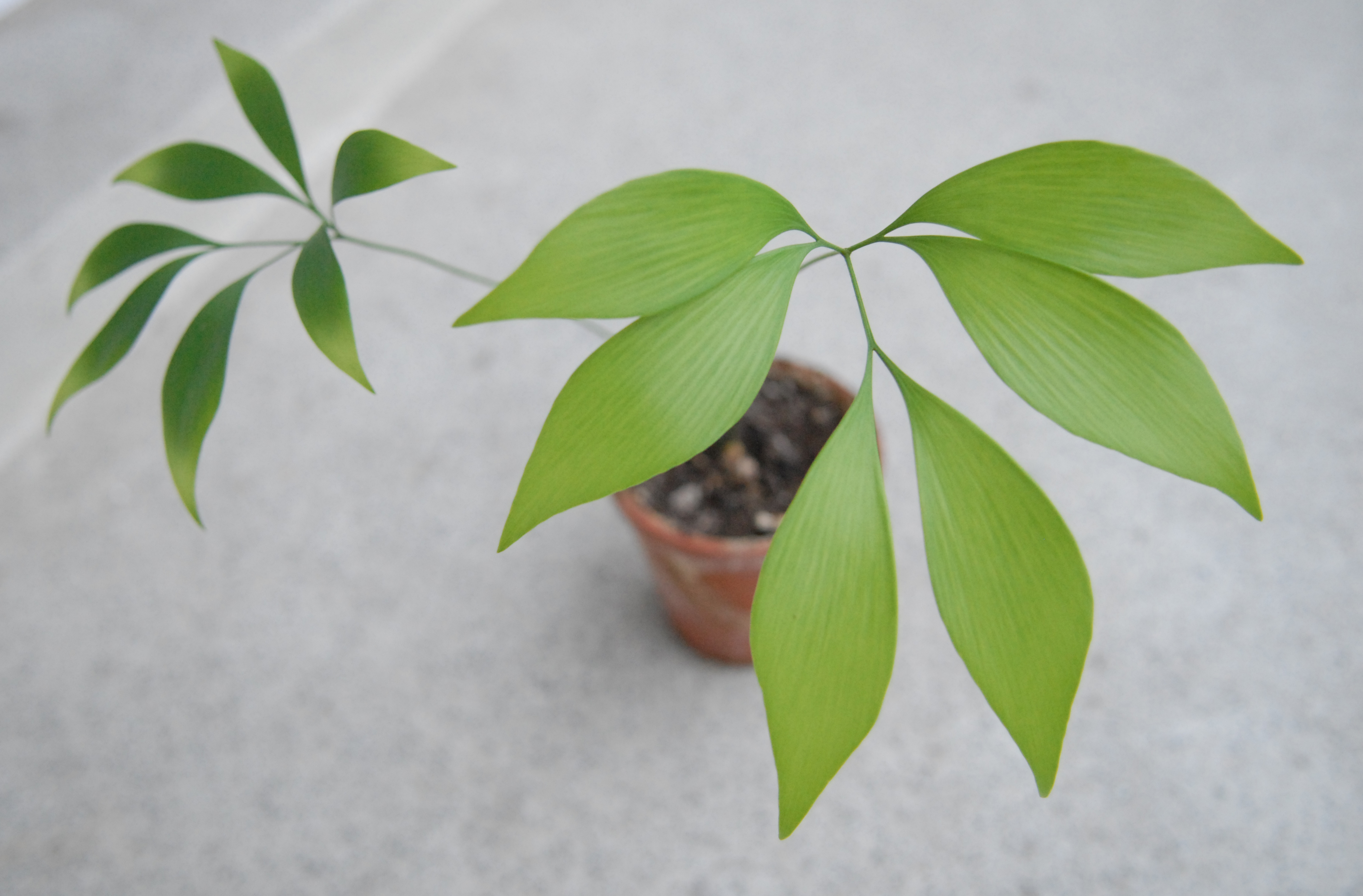

Conservation status
- Least Concern (IUCN 3.1)

Scientific classification
- Kingdom: Plantae
- Clade: Embryophytes
- Clade: Tracheophytes
- Clade: Spermatophytes
- Clade: Gymnospermae
- Division: Cycadophyta
- Class: Cycadopsida
- Order: Cycadales
- Family: Zamiaceae
- Genus: Bowenia
- Species: B. spectabilis

Binomial name
- Bowenia spectabilis Hook. ex Hook.f.
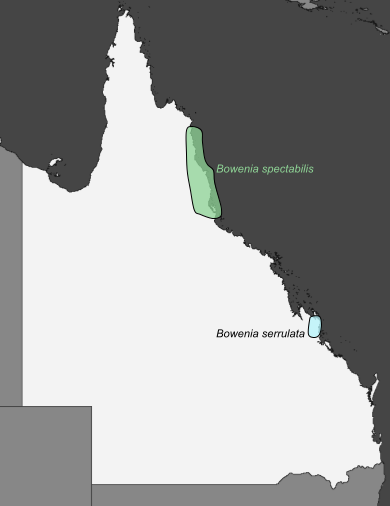
- Range of Bowenia spectabilis (in green)

= Bowenia spectabilis =

Species of cycad

Bowenia spectabilis is a species of cycad in the family Zamiaceae. It is endemic to northeast Queensland, Australia. Its natural habitat is subtropical or tropical moist lowland forests.

== Range ==
Bowenia spectabilis is found in northeastern Queensland from the McIlwraith Range on the Cape York Peninsula south to near Tully. It is a rainforest species, growing close to streams and on sheltered slopes in lowland wet sclerophyll forest, but also at an altitude of up to 700 metres in the Atherton Tableland.

The 1889 book 'The Useful Native Plants of Australia' records that the yam-like rhizome is used for food by the Indigenous Australians.

== Gallery ==
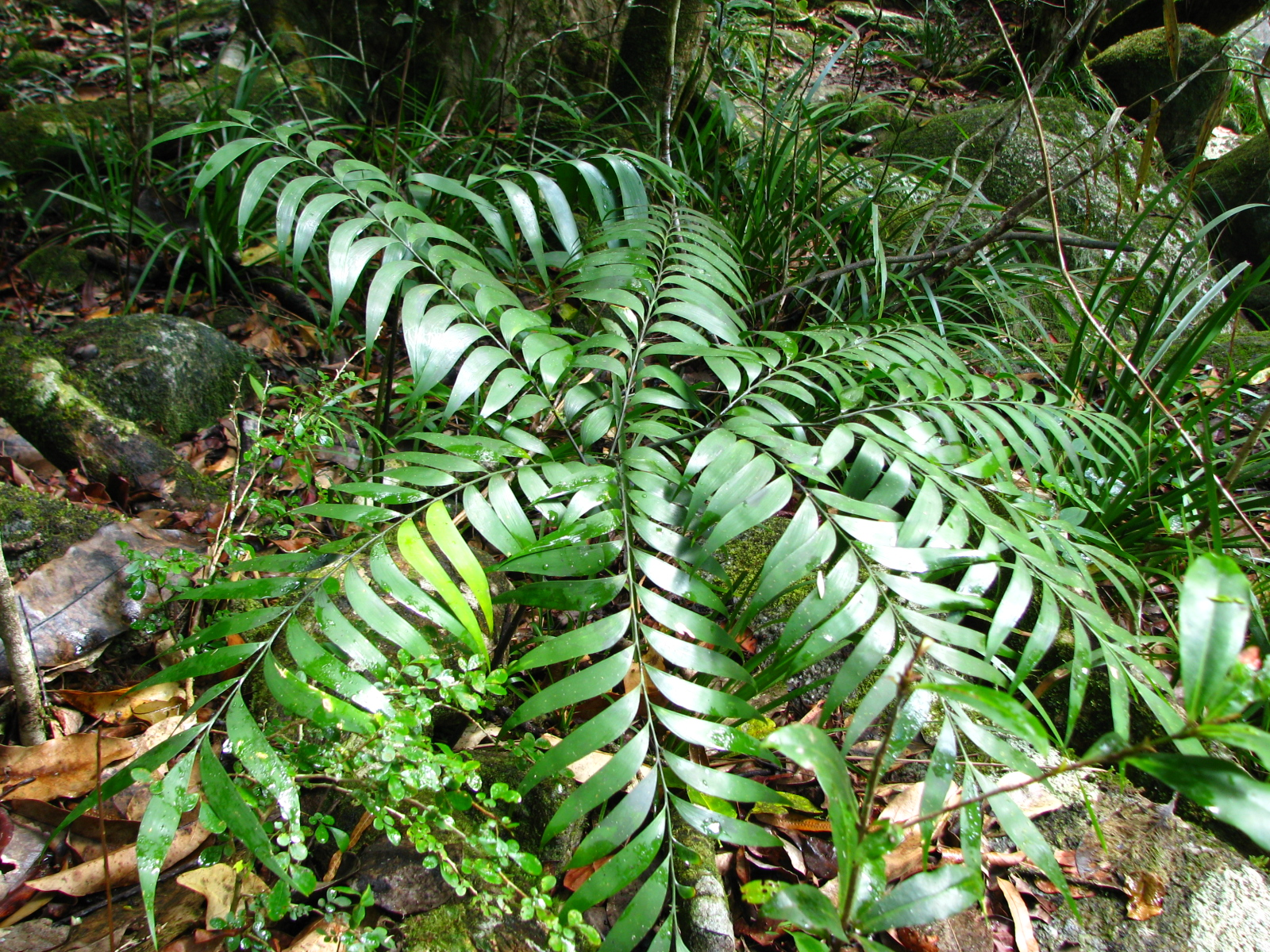
Bowenia spectabilis at Mossman Gorge, Queensland, Australia

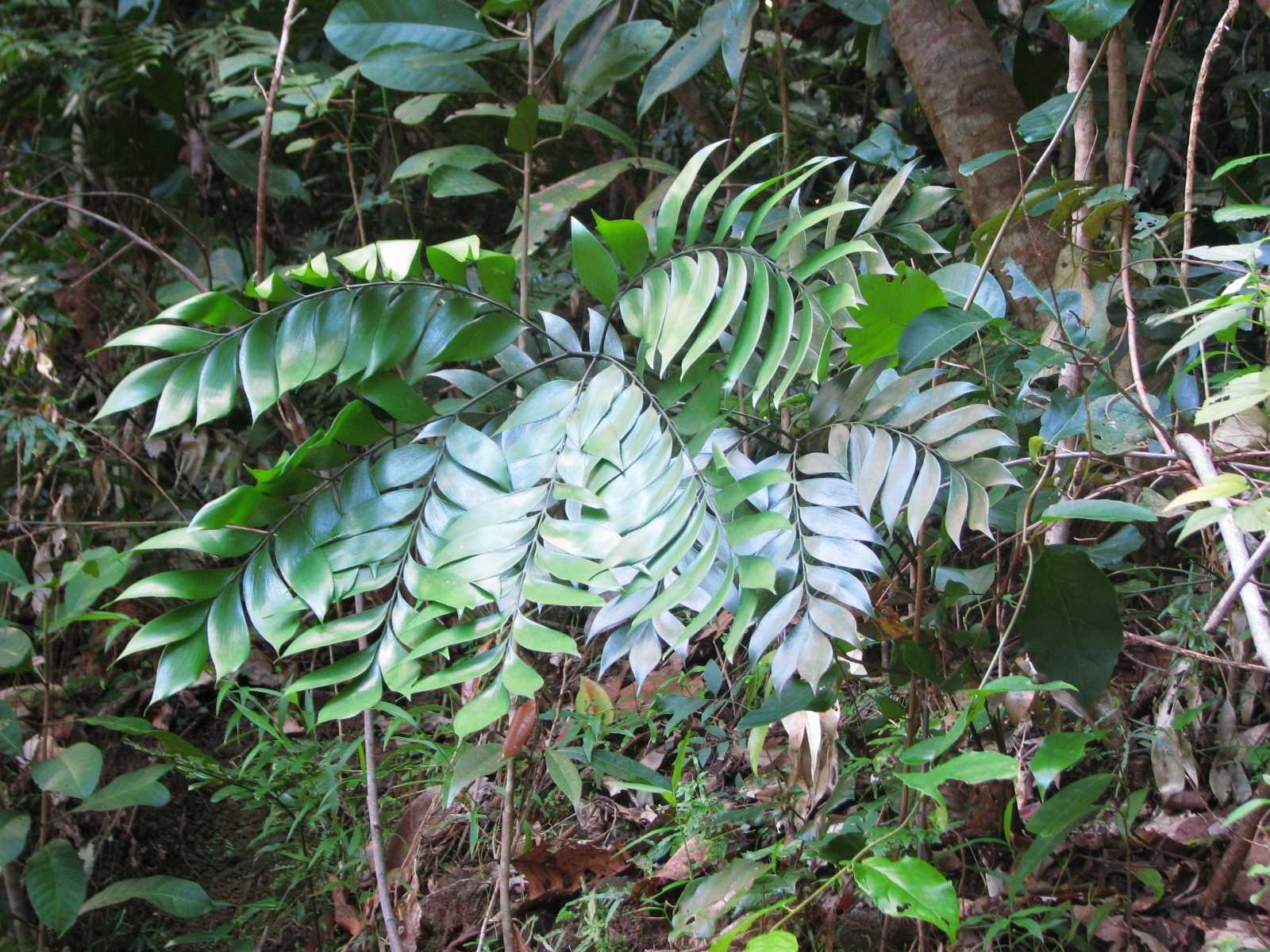
Bowenia spectabilis (typical form) in the Daintree Rainforest in northeast Queensland, Australia

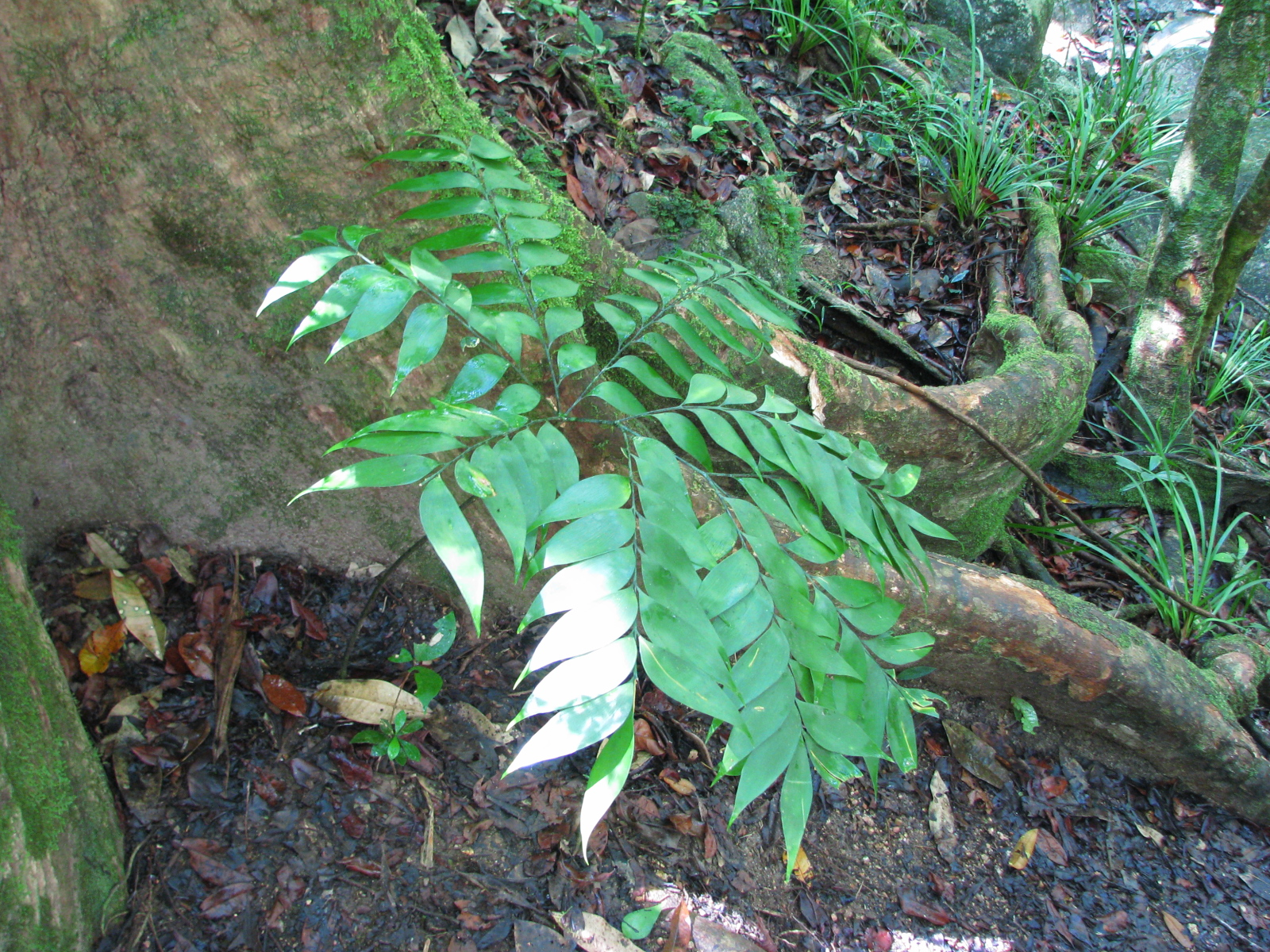
Bowenia spectabilis at Mossman Gorge, Queensland, Australia

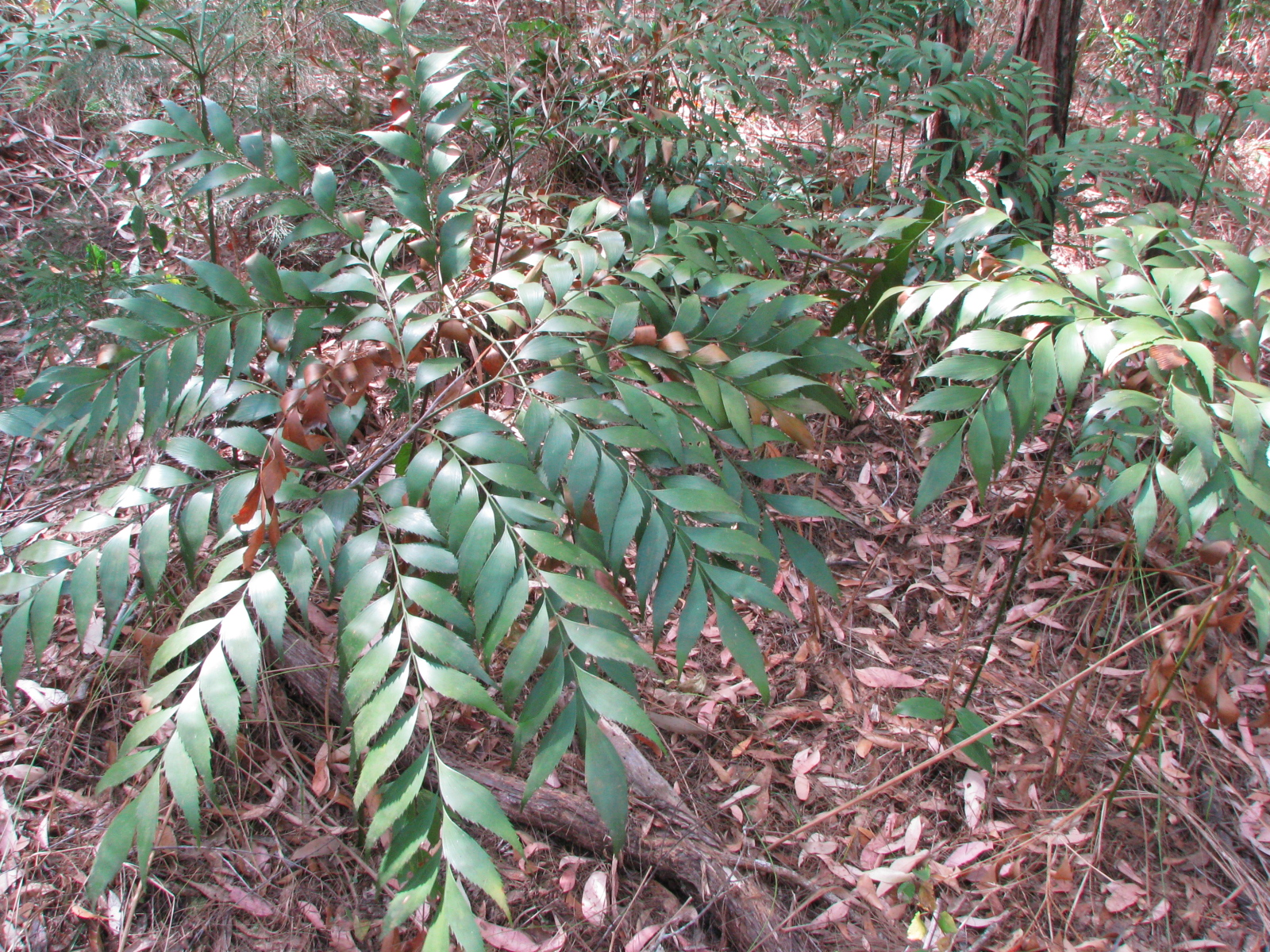
Bowenia Lake Tinaroo form in sclerophyll woodland near Lake Tinaroo, Atherton Tableland, far north Queensland

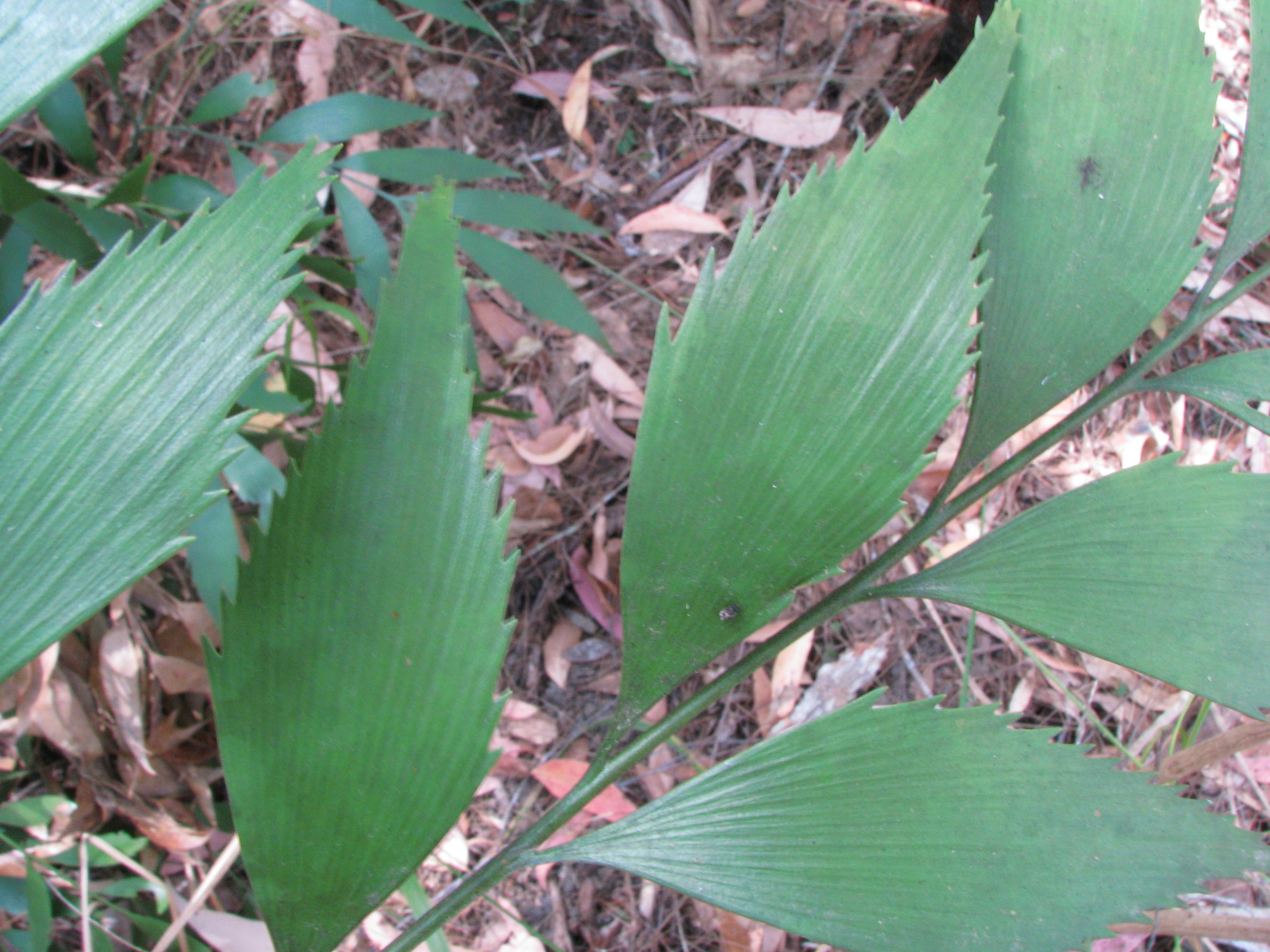
Serrulate margin of the pinnae on a wild plant of Bowenia Lake Tinaroo form, at Lake Tinaroo, Atherton Tableland, Queensland, Australia

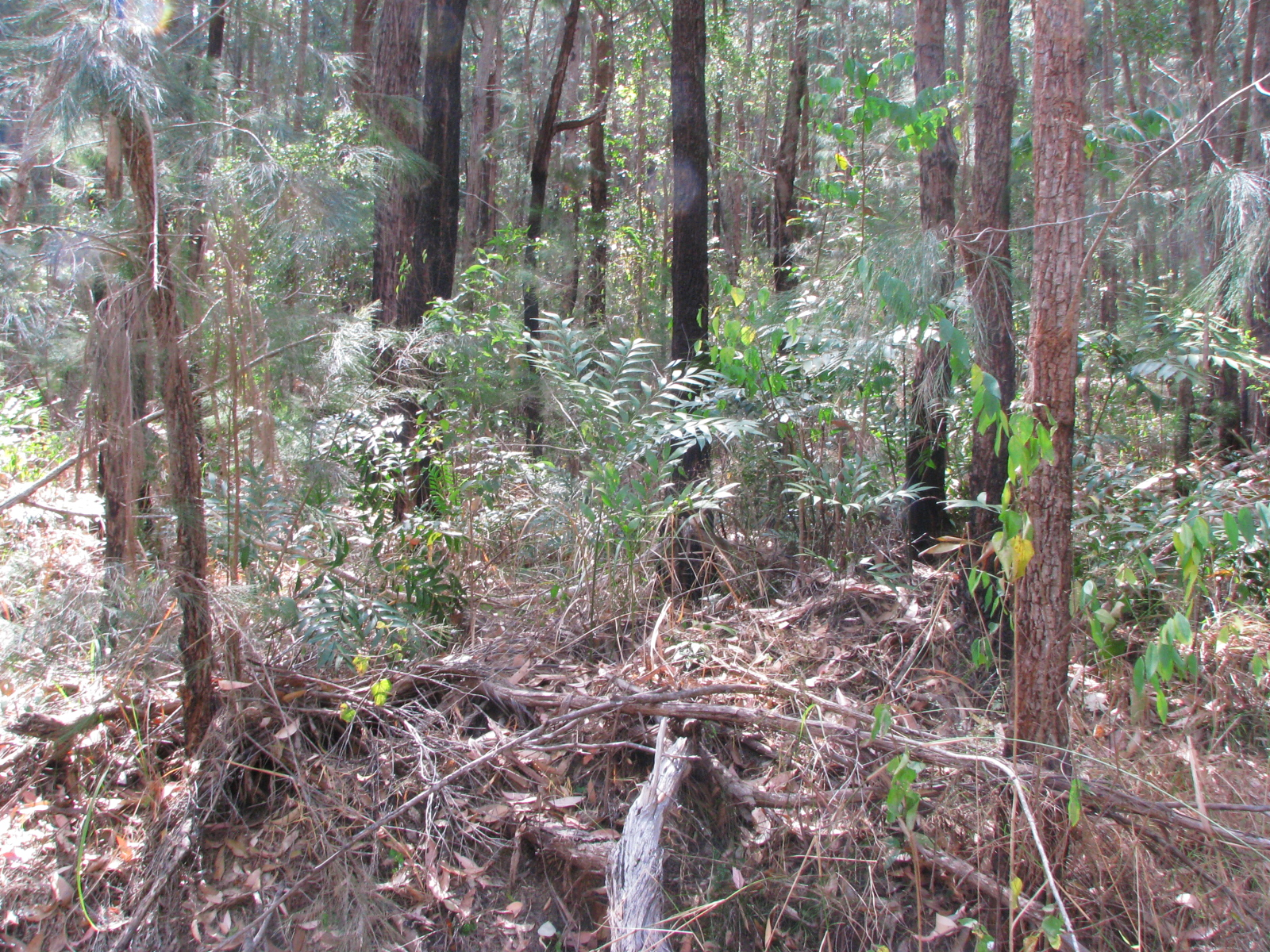
Bowenia Lake Tinaroo form in sclerophyll woodland near Lake Tinaroo, Atherton Tableland, far north Queensland

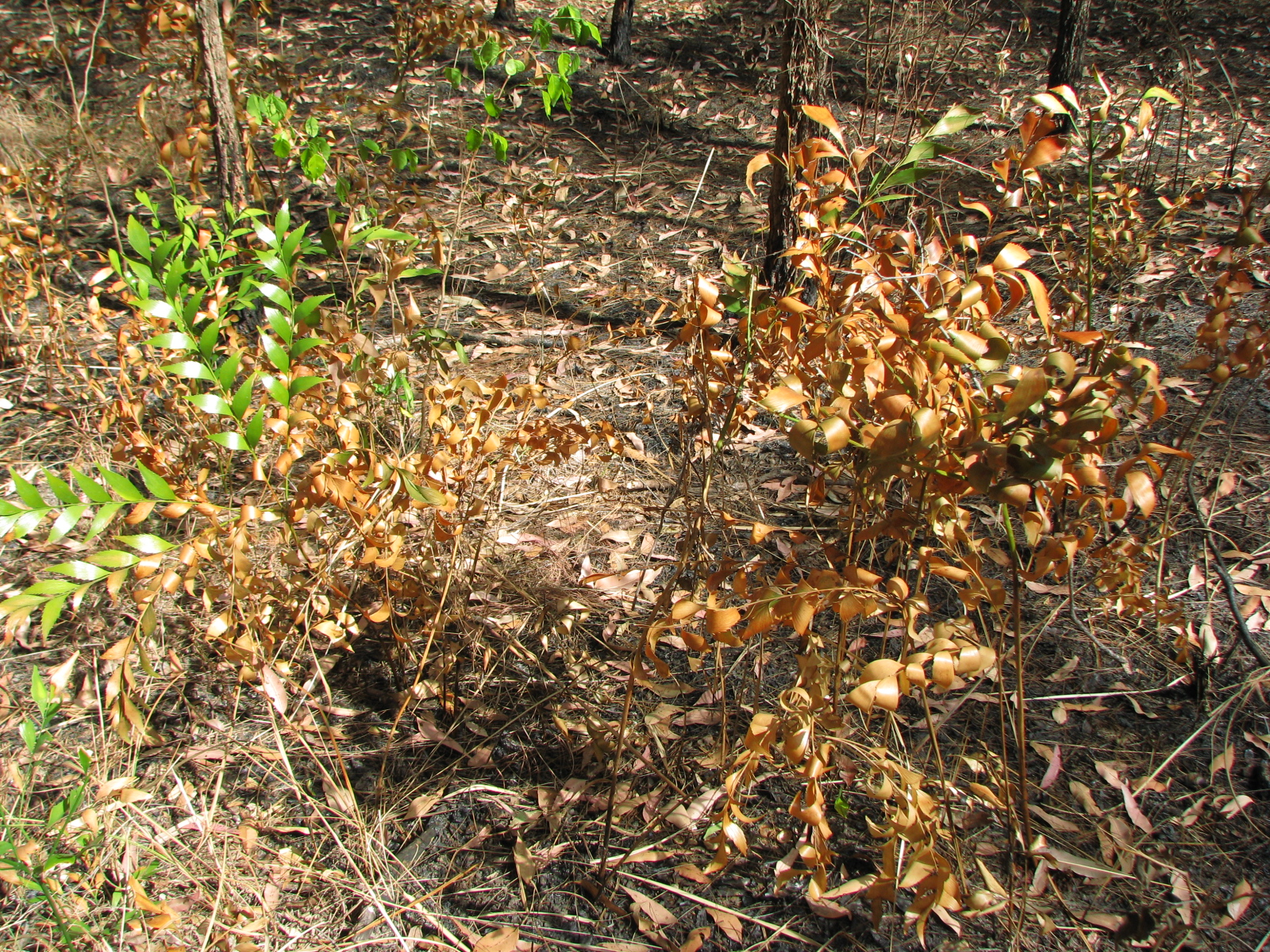
Bowenia Lake Tinaroo form in sclerophyll woodland after recent bushfire, near Lake Tinaroo, Atherton Tableland, far north Queensland

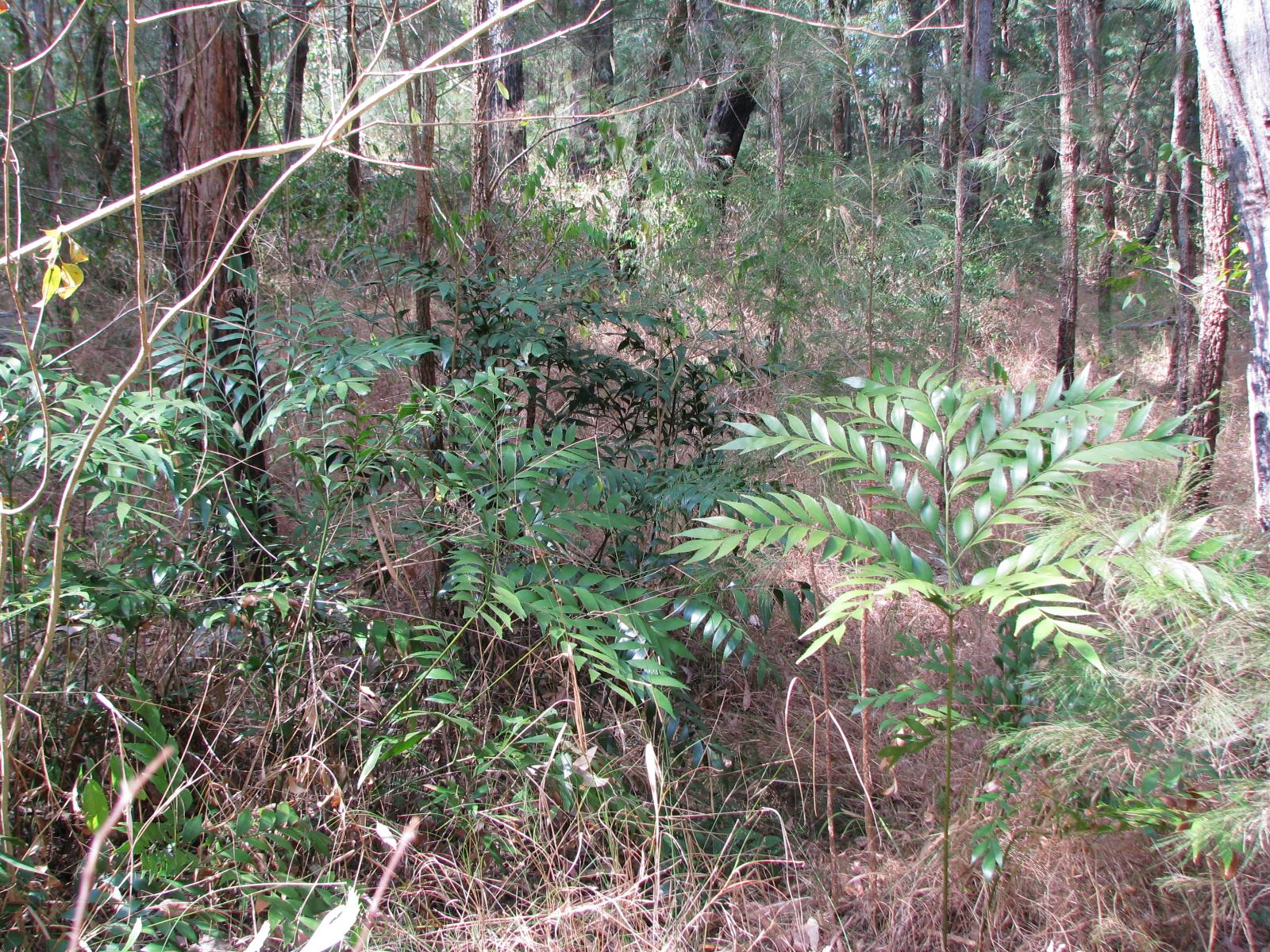
Bowenia Lake Tinaroo form in sclerophyll woodland near Lake Tinaroo, Atherton Tableland, far north Queensland
