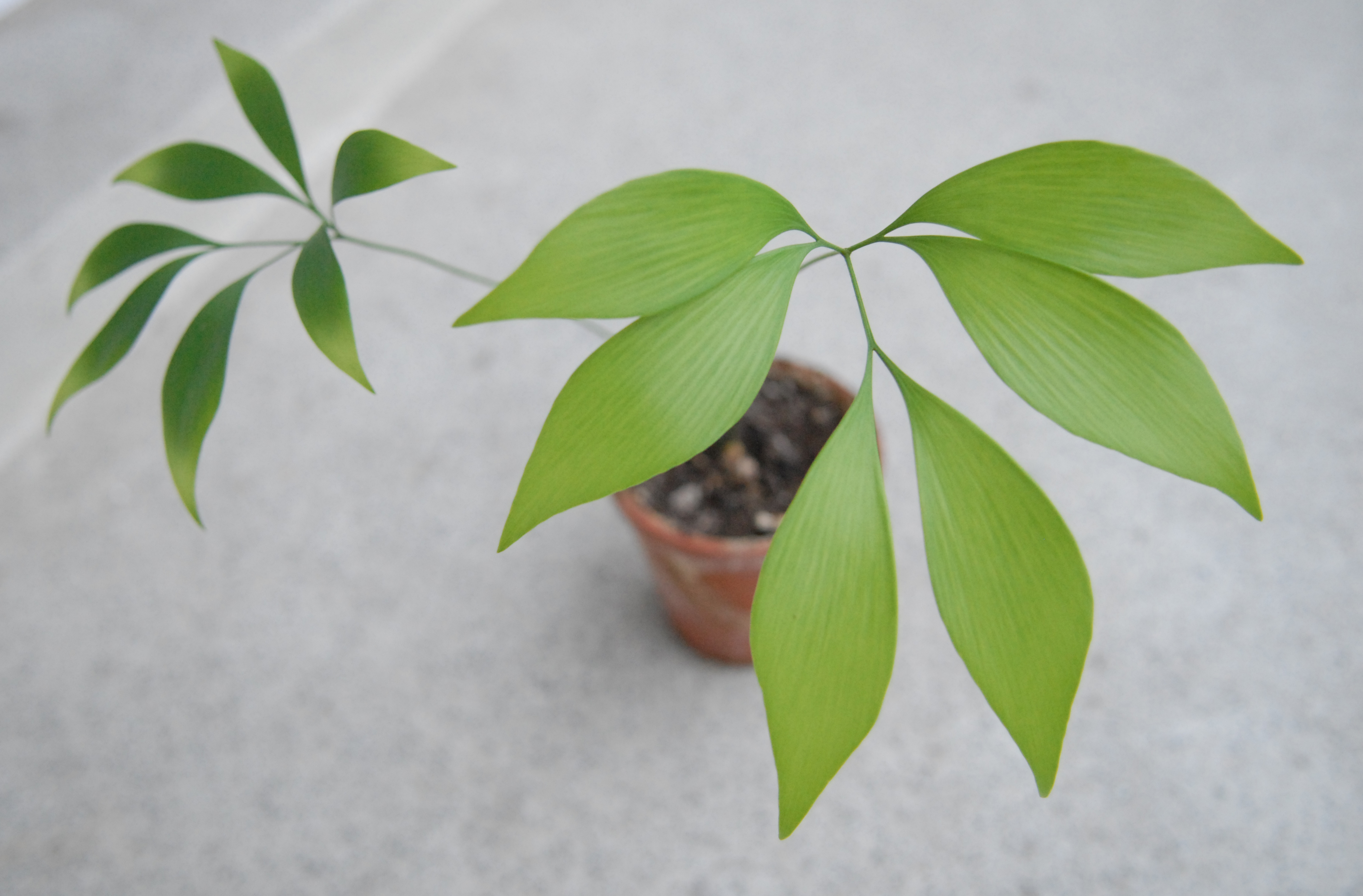

Scientific classification
- Kingdom: Plantae
- Clade: Embryophytes
- Clade: Tracheophytes
- Clade: Spermatophytes
- Clade: Gymnospermae
- Division: Cycadophyta
- Class: Cycadopsida
- Order: Cycadales
- Family: Zamiaceae
- Subfamily: Bowenioideae; Pilger
- Genus: Bowenia; Hook. ex Hook.f.

Type species
- Bowenia spectabilis Hook.f.

Species
- †B. eocenica Hill; †B. papillosa Hill; B. serrulata (Bull) Chamberlain; B. spectabilis Hooker
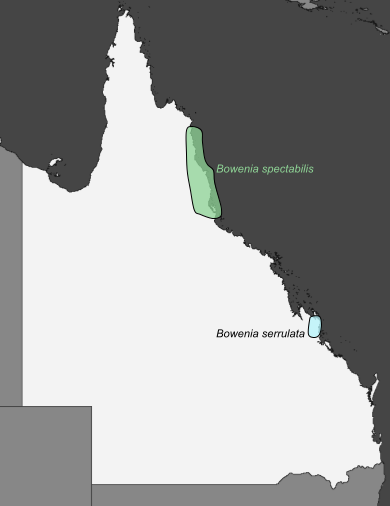

= Bowenia =

Genus of cycads native to Australia

The genus Bowenia includes two living and two fossil species of cycads in the family Stangeriaceae, sometimes placed in their own family Boweniaceae. They are entirely restricted to Australia.

== Description ==
The chromosome count is 2n = 18.

== Species ==
Image	Scientific name	Distribution
	Bowenia serrulata Chamb.	Queensland
	Bowenia spectabilis Hook	Queensland

== Distribution ==
The two living species occur in Queensland. B. spectabilis grows in warm, wet, tropical rainforests, on protected slopes and near streams, primarily in the lowlands of the Wet Tropics Bioregion. However, it has a local form with serrate pinna margins that grows in rainforest, Acacia-dominated transition forest, and also Casuarina-dominated sclerophyll forest on the Atherton Tableland, where it is subject to periodic bushfire. B. serrulata grows in sclerophyll forest and transition forest close to the Tropic of Capricorn.

== Fossils ==
The fossil species Bowenia eocenica is known from deposits in a coal mine in Victoria, Australia, and B. papillosa is known from deposits in New South Wales. Both fossils are of Eocene age, and consist of leaflet fragments.

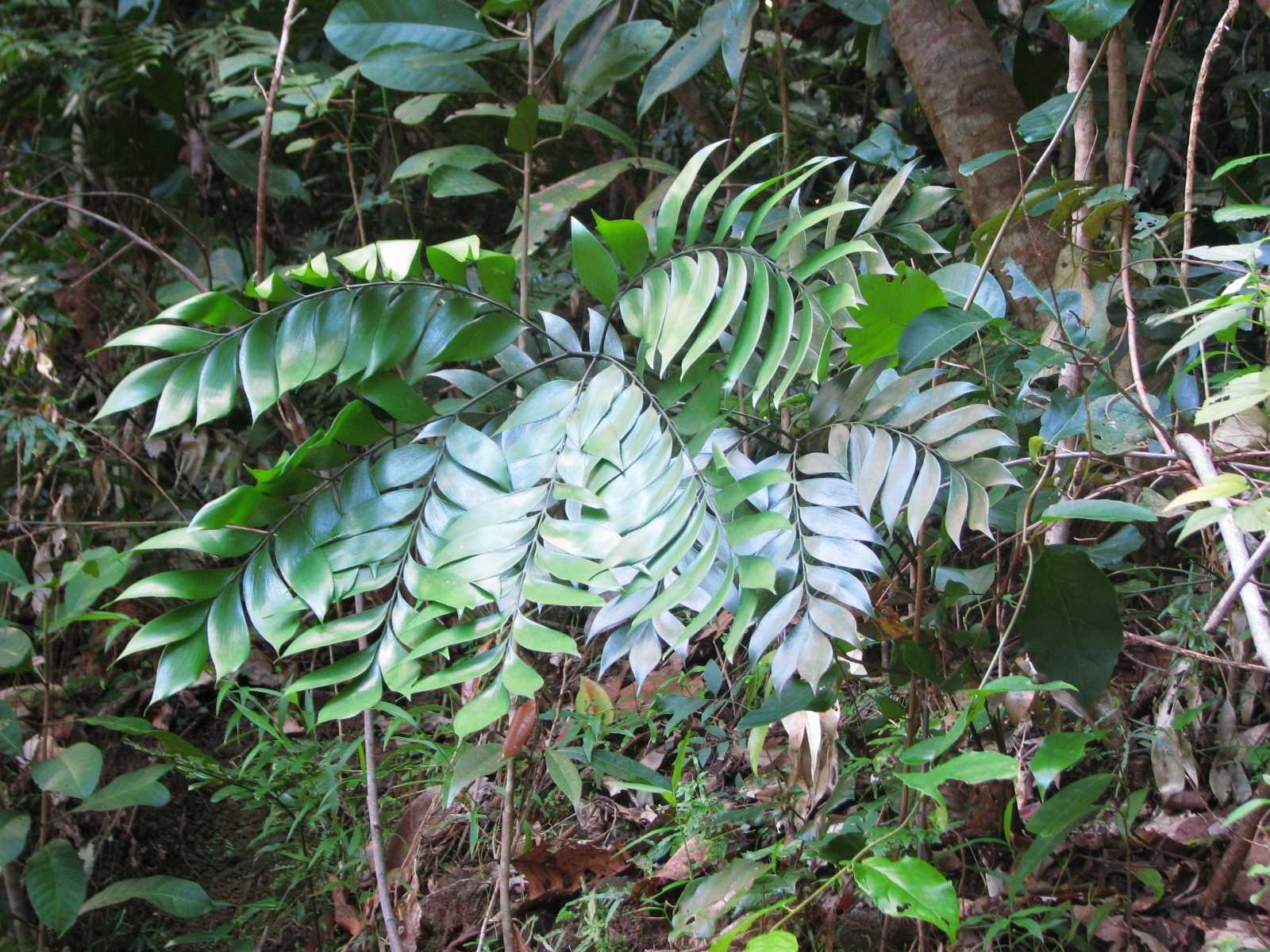
Bowenia spectabilis in the Daintree Rainforest in northeast Queensland, Australia

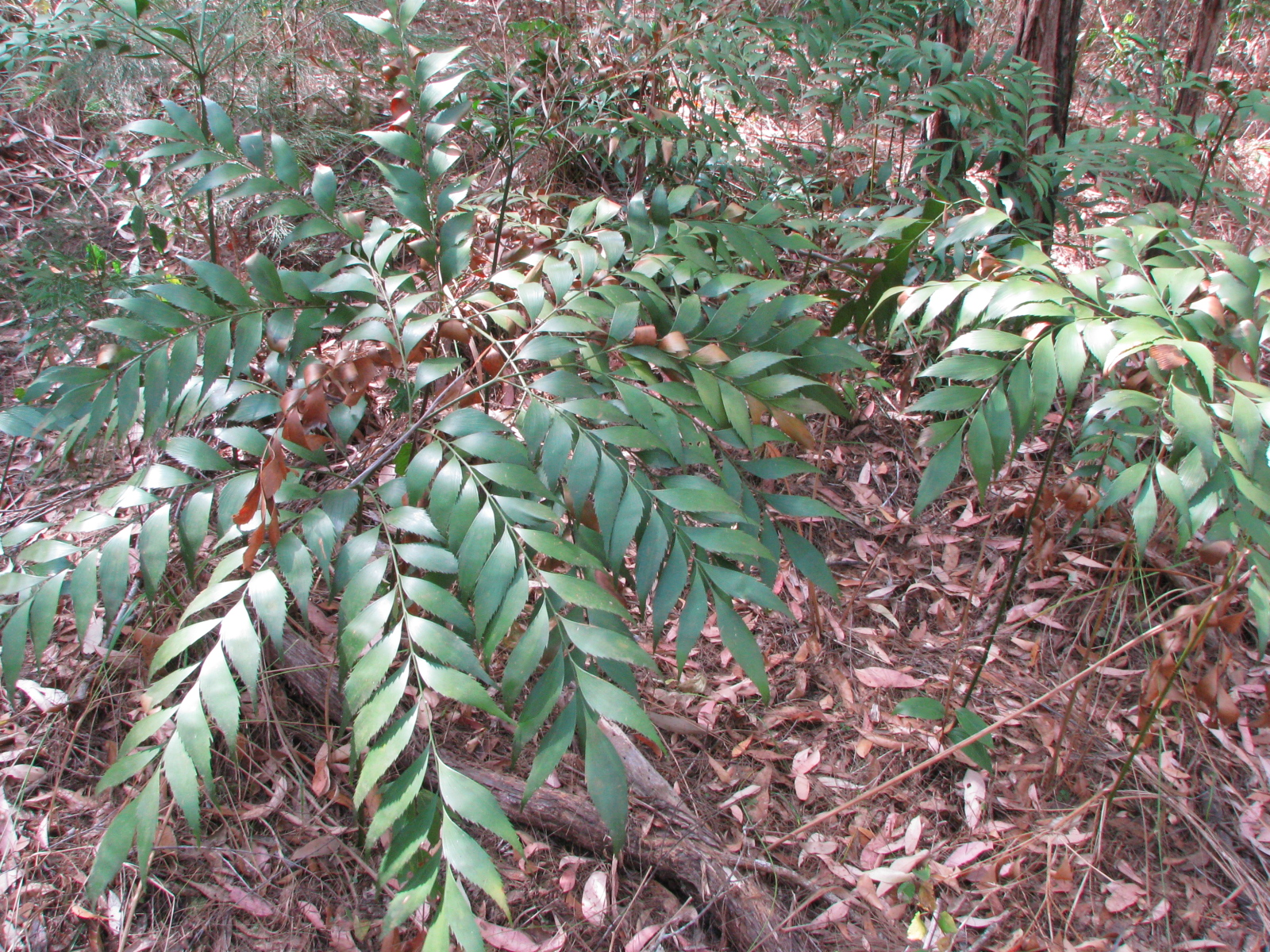
Bowenia Lake Tinaroo form in sclerophyll woodland near Lake Tinaroo, Atherton Tableland, far north Queensland

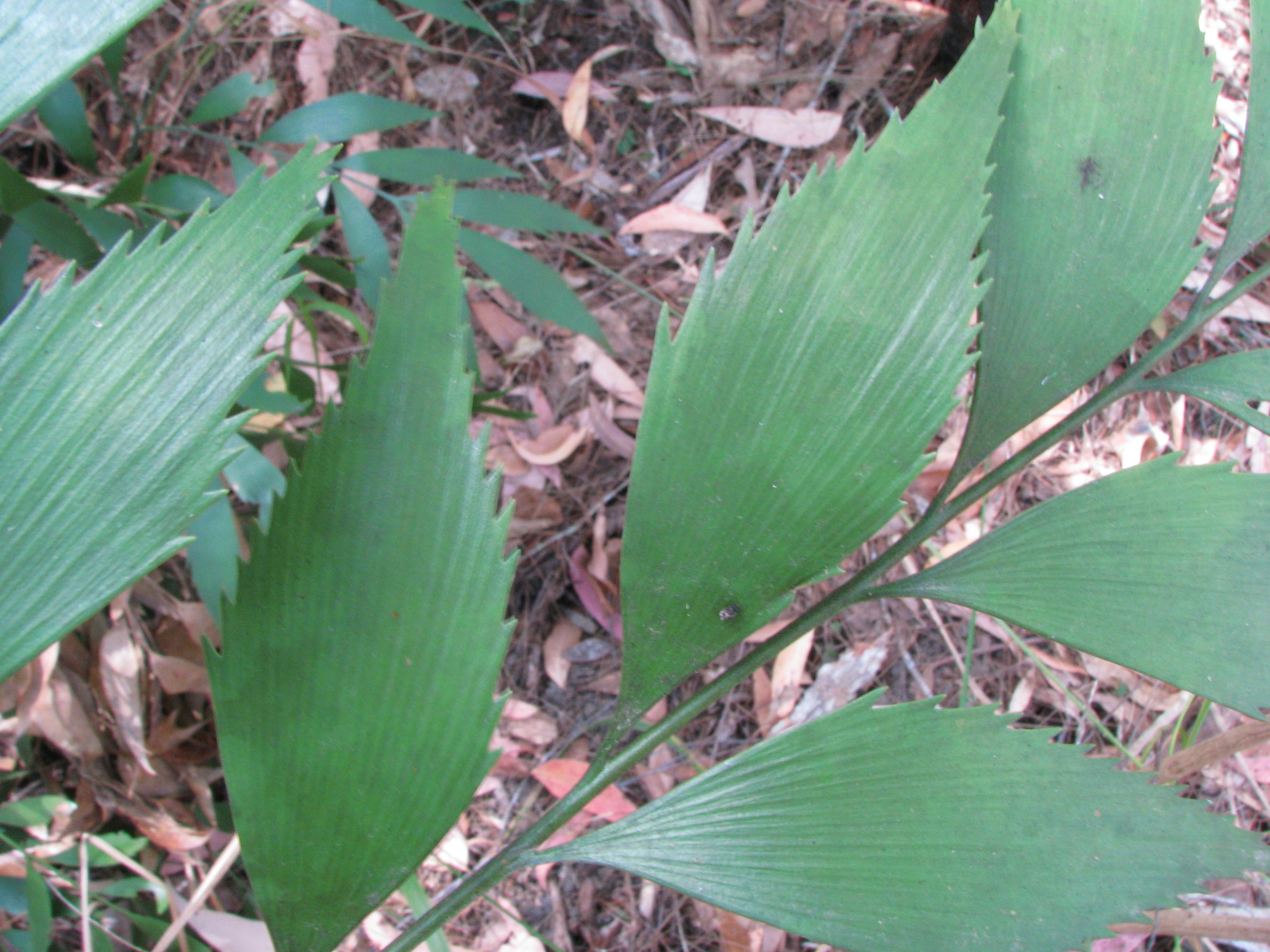
Serrulate margin of the pinnae on a wild plant of Bowenia Lake Tinaroo form, at Lake Tinaroo, Atherton Tableland, Queensland, Australia

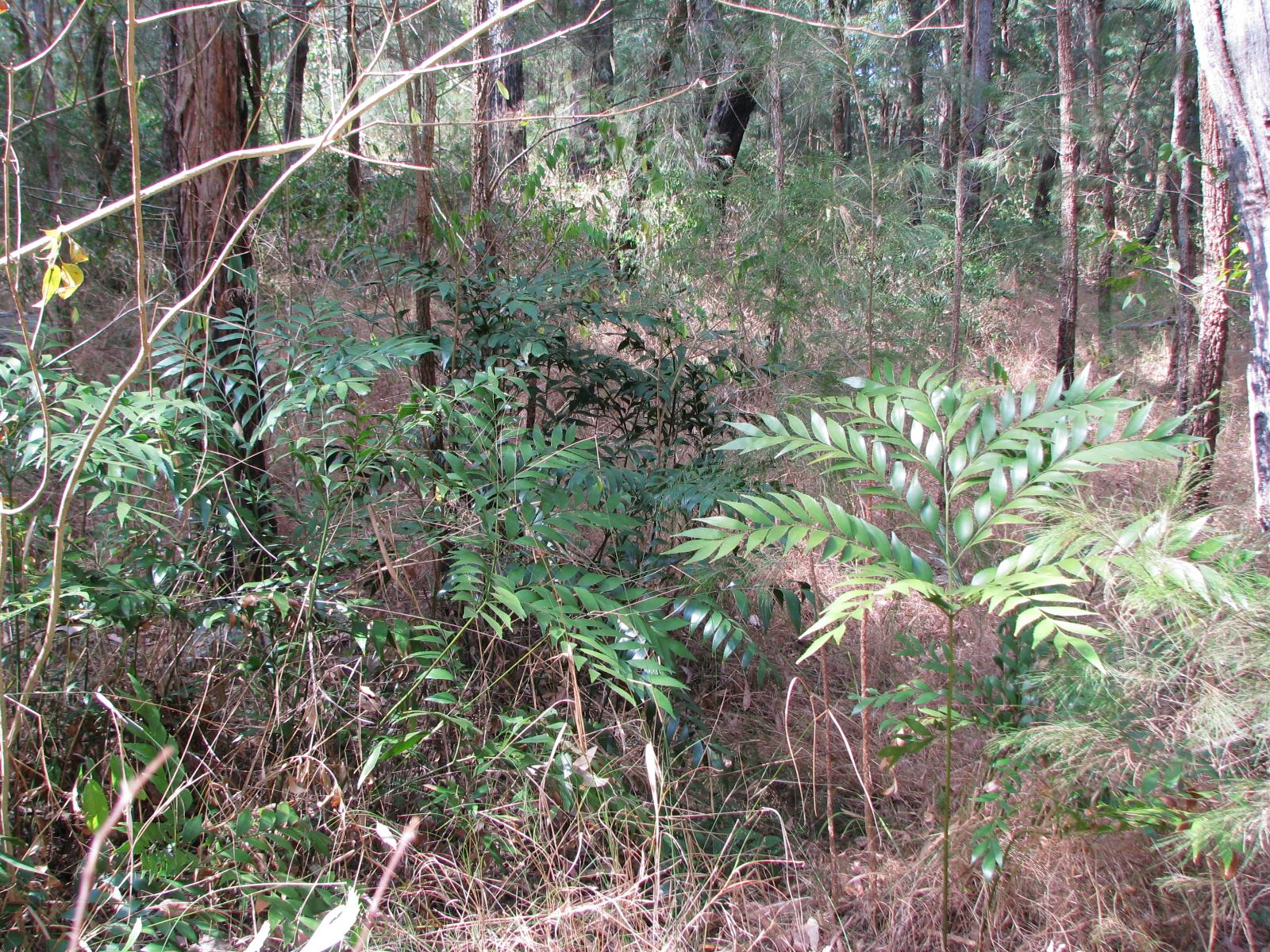
Bowenia Lake Tinaroo form in sclerophyll woodland near Lake Tinaroo, Atherton Tableland, far north Queensland

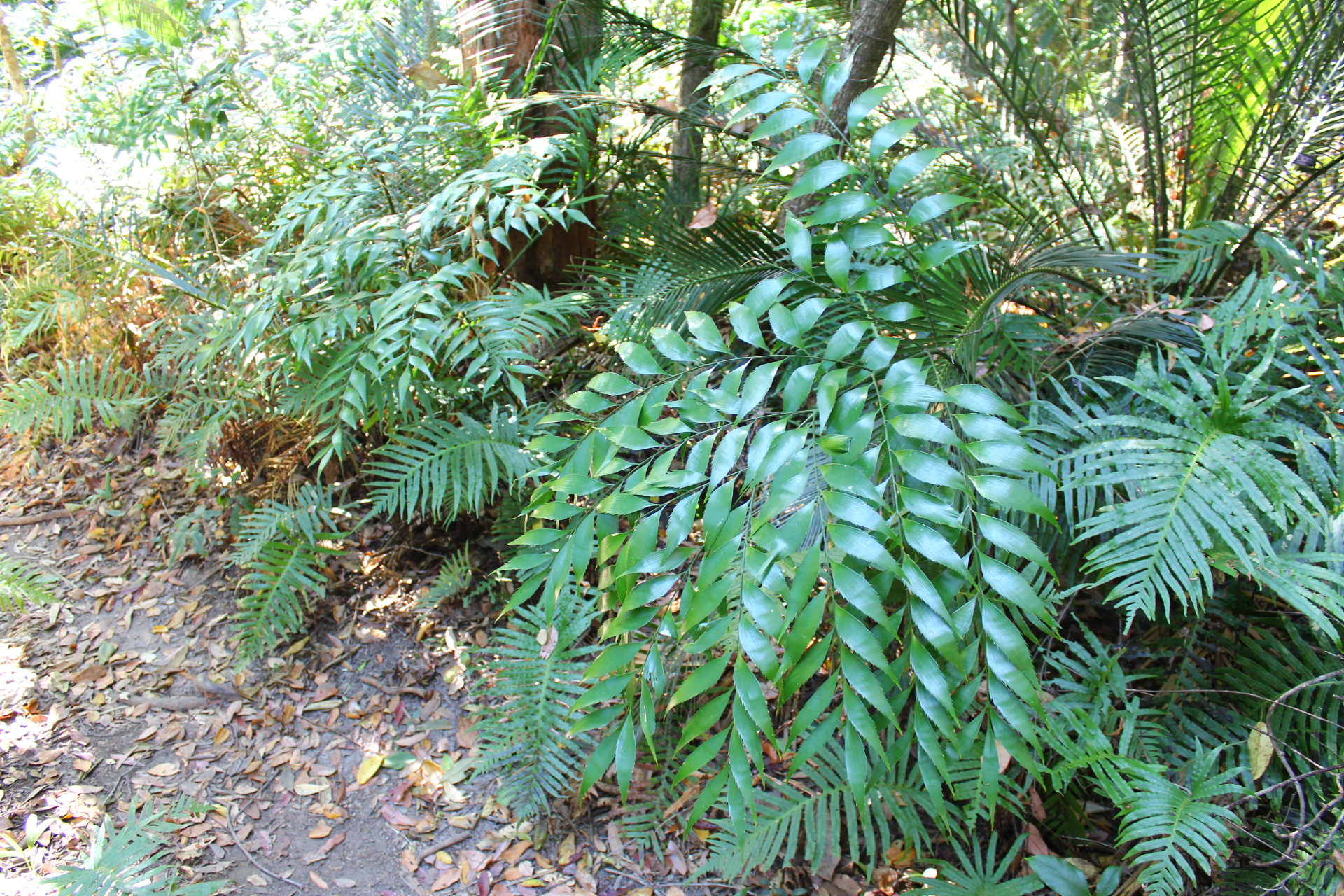
Bowenia serrulata growing in transition forest near Byfield, in the Capricornia region of Queensland, Australia
