= Mount Achernar =

Mountain in Ross Dependency, Antarctica

Mount Achernar (84°12′S 160°56′E) is a peak forming the northeast end of the MacAlpine Hills, on the south side of Law Glacier. Named by the New Zealand Geological Survey Antarctic Expedition (NZGSAE) (1961–62) after the star Achernar used in fixing the survey baseline.

== Late Permian buried forest ==
Mount Achernar consists of the deeply eroded and glacially sculptured beds of sandstone, siltstone, shale, and coal of the Buckley Formation of the Beacon Supergroup. Exposed by the slopes of this mountain is a well known and studied late Permian buried forest consisting of numerous in situ fossil tree stumps. These silicified stumps are up to 18 cm (7.1 in) and 20 cm (7.9 in) height and in growth position. The tree rings on these stumps are well-preserved and exhibit narrow zones of latewood that represent a young, rapidly growing forest at latitudes of about 80° to 85 °S. These trees are interpreted to represent a forest growing at the time that the climate was warm because of the wide growth rings, lack of frost rings, and the deciduous nature of Glossopteris.

== Go see ==
Gordon Valley buried forest
