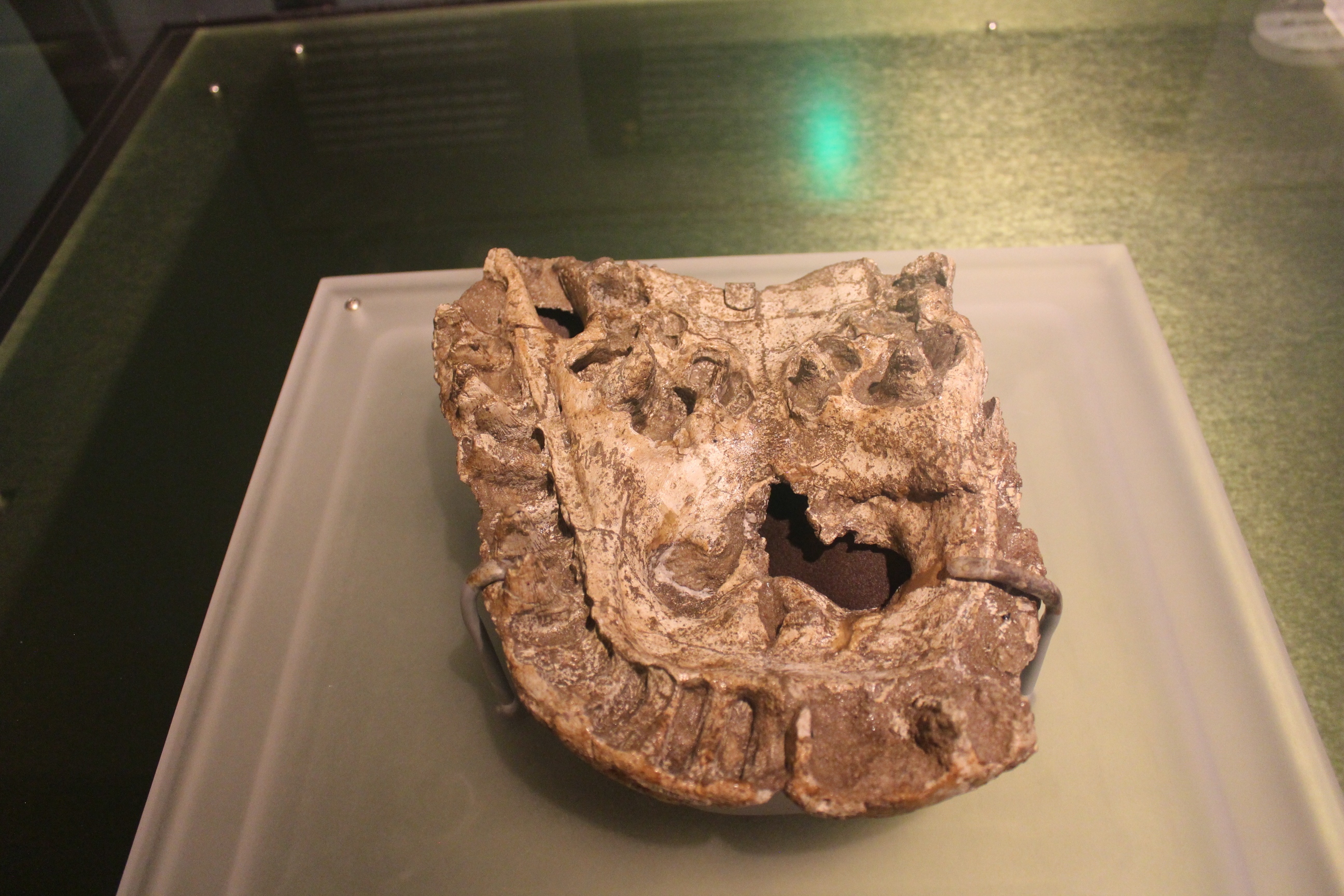
- Holotype skull on display at the Field Museum of Natural History.

Scientific classification
- Kingdom: Animalia
- Phylum: Chordata
- Clade: Tetrapoda
- Order: †Temnospondyli
- Suborder: †Stereospondyli
- Genus: †Kryostega; Sidor et al., 2008
- Species: †K. collinssoni

Binomial name
- †Kryostega collinssoni Sidor et al., 2008

= Kryostega =

Kryostega Temporal range: Triassic

Genus of amphibians

Kryostega is a large temnospondyl amphibian from the Early or Middle Triassic of Antarctica. The genus is based on a single specimen collected in 1986 by a team led by paleontologist William H. Hammer of Augustana College, and now housed in the collections of the American Museum of Natural History (AMNH 24419).

== Description ==
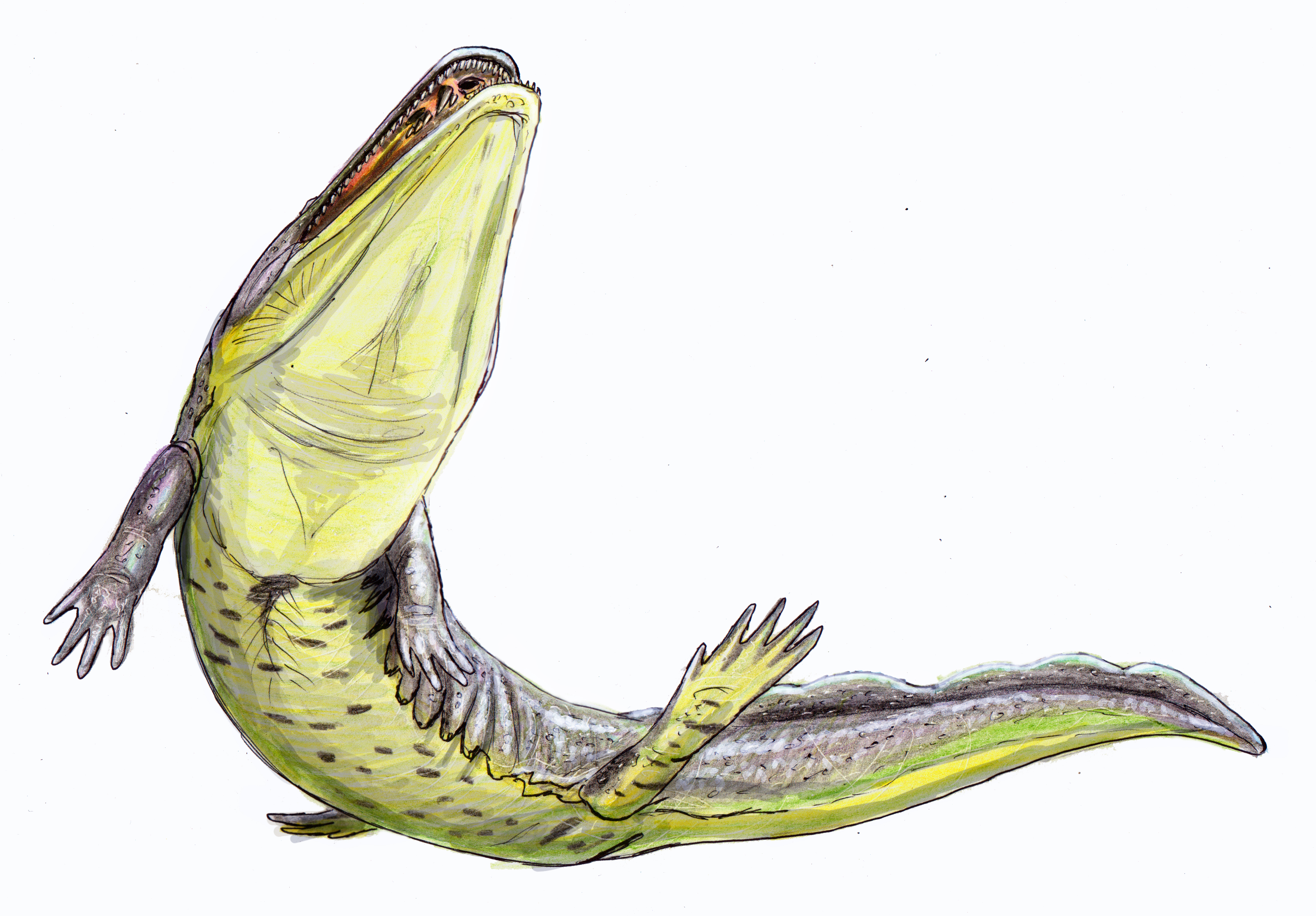
Restoration

The holotype consists of an incomplete snout, including portions of both the right and left premaxilla, a partial left maxilla, both lacrimals, a small portion of the left nasal, the vomer, and a fragment of the palatine. Many partial teeth are preserved, though most have been broken away at their bases. The preserved part of the skull measures 27 cm long and 21 cm wide, from which a total skull length on about one meter has been inferred (Sidor et al., 2008; p. 657). Total body length has been estimated at 4.57 meters. The specimen suffered some damage during excavation, and the ventral surface is better preserved than the dorsal side of the fossil. Presently, only a single species is recognized, K. colllinsoni, named in honor of Antarctic scientist Jim Collinson.

== Classification ==
Sidor et al. (2008; p. 659-660) conclude that Kryostega likely belongs to either the families Heylerosauridae or the basal Mastodonsauridae within the Stereospondyli, though they also consider an alternative phylogeny, the possibility that it may belong, instead, in the Trematosauroidea, and suggest that only additional and more complete specimens of the taxon will resolve the issue.

== Paleoecology ==
Kryostega was discovered in beds of the upper Fremouw Formation at Gordon Valley in the central Transantarctic Mountains. This portion of the Fremouw Formation consists largely of a 300-meter thick series of crossbedded, volcaniclastic sandstones. Kryostega was found in a thin siltstone cobble conglomerate within these strata, about 70 meters from the base of the upper member. The same bed has produced remains of Cynognathus, along with a kannemeyeriid dicynodont, a gomphodont cynodont, and a second species of large temnospondyl. Sidor et al. (2008; p. 661-662) conclude that the "...inferred high paleolatitude of Gordon Valley during deposition would have subjected it to long periods of continuous darkness during the winter months," and that the discovery of a large, semiaquatic amphibian in these beds is "...evidence for unsuspected ecological diversity with the Polar Circle during the Triassic."
