= Rhigerpeton =

Rhigerpeton Temporal range: Early Triassic

Scientific classification
- Kingdom: Animalia
- Phylum: Chordata
- Clade: Tetrapoda
- Order: †Temnospondyli
- Suborder: †Stereospondyli
- Family: †Lapillopsidae
- Genus: †Rhigerpeton
- Species: †R. isbelli

Binomial name
- †Rhigerpeton isbelli Gee et al., 2023

Extinct genus of temnospondyli

Rhigerpeton is an extinct genus of lapillopsid temnospondyl that lived in Antarctica during the Early Triassic. It contains a single species, R. isbelli.
