= Notictoides =

Notictoides Temporal range: Early Triassic

Scientific classification
- Kingdom: Animalia
- Phylum: Chordata
- Clade: Synapsida
- Clade: Therapsida
- Clade: †Therocephalia
- Clade: †Bauriamorpha
- Genus: †Notictoides; Sidor et al., 2021

Type species
- Notictoides absens Sidor et al., 2021

Extinct genus of synapsids

Notictoides is an extinct genus of therocephalian that was endemic to Antarctica during the Early Triassic epoch. It is a monotypic genus known from a single species, N. absens.
