= Graphite Peak =

Mountain in Ross Dependency, Antarctica

Graphite Peak (85°3′S 172°45′E) is a peak, 3,260 metres (10,700 ft) high, standing at the northeast end of a ridge running 3 nautical miles (6 km) northeast from Mount Clarke, just south of the head of Falkenhof Glacier in Antarctica. It was so named by the New Zealand Geological Survey Antarctic Expedition (1961–62) because of the graphite found on the peak.

== Paleontology ==
Fossiliferous sedimentary rocks containing the Permian–Triassic boundary outcrop on the slopes of Graphite Peak. These sedimentary strata contain well-preserved plant, invertebrate, and vertebrate fossils that are important in understanding paleoclimatic and paleontologic changes associated with the Permian–Triassic extinction event. Graphite Peak is the location where the first fossil of an Early Triassic tetrapod was discovered in Antarctica.

== See also ==
Coalsack Bluff
