= Gordon Valley =

Valley in Antarctica

Gordon Valley (84°23′S 164°0′E) is a small valley, the western half of which is occupied by a lobe of ice from Walcott Neve, lying west of Mount Falla in the Queen Alexandra Range, Antarctica. It was named by the Advisory Committee on Antarctic Names after Mark A. Gordon, a United States Antarctic Research Program aurora scientist at Hallett Station, 1959.

== Geology and Paleontology ==
The Gordon Valley exposes the middle and upper members of the Triassic Fremouw Formation of the Beacon Supergroup. They consist of discontinuous beds of volcaniclastic sandstone intercalated with siltstone and silty mudstone, In the Gordon Valley, the upper member of Fremouw Formation contains a widely published and well-studied Triassic buried forest that consists of about 99 silicifed tree stumps and compressed leaves associated with paleosols and ancient stacked fluvial palaeochannels deposited by low-sinuosity braided streams. In addition to the buried forest, the sedimentary strata exposed within the Gordon Valley have yielded numerous fossils of Triassic tetrapods, including Cynognathus sp., and the first fossilized vertebrate tracks found in Antarctica.

== Go see ==
Mount Achernar buried forest
