= List of therapsids =

This list of therapsids is an attempt to create a comprehensive listing of all genera that have ever been included in the Therapsida excluding mammals and purely vernacular terms. The list includes all commonly accepted genera, but also genera that are now considered invalid, doubtful (nomina dubia), or were not formally published (nomina nuda), as well as junior synonyms of more established names, and genera that are no longer considered therapsids.

The list currently contains 510 generic names.

== Naming conventions and terminology ==
Naming conventions and terminology follow the International Code of Zoological Nomenclature. Technical terms used include:

- Junior synonym: A name which describes the same taxon as a previously published name. If two or more genera are formally designated and the type specimens are later assigned to the same genus, the first to be published (in chronological order) is the senior synonym, and all other instances are junior synonyms. Senior synonyms are generally used, except by special decision of the ICZN, but junior synonyms cannot be used again, even if deprecated. Junior synonymy is often subjective, unless the genera described were both based on the same type specimen.
- Nomen nudum (Latin for "naked name"): A name that has appeared in print but has not yet been formally published by the standards of the ICZN. Nomina nuda (the plural form) are invalid, and are therefore not italicized as a proper generic name would be. If the name is later formally published, that name is no longer a nomen nudum and will be italicized on this list. Often, the formally published name will differ from any nomina nuda that describe the same specimen.
- Nomen oblitum (Latin for "forgotten name"): A name that has not been used in the scientific community for more than fifty years after its original proposal.
- Preoccupied name: A name that is formally published, but which has already been used for another taxon. This second use is invalid (as are all subsequent uses) and the name must be replaced. As preoccupied names are not valid generic names, they will also go unitalicized on this list.
- Nomen dubium (Latin for "dubious name"): A name describing a fossil with no unique diagnostic features. As this can be an extremely subjective and controversial designation, this term is not used on this list.

== The list ==
| Genus | Authors | Year | Status | Age | Location | Notes |
|---|---|---|---|---|---|---|
| Admetophoneus | Efremov | 1954 | Valid. | Upper Permian | Russia | |
| Aelurognathus | Haughton | 1924 | Valid. | | | |
| Aelurosauroides | Broom | 1940 | Syn. | N/A | N/A | Synonym of Aelurosaurus |
| Aelurosauropsis | Broom | 1940 | Syn. | N/A | N/A | Synonym of Aelurosaurus |
| Aelurosaurus | Owen | 1881 | Valid. | | | |
| Agnosaurus | Boonstra | 1952 | Syn. | N/A | N/A | Synonym of Moschops |
| Akidnognathus | Haughton | 1918 | Valid. | | | |
| Alopecodon | Broom | 1908 | Valid. | Middle Permian | South Africa | |
| Alopecognathus | Broom | 1915 | Valid. | | | |
| Alopecopsis | Broom | 1920 | Syn. | N/A | N/A | Synonym of Theriognathus |
| Alopecorhinus | Broom | 1912 | Valid. | | | |
| Aloposauroides | Brink; Kitching | 1953 | Syn. | N/A | N/A | Synonym of Aloposaurus |
| Aloposaurus | Broom | 1910 | Valid. | | | |
| Andescynodon | Bonaparte | 1969 | Valid. | | | |
| Aneugomphius | Broom; Robinson | 1949 | Syn. | N/A | N/A | Synonym of Theriognathus |
| Angonisaurus | Cox | 1983 | Valid.? | Middle Triassic | Tanzania | May be synonym of Shansiodon |
| Annatherapsidus | Kuhn | 1961 | Valid. | Upper Permian | Russia | |
| Anningia | Broom | 1927 | Nomen vanum | Permian | South Africa | Declared to be a nomen vanum after a restudy of the type specimen. |
| Anomocephalus | Modesto; Rubidge; Welman | 1999 | Valid. | Upper Permian | South Africa | |
| Anomodon | Keyser | 1975 | Valid. | | | |
| Anoplosuchus | Tchudinov | 1968 | Valid. | Upper Permian | Russia | |
| Antecosuchus | Tatarinov | 1973 | Valid. | Middle Triassic | Russia | |
| Anteosaurus | Watson | 1921 | Valid. | Upper Permian | South Africa | |
| Archaeosuchus | Broom | 1905 | Valid. | | | |
| Archaeosyodon | Tchudinov | 1960 | Valid. | Upper Permian | Russia | |
| Arctognathoides | Boonstra | 1934 | Valid. | | | |
| Arctognathus | Broom | 1911 | Valid. | | | |
| Arctops | Watson | 1914 | Valid. | | | |
| Arctosuchus | Broom | 1911 | Valid. | | | |
| Arctotraversodon | Sues; Hopson; Shubin | 1992 | Valid. | | | |
| Arnognathus | Broom | 1907 | Valid. | | | |
| Aulacocephalodon | Seeley | 1898 | Valid. | N/A | N/A | Synonym of Aulacephalodon |
| Aulacephalodon | Seeley | 1898 | Valid. | Middle-Upper Permian | South Africa | |
| Australosyodon | Rubidge | 1994 | Valid. | Middle-Upper Permian | South Africa | |
| Avenantia | Boonstra | 1952 | Valid. | | | |
| Barysoma | Cox | 1965 | Valid. | | | |
| Bauria | Broom | 1909 | Valid. | Early to Mid-Triassic | | |
| Baurioides | Broom | 1925 | Syn. | N/A | N/A | Synonym of Bauria |
| Bayloria | Oldon | 1941 | Syn. | Lower Permian | United States of America | Immature specimen of the captorhinid reptile Captorhinus aguti |
| Beishanodon | Gao; Fox; Zhou; Li | 2010 | Valid. | Lower Triassic | China | |
| Belesodon | von Huene | 1936 | Syn. | N/A | N/A | Different growth stage of the genus Chiniquodon |
| Biarmosaurus | Tchudinov | 1960 | Syn. | N/A | N/A | Synonym of Biarmosuchus |
| Biarmosuchoides | Tverdokhlebova; Ivakhnenko | 1994 | Valid. | Upper Permian | Russia | |
| Biarmosuchus | Tchudinov | 1960 | Valid. | Upper Permian | Russia | |
| Bienotherium | Young | 1940 | Valid. | Lower Jurassic | China | |
| Bienotheroides | Young | 1982 | Valid. | Middle-Late Jurassic | China and Mongolia | |
| Biseridens | Li; Cheng | 1997 | Valid. | Upper Permian | China | |
| Bolotridon | Coad | 1977 | Valid. | Mid-Triassic | | |
| Boreogomphodon | Sues; Olsen | 1990 | Valid. | Late Triassic | United States of America | |
| Brachyprosopus | Olson | 1937 | Valid. | Mid-Permian | | |
| Brachyuraniscus | Broili; Schroeder | 1935 | Valid. | Middle Permian | South Africa | |
| Brasilitherium | Bonaparte; Martinelli; Schultz; Rubert | 2003 | Valid. | Late Triassic | Brazil | |
| Brasilodon | Bonaparte; Martinelli; Schultz; Rupert | 2003 | Valid. | Late Triassic | Brazil | |
| Brithopus | Kutorga | 1838 | Valid. | Middle Permian | Russia | |
| Broilius | Toerien | 1953 | Valid. | | | |
| Broomicephalus | Brink; Kitching | 1953 | Valid. | | | |
| Broomisaurus | Joleaud | 1920 | Valid. | Permian | | |
| Broomosuchus | Camp; Taylor; Welles | 1942 | Syn. | N/A | N/A | Synonym of Anteosaurus |
| Bullacephalus | Rubidge; Kitching | 2003 | Valid. | Late Permian | | |
| Burnetia | Broom | 1923 | Valid. | Upper Permian | South Africa | |
| Calleonasus | Kalandadze | 1985 | Valid. | Middle Triassic | Russia | |
| Cephalicustroidus | Parrington | 1974 | Valid. | | | |
| Cerataelurus | Broom | 1931 | Valid. | | | |
| Cerdodon | Broom | 1915 | Valid. | | | |
| Cerdorhinus | Broom | 1936 | Valid. | | | |
| Chalepotherium | Simpson | 1928 | Syn. | N/A | N/A | Synonym of Oligokyptus |
| Chaliminia | Bonaparte | 1980 | Valid. | Upper Triassic | Brazil | |
| Chanaria | Cox | 1968 | Valid. | | | |
| Charassognathus | Botha; Abdala; Smith | 2007 | Valid. | | | |
| Charruodon | Abdala; Ribeiro | 2000 | Valid. | Late Triassic | Brazil | |
| Chelydontops | Cluver | 1975 | Valid. | | | |
| Chiniquodon | von Huene | 1936 | Valid. | Middle-Upper Triassic | Argentina and Brazil | |
| Chiwetasaurus | Haughton | 1926 | Syn. | N/A | N/A | Synonym of Gorgonops |
| Chthomaloporus | Tchudinov | 1964 | Valid. | Upper Permian | Russia | |
| Chthonosaurus | Vjuschkov | 1955 | Valid. | Upper Permian | Russia | |
| Cistecephaloides | Cluver | 1974 | Valid. | | | |
| Cistecephalus | Owen | 1876 | Valid. | Middle-Upper Permian | South Africa, Zambia and India | |
| Clelandina | Broom | 1948 | Valid. | | | |
| Colobodectes | Modesto; Rubidge; Visser; Welman | 2003 | Valid. | | | |
| Compsodon | van Hoepen | 1934 | Valid. | | | |
| Crapartinella | Mendrez | 1975 | Valid. | | | |
| Cragievanus | Brink | 1965 | Syn. | N/A | N/A | Synonym of Diademodon |
| Criocephalosaurus | Kammerer; Sidor | 2002 | Valid. | Middle Permian | Zimbabwe | |
| Cristonasus | Surkov | 1999 | Valid. | Middle Triassic | Russia | |
| Cromptodon | Bonaparte | 1972 | Valid. | | | |
| Cryptocynodon | Seeley | 1895 | Valid. | | | |
| Cteniosaurus | Broom | 1935 | Valid. | | | |
| Cynochampsa | Owen | 1859 | Syn. | N/A | N/A | Synonym of Diademodon |
| Cynognathus | Seeley | 1895 | Valid. | Lower-Middle Triassic | South Africa and Argentina | |
| Cyonosaurus | Olsen | 1937 | Valid. | Upper Permian | South Africa | |
| Cynosaurus | Schmidt | 1927 | Valid. | | | |
| Dadadon | Flynn; Parrish; Rakotosamimanana; Ranivoharimanana; Wyss | 2000 | Valid. | Middle-Late Triassic | Madagascar | |
| Daptocephalus | van Hoepen | 1934 | Valid | Late Permian | South Africa | |
| Daqingshanodon | Zhu | 1989 | Syn. | N/A | N/A | Synonym of Dicynodon |
| Deccanodon | Nath; Yadagiri | 2007 | Valid. | Upper Triassic | India | |
| Delphaciognathus | Broom | 1932 | Valid. | | | |
| Delphinognathus | Seeley | 1892 | Valid. | | | |
| Deuterosaurus | Eichwald | 1860 | Valid. | Upper Permian | Russia | |
| Diademodon | Seeley | 1895 | Valid. | Lower-Middle Triassic | South Africa | |
| Diaelurodon | Broom | 1911 | Valid. | | | |
| Dianzhongia | Cui | 1981 | Valid. | Lower Jurassic | China | |
| Dicynodon | Owen | 1845 | Valid. | Upper Permian | Gondwana and Lausaria | |
| Dicynodontoides | Broom | 1940 | Valid. | Upper Permian | South Africa | |
| Digalodon | Broom; Robinson | 1948 | Valid. | Upper Permian | South Africa | Probably valid taxon; needs further investigation |
| Diictodon | Broom | 1913 | Valid. | Upper Permian | China and South Africa | |
| Dinanomodon | Broom | 1938 | Valid | Late Permian | South Africa | |
| Dinodontosaurus | Romer | 1943 | Valid. | Middle Triassic | Brazil | |
| Dinogorgon | Broom | 1936 | Valid. | | | |
| Dinophoneus | Broom | 1923 | Syn. | N/A | N/A | Synonym of Jonkeria |
| Dinosaurus | Fischer | 1847 | Valid. | | | |
| Dinosuchus | Broom | 1936 | Syn. | N/A | N/A | Synonym of Anteosaurus |
| Dixeya | Haughton | 1926 | Syn. | N/A | N/A | Synonym of Aelurognathus |
| Dolichuranus | Keyser | 1973 | Valid.? | Middle Triassic | Zambia | May be synonym of Shansiodon |
| Doliosauriscus | Kuhn | 1961 | Valid. | Upper Permian | Russia | Replacement name for Doliosaurus Orlov, 1958 |
| Doliosaurus | Orlov | 1958 | Preocc. | N/A | N/A | Preoccupied by lizard Doliosaurus Girard, 1858 (Sauria: Iguania) |
| Dongusaurus | Vjuschkov | 1964 | Valid. | Middle Triassic | Russia | |
| Dragocephalus | Brink; Kitching | 1953 | Syn. | N/A | N/A | Synonym of Clelandina |
| Driveria | Olson | 1962 | Valid. | Lower Permian | United States of America | |
| Dvinia | Amalitskii | 1922 | Valid. | Upper Permian | Russia | |
| Ecteninion | Martinez; May; Forster | 1996 | Valid. | Upper Triassic | Argentina | |
| Edaxosaurus | Kalandadze | 1985 | Valid. | Middle Triassic | Russia | |
| Elatosaurus | Kalandadze | 1985 | Valid. | Middle Triassic | Russia | |
| Elephantosaurus | Vjuschkov | 1969 | Valid. | Middle Triassic | Russia | |
| Elliotherium | Sidor; Hancox | 2006 | Valid. | Upper Triassic | South Africa | |
| Emydochampsa | Broom | 1912 | Syn. | N/A | N/A | Synonym of Endothiodon |
| Emydops | Broom | 1912 | Valid. | Middle Permian | South Africa and India | |
| Emydopsoides | van Hoepen | 1934 | Valid. | | | |
| Emydorhynchus | Broom | 1935 | Valid. | | | |
| Emydorhinus | Broom | 1935 | Valid. | | | |
| Emyduranus | Broom | 1921 | Valid. | | | |
| Endogomphodon | Broom | 1932 | Syn. | N/A | N/A | Synonym of Endothiodon |
| Endothiodon | Owen | 1876 | Valid. | Upper Permian | South Africa, Tanzania, Malawi and India | |
| Eoarctops | Haughton | 1929 | Valid. | | | |
| Eocyclops | Broom | 1913 | Syn. | N/A | N/A | Synonym of Rhachiocephalus |
| Eodicynodon | Barry | 1974 | Valid. | Middle-Upper Permian | South Africa | |
| Eosimops | Broom | 1922 | Valid. | | | |
| Eosyodon | Olson | 1962 | Valid. | Upper Permian | United States of America | |
| Eotitanosuchus | Tchudinov | 1960 | Valid. | Upper Permian | Russia | |
| Ericiolacerta | Watson | 1931 | Valid. | Early Triassic | South Africa | |
| Eriphostoma | Broom | 1911 | Valid. | | | |
| Esoterodon | Seeley | 1895 | Syn. | N/A | N/A | Synonym of Endothiodon |
| Estemmenosuchus | Tchudinov | 1960 | Valid. | Upper Permian | Russia | |
| Euchambersia | Broom | 1931 | Valid. | | | |
| Eumantellia | Broom | 1935 | Valid. | | | |
| Eurosaurus | Eichwald | 1860 | Valid. | | | |
| Eurychororhinus | Broili; Schroeder | 1935 | Valid. | | | |
| Exaeretodon | Cabrera | 1943 | Valid. | Upper Triassic | Brazil and Argentina | |
| Galechirus | Broom | 1907 | Valid. | Upper Permian | South Africa | |
| Galeops | Broom | 1912 | Valid. | Upper Permian | South Africa | |
| Galepus | Broom | 1910 | Valid. | Upper Permian | South Africa | |
| Galerhynchus | Broom | 1936 | Syn. | N/A | N/A | Synonym of Cerdorhinus |
| Galesaurus | Owen | 1859 | Valid. | | | |
| Galesuchus | Haughton | 1915 | Valid. | | | |
| Geikia | Newton | 1892 | Valid. | | | |
| Glanosuchus | Broom | 1904 | Valid. | Middle Permian | South Africa | |
| Glochinodontoides | Haughton | 1924 | Valid. | | | |
| Gomphodontosuchus | von Huene | 1928 | Valid. | Middle Triassic | Brazil | |
| Gomphognathus | Seeley | 1895 | Syn. | N/A | N/A | Synonym of Diademodon |
| Gorgodon | Olson | 1962 | Valid. | Lower Permian | United States of America | |
| Gordonia | Newton | 1893 | Valid. | | | |
| Gorgonocephalus | author author | 19xx | Preocc. | | | Preoccupied by echinoderm Gorgonocephalus Leach, 1815 |
| Gorgonops | Owen | 1876 | Valid. | Middle Permian | South Africa | |
| Habayia | Godefroit | 1999 | Valid. | Upper Triassic | Belgium | |
| Haughtoniana | Boonstra | 1938 | Valid. | | | |
| Hazhenia | Sun; Hou | 1981 | Valid. | Lower Triassic | China | |
| Herpetoskylax | Sidor; Rubidge | 2006 | Valid. | | | |
| Heuneus | Toerien | 1953 | Valid. | | | |
| Hexacynodon | Tatarinov | 1976 | Valid. | Upper Permian | Russia | |
| Hipposauroides | Boonstra | 1952 | Valid. | | | |
| Hipposaurus | Haughton | 1929 | Valid. | Middle Permian | South Africa | |
| Hofmeyria | Broom | 1935 | Valid. | | | |
| Homodontosaurus | Broom | 1949 | Valid. | | | |
| Hyenosaurus | Broom | 1935 | Syn. | N/A | N/A | Synonym of Theriognathus |
| Ianthodon | Kissel; Reisz | 2004 | Valid. | | | |
| Ictidognathus | Broom | 1911 | Syn. | N/A | N/A | Synonym of Ictidostoma |
| Ictidopsis | Broom | 1912 | Syn. | N/A | N/A | Synonym of Thrinaxodon |
| Ictidorhinus | Broom | 1913 | Valid. | Upper Permian | South Africa | |
| Ictidostoma | Broom | 1931 | Valid. | | | |
| Ictidosuchoides | Broom | 1931 | Valid. | Upper Permian - Lower Triassic | South Africa | |
| Ictidosuchops | Broom | 1938 | Valid. | | | |
| Ictidosuchus | Broom | 1910 | Valid. | | | |
| Idelesaurus | Kurkin | 2006 | Valid. | Upper Permian | Russia | |
| Inostrancevia | Amalitskii | 1922 | Valid. | Upper Permian | Russia | |
| Irajatherium | Martinelli; Bonaparte; Schultz; Rubert | 2005 | Valid. | Upper Triassic | Brazil | |
| Ischignathus | Bonaparte | 1963 | Syn. | N/A | N/A | Junior synonym of Exaeretodon |
| Ischigualastia | Cox | 1962 | Valid. | Upper Triassic | Argentina | |
| Ivantosaurus | Tchudinov | 1983 | Valid. | Upper Permian | Russia | |
| Jachaleria | Bonaparte | 1971 | Valid. | Upper Triassic | Argentina and Brazil | |
| Jimusaria | Sun | 1963 | Syn. | N/A | N/A | Synonym of Dicynodon |
| Jonkeria | van Hoepen | 1916 | Valid. | | | |
| Kannemeyeria | Seeley | 1908 | Valid. | Lower Triassic | China, Namibia, South Africa, Tanzania, Zambia, Argentina | If Rechnisaurus and Uralokannemeyeria are considered synonyms, the range also include Russia and India |
| Kawingasaurus | Cox | 1972 | Valid. | Middle Permian | Tanzania | |
| Kayentatherium | Kermack | 1982 | Valid. | Lower Jurassic | United States of America | |
| Keratocephalus | von Huene | 1931 | Valid. | | | |
| Kingoria | Cox | 1959 | Syn. | N/A | N/A | Junior synonym of Dicynodontoides Broom, 1940 |
| Kitchingia | Broom; George | 1950 | Syn. | N/A | N/A | Synonym of Rhachiocephalus |
| Knoxosaurus | Olson | 1962 | Valid. | Lower Permian | United States of America | |
| Kombuisia | Hotton | 1974 | Valid. | Upper Permian - Lower Triassic | South Africa | |
| Koupia | Boonstra | 1948 | Valid. | | | |
| Kunminia | Young | 1947 | Nomen dubium | Lower Jurassic | China | Possible synonym of Morganucodon |
| Kunpania | Sun | 1973 | Syn. | N/A | N/A | Synonym of Dicynodon |
| Kwazulusaurus | Maisch | 2002 | Valid. | Upper Permian | South Africa | |
| Lamiasaurus | Watson | 1914 | Valid. | | | |
| Lanthanocephalus | Modesto; Rubidge; Welman | 2002 | Preocc. | N/A | N/A | Preoccupied by cnidarian Lanthanocephalus Williams & Starmer, 2000 |
| Lanthanostegus | Modesto; Rubidge; Welman | 2003 | Valid. | Upper Permian | South Africa | Replacement name by Lanthanocephalus Modesto, Rubidge & Welman, 2002 |
| Lemurosaurus | Broom | 1949 | Valid. | Upper Permian | South Africa | |
| Leontocephalus | Broom | 1940 | Valid. | | | |
| Leptotrachelus | Watson | 1921 | Syn. | N/A | N/A | Synonym of Gorgonops |
| Likhoelia | Ginsburg | 1961 | Syn. | N/A | N/A | Synonym of Tritylodon |
| Limnostygis | Carroll | 1967 | Valid. | | | |
| Lobalopex | Sidor; Hopson; Keyser | 2004 | Valid. | Middle-Upper Permian | South Africa | |
| Lophorhinus | Sidor; Smith | 2007 | Valid. | Middle Permian | South Africa | |
| Luangwa | Brink | 1963 | Valid. | Middle Triassic | Zambia and Brazil | |
| Lufengia | Chow; Hu | 1959 | Valid. | Lower Jurassic | China | |
| Lumkuia | Hopson; Kitching | 2001 | Valid. | Lower Triassic | South Africa | |
| Lycaenodon | Broom | 1925 | Valid. | Upper Permian | South Africa | |
| Lycaenodontoides | Haughton | 1929 | Syn. | N/A | N/A | Synonym of Arctognathus |
| Lycaenoides | Broom | 1925 | Valid. | | | |
| Lycaenops | Broom | 1925 | Valid. | Middle-Upper Permian | South Africa | |
| Lycideops | Broom | 1931 | Valid. | | | |
| Lycosuchus | Broom | 1903 | Valid. | | | |
| Lystrosaurus | Cope | 1870 | Valid. | Upper Permian - Early Triassic | South Africa, Zambia, India, China, Mongolia, Russia, Antarctica, Australia and Laos | |
| Madysaurus | Tatarinov | 2005 | Valid. | | | |
| Massetognathus | Romer | 1967 | Valid. | Middle Triassic | Brazil and Argentina | |
| Mastersonia | Olson | 1962 | Valid. | Lower Permian | United States of America | |
| Maubeugia | Godefroit; Battail | 1997 | Valid. | | | |
| Megacyclops | Broom | 1931 | Preocc. | N/A | N/A | Preoccupied by crustacean Megacyclops Kiefer, 1927. Synonym of Rhachiocephalus |
| Megagomphodon | Romer | 1972 | Syn. | N/A | N/A | Synonym of Massetognathus |
| Megawhaitsia | Ivakhnenko | 2008 | Valid. | Upper Permian | Russia | |
| Melinodon | Broom | 1905 | Syn. | N/A | N/A | Synonym of Bauria |
| Menadon | Flynn; Parrish; Rakotosamimanana; Ranivoharimanana; Wyss | 2000 | Valid. | Middle-Late Triassic | Madagascar | |
| Micranteosaurus | Boonstra | 1954 | Valid. | | | |
| Micrictodon | Broom | 1937 | Syn. | N/A | N/A | Synonym of Thrinaxodon |
| Microgomphodon | Seeley | 1895 | Valid | Early Triassic | South Africa | |
| Microscalenodon | Hahn; Lepage; Wouters | 1988 | Valid. | | | |
| Microsyodon | Ivakhnenko | 1995 | Valid. | Upper Permian | Russia | |
| Microurania | Ivakhnenko | 1996 | Valid. | Upper Permian | Russia | |
| Mnemeiosaurus | Nopsca | 1928 | Syn. | N/A | N/A | Synonymy of Deuterosaurus |
| Molybdopygus | Tchudinov | 1964 | Valid. | | | |
| Mormosaurus | Watson | 1914 | Valid. | | | |
| Moschognathus | Broom | 1914 | Syn. | N/A | N/A | Synonym of Moschops |
| Moschoides | Byrne | 1937 | Syn. | N/A | N/A | Synonym of Moschops |
| Moschops | Broom | 1911 | Valid. | Upper Permian | South Africa | |
| Moschorhinus | Broom | 1920 | Valid. | Upper Permian - Lower Triassic | South Africa | |
| Moschosaurus | Haughton | 1915 | Valid. | | | |
| Moschowhaitsia | Tatarinov | 1963 | Valid. | Upper Permian | Russia | |
| Mucrotherium | von Huene | 1933 | Syn. | N/A | N/A | Synonym of Oligokyptus |
| Myctosuchus | Efremov | 1937 | Syn. | N/A | N/A | Synonym of Venyukovia |
| Myosauroides | Broom | 1949 | Valid. | | | |
| Myosaurus | Haughton | 1917 | Valid. | Lower Triassic | South Africa and Antarctica | |
| Nanictocephalus | Broom | 1940 | Valid. | | | |
| Nanictops | Carroll | 1988 | Valid. | | | |
| Nanictosaurus | Broom | 1936 | Valid. | | | |
| Nanocynodon | Tatarinov | 1968 | Valid. | Upper Permian | Russia | |
| Nanogomphodon | Hopson; Sues | 2006 | Valid. | Middle Triassic | Germany | |
| Nasoplanites | Surkov | 1999 | Valid. | Middle Triassic | Russia | |
| Nearctylodon | Lewis | 1986 | Syn. | N/A | N/A | Synonym of Kayentatherium |
| Neomegacyclops | Broom | 1931 | Syn. | N/A | N/A | Synonym of Rhachiocephalus |
| Newtonella | Broom | 1937 | Valid. | | | |
| Niaftasuchus | Ivakhnenko | 1990 | Valid. | Upper Permian | Russia | |
| Nikkasaurus | Ivakhnenko | 2000 | Valid. | | | |
| Nitosaurus | Romer | 1937 | Valid. | Lower Permian | United States of America | |
| Niuksenitia | Tatarinov | 1977 | Valid. | Upper Permian | Russia | |
| Notaelurops | Broom | 1936 | Syn. | N/A | N/A | Synonym of Theriognathus |
| Notosollasia | Broom | 1925 | Syn. | N/A | N/A | Synonym of Theriognathus |
| Notosyodon | Tchudinov | 1968 | Valid. | Upper Permian | Kazakhstan | |
| Nothogomphodon | Tatarinov | 1976 | Valid. | Middle Triassic | Russia | |
| Odontocyclops | Keyser; Cruickshank | 1979 | Syn. | N/A | N/A | Synonym of Rhachiocephalus |
| Oligokyphus | Henning | 1922 | Valid. | Lower Jurassic | China, England, Germany and United States of America | |
| Ordosia | Hou | 1979 | Syn. | N/A | N/A | Synonym of Ordosiodon |
| Ordosiodon | Young | 1961 | Valid. | Lower Triassic | China | |
| Orthopus | Kutorga | 1838 | Valid. | | | |
| Otsheria | Tchudinov | 1960 | Valid. | Upper Permian | Russia | |
| Oudenodon | Owen | 1860 | Valid. | Middle-Upper Permian | South Africa, Zambia, Madagascar, Malawi and India | |
| Pachydectes | Rubidge; Sidor; Modesto | 2006 | Valid. | Middle Permian | South Africa | |
| Pachyrhinos | Broili; Schroeder | 1934 | Syn. | N/A | N/A | Synonym of Gorgonops |
| Pachytegos | Haughton | 1932 | Valid. | Upper Permian | Tanzania | |
| Palemydops | Broom | 1921 | Valid. | | | |
| Parabradysaurus | Efremov | 1954 | Valid. | Upper Permian | Russia | |
| Paraburnetia | Smith; Rubidge; Sidor | 2006 | Valid. | Upper Permian | South Africa | |
| Paragalerhinus | Sigogneau-Russell | 1970 | Valid. | | | |
| Parakennemeyeria | Sun | 1960 | Valid. | Lower-Middle Triassic | China | |
| Paranteosaurus | Boonstra | 1954 | Valid. | | | |
| Parascapanodon | Boonstra | 1955 | Syn. | N/A | N/A | Synonym of Parascapanodon |
| Parathrinaxodon | Parrington | 1936 | Valid. | | | |
| Pardocephalus | Broom | 1948 | Syn. | N/A | N/A | Synonym of Arctops |
| Parringtoniella | Toerien | 1953 | Valid. | | | |
| Parvobestiola | Surkov | 1999 | Valid. | Middle Triassic | Russia | |
| Pascualgnathus | Bonaparte | 1966 | Valid. | Lower Triassic | Argentina | |
| Patranomodon | Rubidge; Hopson | 1990 | Valid. | Middle-Upper Permian | South Africa | |
| Pedaeosaurus | Colbert; Kitching | 1979 | Valid. | Upper Permian - Lower Triassic | South Africa and Antarctica | |
| Pelanomodon | Broom | 1938 | Valid. | Upper Permian | South Africa | |
| Pelorocyclops | van Hoepen | 1934 | Syn. | N/A | N/A | Synonym of Rhachiocephalus |
| Permocynodon | Sushkin | 1927 | Syn. | N/A | N/A | Synonym of Dvinia |
| Phocosaurus | Seeley | 1888 | Valid. | | | |
| Phoneosuchus | Efremov | 1954 | Valid. | | | |
| Phreatosaurus | Efremov | 1954 | Valid. | Middle Permian | Russia | |
| Phreatosuchus | Efremov | 1954 | Valid. | Middle Permian | Russia | |
| Phthinosaurus | Efremov | 1954 | Valid. | Upper Permian | Russia | |
| Phthinosuchus | Efremov | 1954 | Valid. | | | |
| Placerias | Lucas | 1904 | Valid. | | | |
| Platycraniellus | van Hoepen | 1916 | Valid. | Lower Triassic | South Africa | |
| Platycyclops | Broom | 1932 | Syn. | N/A | N/A | Synonym of Rhachiocephalus |
| Plintogomphodon | Sues; Olsen; Carter | 1999 | Valid. | Late Triassic | United States of America | |
| Pnigalion | Watson | 1914 | Syn. | N/A | N/A | Synonym of Moschops |
| Poecilospondylus | Case | 1910 | Syn. | | | |
| Polistodon | He; Cai | 1984 | Valid. | Middle Jurassic | China | |
| Porosteognathus | Vjuschkov | 1955 | Valid. | Upper Permian | Russia | |
| Pravoslavleria | Vjuschkov | 1953 | Valid. | Upper Permian | Russia | |
| Pristerodon | Huxley | 1868 | Valid. | Middle Permian | South Africa and India | |
| Pristerognathus | Seeley | 1895 | Valid. | Middle Permian | South Africa | |
| Probelesodon | Romer | 1969 | Syn. | N/A | N/A | Different growth stage of the genus Chiniquodon |
| Proburnetia | Tatarinov | 1968 | Valid. | Upper Permian | Russia | |
| Procynosuchus | Broom | 1937 | Valid. | Upper Permian | South Africa | |
| Prodicynodon | Broom | 1904 | Valid. | | | |
| Proexaerotodon | Bonaparte | 1963 | Syn. | N/A | N/A | Synonym of Exaerotodon |
| Progalesaurus | Sidor; Smith | 2004 | Valid. | Lower Triassic | South Africa | |
| Prolystrosaurus | Haughton | 1917 | Syn. | N/A | N/A | Synonym of Lystrosaurus |
| Promoschorhynchus | Brink | 1954 | Valid. | | | |
| Propelanomodon | Toerien | 1955 | Valid. | | | |
| Prorubidgea | Broom | 1940 | Valid. | | | |
| Protacmon | Watson | 1920 | Syn. | N/A | N/A | Synonym of Diademodon |
| Protheriodon | Bonaparte; Soares; Schultz | 2006 | Valid. | Middle Triassic | Brazil | |
| Protuberum | Reichel; Schultz; Soares | 2009 | Valid. | Middle Triassic | Brazil | |
| Prozostrodon | Bonaparte; Barberena | 2001 | Valid. | Middle Triassic | Brazil | |
| Pseudanteosaurus | Boonstra | 1954 | Syn. | N/A | N/A | Synonym of Anteosaurus |
| Pseudohipposaurus | Boonstra | 1952 | Valid. | | | |
| Rabidosaurus | Kalandadze | 1970 | Valid. | Middle Triassic | Russia | |
| Raranimus | Liu; Rubidge; Li | 2009 | Valid. | Middle Permian | China | |
| Rechnisaurus | Roychodhury | 1970 | Valid.? | Middle Triassic | India | Considered synonym of Kannemeyeria |
| Regisaurus | Mendrez | 1972 | Valid. | Lower Triassic | South Africa | |
| Reiszia | Ivakhnenko | 2000 | Valid. | | | |
| Rewaconodon | Datta; Das; Luo | 2004 | Valid. | Late Triassic | India | |
| Rhachiocephalus | Seeley | 1898 | Valid. | Middle Permian | South Africa | |
| Rhadiodromus | Efremov | 1951 | Valid. | Middle Triassic | Russia | |
| Rhigosaurus | Colbert; Kitching | 1979 | Valid. | Upper Permian - Lower Triassic | South Africa and Antarctica | |
| Rhinocerocephalus | Vjuschkov | 1969 | Valid. | | | |
| Rhinodicynodon | Kalandadze | 1970 | Valid.? | Middle Triassic | Russia | May be synonym of Shansiodon |
| Rhopalodon | Fischer | 1841 | Valid. | Upper Permian | Russia | |
| Rhopalorhinus | Keyser | 1973 | Valid.? | Middle Triassic | Namibia | May be synonym of Shansiodon |
| Riebeeckosaurus | Boonstra | 1952 | Valid. | | | |
| Riograndia | Bonaparte; Ferigolo; Ribeiro | 2001 | Valid. | Late Triassic | Brazil | |
| Robertia | Boonstra | 1948 | Valid. | Middle-Upper Permian | South Africa | |
| Rosieria | Godefroit; Battail | 1997 | Valid. | | | |
| Rubidgea | Broom | 1938 | Valid. | | | |
| Rubidgina | Broom | 1942 | Valid. | | | |
| Rusconiodon | Bonaparte | 1970 | Valid. | Lower Triassic | Argentina | Junior synonym of Andescynodon |
| Sangusaurus | Cox | 1969 | Valid. | | | |
| Santacruzodon | Abdala; Ribeiro | 2003 | Valid. | Middle Triassic | Brazil | |
| Sauroctonus | Bystrov | 1955 | Valid. | Upper Permian | Russia | |
| Scalenodon | Crompton | 1955 | valid. | Middle Triassic | Tanzania and Russia | |
| Scalenodontoides | Crompton; Ellenberger | 1957 | Valid. | | | |
| Scalopognathus | Tatarinov | 1974 | Valid. | Early Triassic | Russia | |
| Scalopolacerta | Mendrez; Carroll | 1979 | Valid. | | | |
| Scaloposaurus | Owen | 1876 | Valid. | | | |
| Scapanodon | Broom | 1904 | Syn. | N/A | N/A | Synonym of Titanosuchus |
| Scylacops | Broom | 1913 | Valid. | | | |
| Scoliomus | Williston; Case | 1915 | Syn. | Lower Permian | United States of America | Junior synonym of Sphenacodon |
| Scullya | Broom | 1929 | Valid. | | | |
| Scylacorhinus | Broom | 1915 | Valid. | | | |
| Scylacosaurus | Broom | 1903 | Valid. | | | |
| Scylacosuchus | Tatarinov | 1968 | Valid. | Upper Permian | Russia | |
| Scymnognathus | Broom | 1915 | Valid. | | | |
| Scymnorhinus | Bonaparte | 1846 | Valid. | | | |
| Scymnosaurus | Broom | 1903 | Valid. | | | |
| Sesamodon | Broom | 1905 | Syn. | N/A | N/A | Synonym of Bauria |
| Sesamondon | author author | 19xx | Valid. | | | |
| Shaanbeikannemeyeria | Cheng | 1980 | Valid | Early Triassic | China | |
| Shansiodon | Yeh | 1959 | Valid. | Middle Triassic | China | |
| Silphedosuchus | Tatarinov | 1977 | Valid. | | | |
| Silphoictidoides | von Huene | 1950 | Valid. | | | |
| Simorhinella | Broom | 1915 | Valid. | | | |
| Sinognathus | Young | 1959 | Valid. | Middle Triassic | China | |
| Sinokannemeyeria | Young | 1937 | Valid. | Middle Triassic | China | |
| Sinophoneus | Cheng; Li | 1996 | Valid. | Upper Permian | China | |
| Smilesaurus | Broom | 1948 | Valid. | Late Permian | South Africa | |
| Stahleckeria | von Huene | 1935 | Valid. | Lower-Upper Triassic | Brazil | |
| Stenocybus | Cheng; Li | 1997 | Valid. | Upper Permian | China | |
| Steppesaurus | Olson; Beerbower | 1953 | Valid. | Lower Permian | United States of America | |
| Striodon | Sun | 1973 | Nomen dubium | N/A | N/A | Striodon magnus is regarded as a nomen dubium, and its type specimen is identified as Dicynodon sp. |
| Struthiocephaloides | Boonstra | 1952 | Valid. | | | |
| Struthiocephalus | Haughton | 1915 | Valid. | Middle Permian | South Africa | |
| Struthionops | Boonstra | 1952 | Valid. | | | |
| Storthyggnathus | Janesch | 1952 | Valid. | | | |
| Styracocephalus | Haughton | 1929 | Valid. | | | |
| Suminia | Ivakhnenko | 1994 | Valid. | Upper Permian | Russia | |
| Sycosaurus | von Huene | 1950 | Valid. | | | |
| Synostocephalus | Broili; Schroeder | 1935 | Valid. | | | |
| Syodon | Kutorga | 1838 | Valid. | | | |
| Sysphinctostoma | Broili; Schroeser | 1936 | Syn. | N/A | N/A | Synonym of Diademodon |
| Tangagorgon | Boonstra | 1953 | Valid. | | | |
| Taognathus | Broom | 1911 | Valid. | | | |
| Tapinocaninus | Rubidge | 1991 | Valid. | Middle Permian | South Africa | |
| Tapinocephalus | Owen | 1876 | Valid. | Middle Permian | South Africa | |
| Taurocephalus | Broom | 1928 | Valid. | | | |
| Taurops | Broom | 1912 | Valid. | | | |
| Tetraceratops | Matthew | 1908 | Valid. | Lower Permian | United States of America | Placement within Therapsida questioned |
| Tetracynodon | Broom; Robinson | 1948 | Valid. | Upper Permian - Lower Triassic | South Africa | |
| Tetragonias | Cruickshank | 1967 | Valid.? | Middle Triassic | South Africa | May be synonym of Shansiodon |
| Theriognathus | Owen | 1876 | Valid. | Upper Permian | South Africa | |
| Theropsis | Cabrera | 1943 | Syn. | N/A | N/A | Synonym of Exaerotodon |
| Theropsodon | von Huene | 1950 | Valid. | | | |
| Thrinaxodon | Seeley | 1894 | Valid. | Lower Triassic | South Africa and Antarctica | |
| Tigrisaurus | Broom; George | 1950 | Valid. | | | |
| Titanognathus | Broili; Schroeder | 1935 | Syn. | N/A | N/A | Synonym of Anteosaurus |
| Titanophoneus | Efremov | 1938 | Valid. | Upper Permian | Russia | |
| Titanosuchus | Owen | 1876 | Valid. | Upper Permian | South Africa | |
| Traversodon | von Huene | 1936 | Valid. | Middle Triassic | Brazil | |
| Traversodontoides | Young | 1974 | Valid. | Middle Triassic | China | |
| Triachodontoides | Broom | 1932 | Syn. | N/A | N/A | Synonym of Trirachodon |
| Triglyphus | Fraas | 1866 | Syn. | N/A | N/A | Synonym of Tritylodon |
| Trirachodon | Seeley | 1895 | Valid. | | | |
| Tritheledon | Broom | 1912 | Valid. | | | |
| Tritylodon | Owen | 1884 | Valid. | | | |
| Tritylodontoides | Fourie | 1962 | Syn. | N/A | N/A | Synonym of Tritylodon |
| Trochosuchus | Broom | 1908 | Valid. | | | |
| Trochosaurus | Haughton | 1915 | Valid. | | | |
| Tropidostoma | Broom | 1915 | Valid. | Middle Permian | South Africa | |
| Trucidocynodon | Oliveira; Soares; Schultz | 2010 | Valid. | Upper Triassic | Brazil | |
| Turfanodon | Sun | 1973 | Valid | Late Permian | China | |
| Ulemica | Ivakhnenko | 1996 | Valid. | Upper Permian | Russia | |
| Ulemosaurus | Ryabinin | 1938 | Valid.? | Upper Permian | Russia | Considered synonym of Moschops |
| Uniserium | von Huene | 1933 | Syn. | N/A | N/A | Synonym of Oligokyptus |
| Uralocynodon | Tatarinov | 1987 | Valid. | Upper Permian | Russia | |
| Uralokannemeyeria | Danilov | 1971 | Valid. | Middle Triassic | Russia | |
| Uraniscosaurus | Nopsca | 1928 | Syn. | N/A | N/A | Synonym of Deuterosaurus |
| Urumchia | Young | 1952 | Valid. | Lower Triassic | China | |
| Venyukovia | Amaltskii | 1922 | Valid. | Upper Permian | Russia | |
| Viatkosuchus | Tatarinov | 1995 | Valid. | | | |
| Vinceria | Bonaparte | 1969 | Valid. | Lower Triassic | Argentina | |
| Wadiasaurus | Roychodhury | 1970 | Valid. | Middle Triassic | India | |
| Wangwusaurus | Young | 1979 | Valid. | | | |
| Watsoniella | Broili; Schroder | 1935 | Syn. | N/A | N/A | Synonym of Bauria |
| Whaitsia | Haughton | 1918 | Syn. | N/A | N/A | Synonym of Theriognathus |
| Xiyukannemeyeria | Liu; Li | 2003 | Valid. | | | |
| Xyrospondylus | Reisz; Heaton; Pynn | 1982 | Valid. | | | |
| Yikezhaogia | Li | 1984 | Valid. | Lower Triassic | China | |
| Yunnania | Cui | 1976 | Preocc. | N/A | N/A | Preoccupied by gastropod Yunnania Mansuy, 1912 |
| Yunnanodon | Cui | 1986 | Valid. | Lower Jurassic | China | Replacement name by Yunnania Cui, 1976 |
| Zambiasaurus | Cox | 1969 | Valid. | Lower Triassic | Zambia | |
| Zopherosuchus | Tchudinov | 1983 | Valid. | Upper Permian | Russia | |
| Zorillodontops | Cluver | 1969 | Valid. | | | |

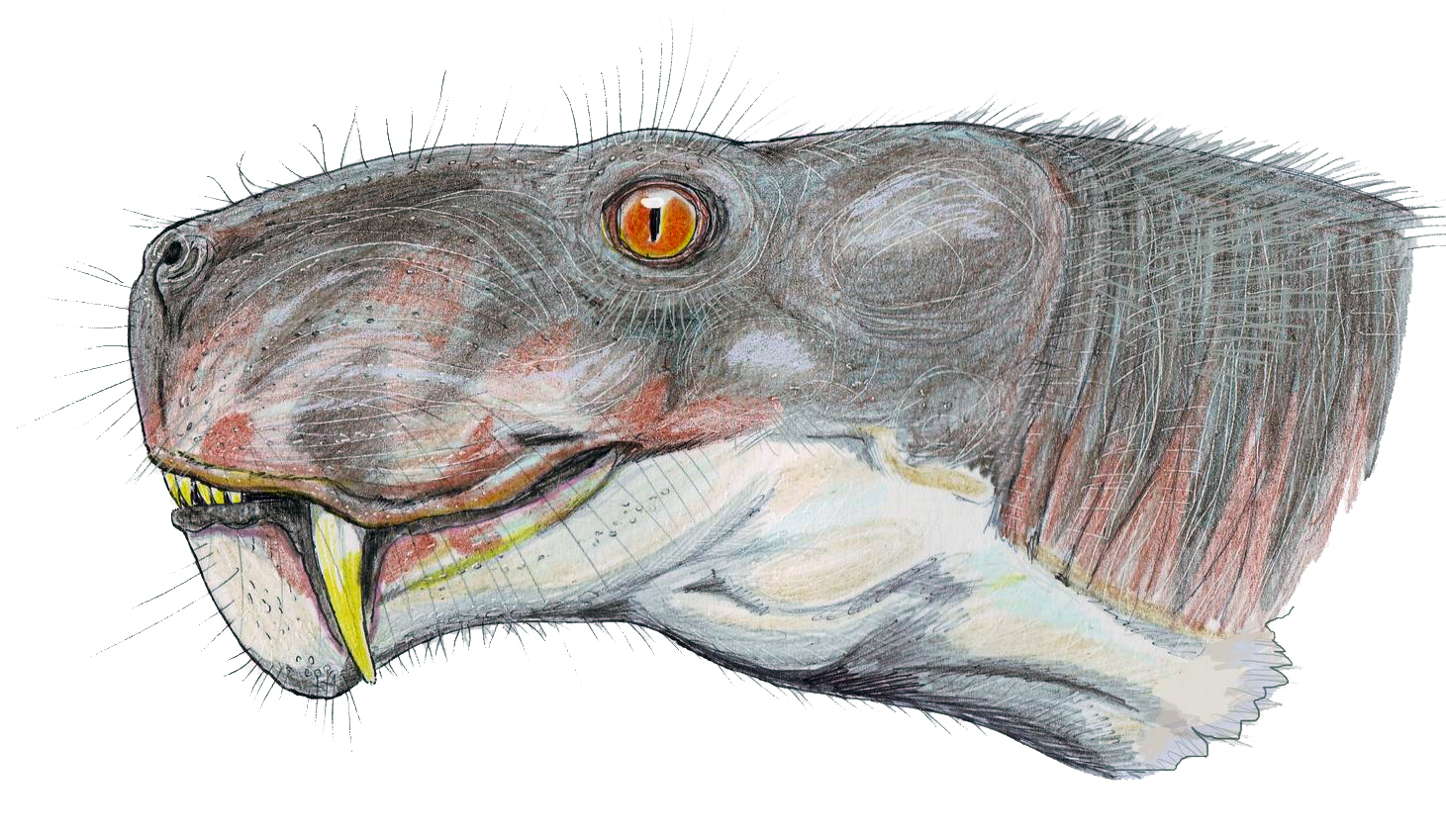
Aelurognathus

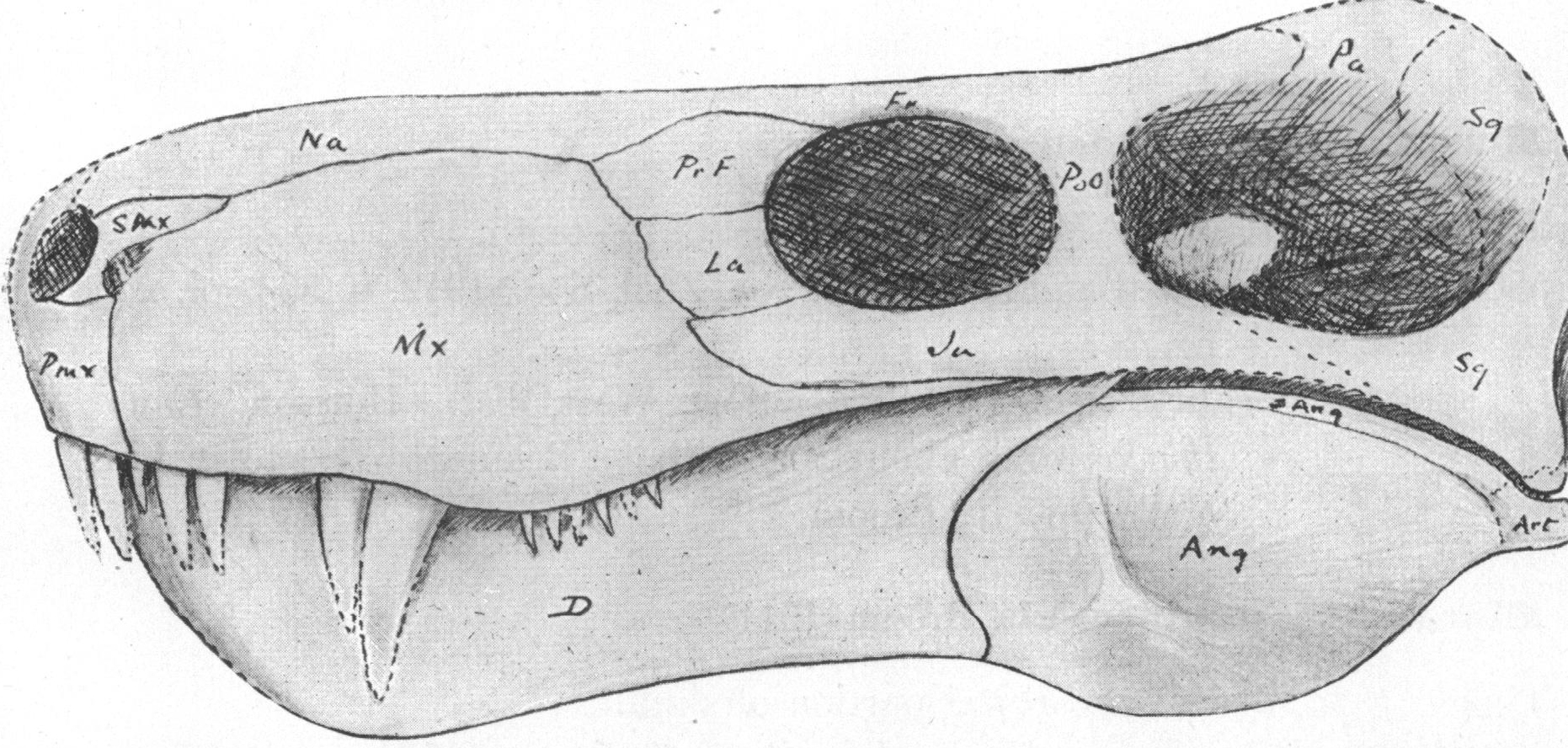
Aloposaurus

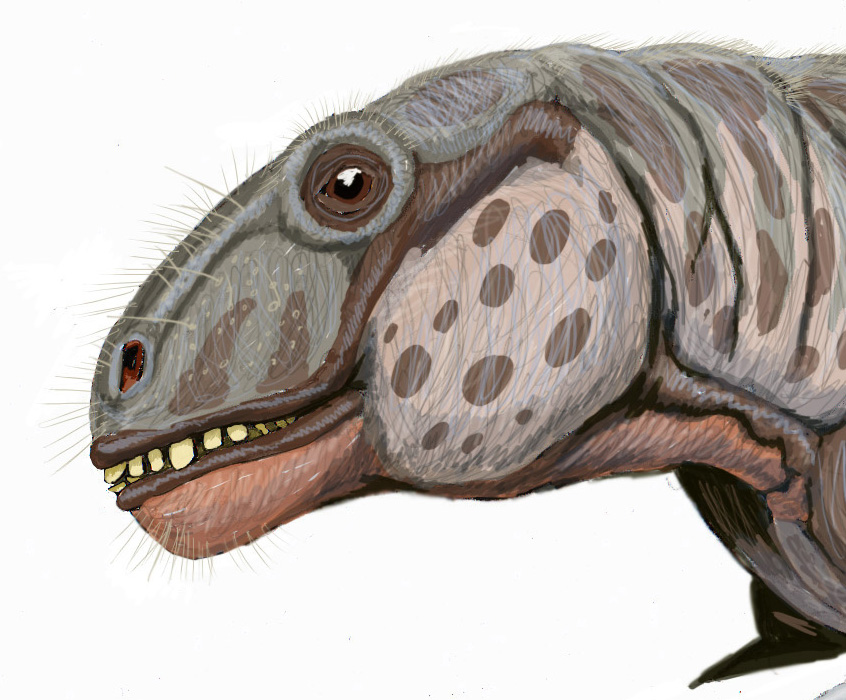
Anomocephalus

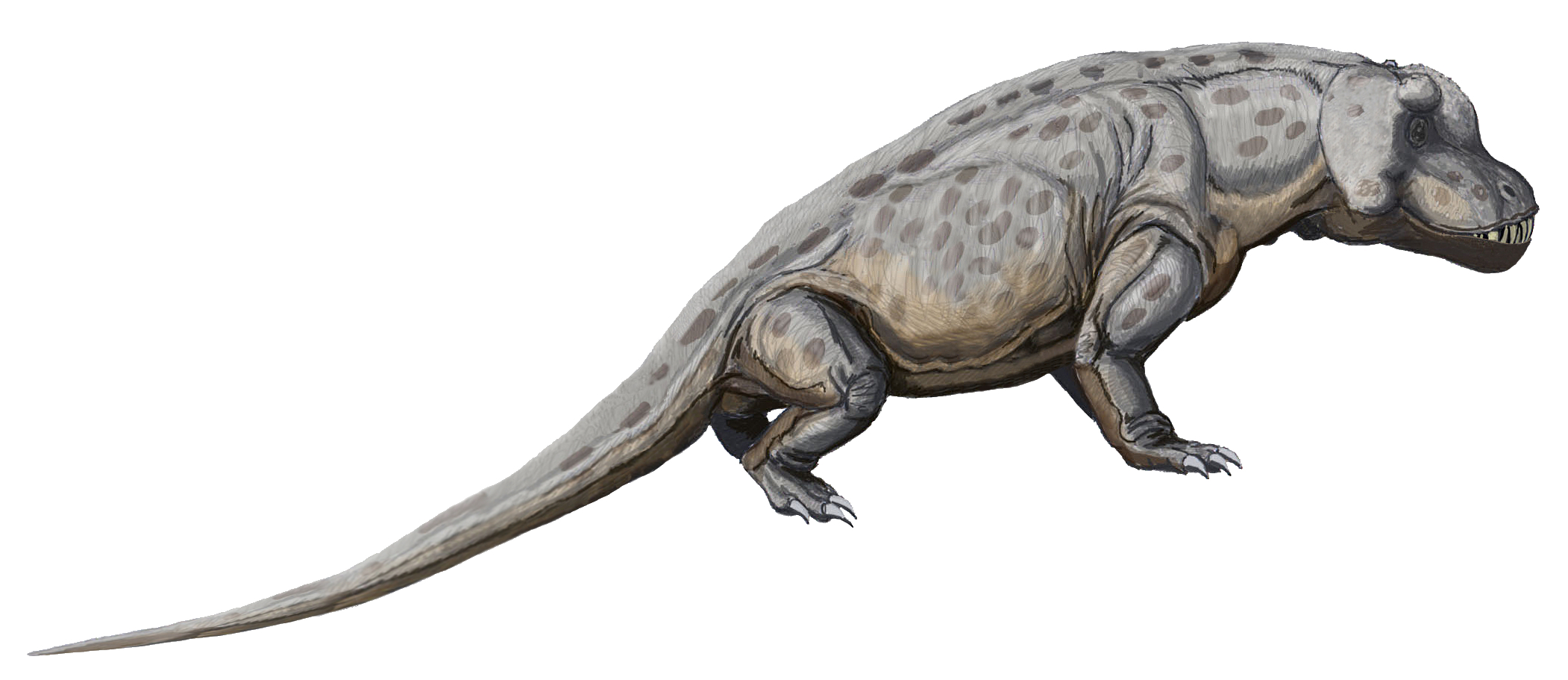
Anteosaurus

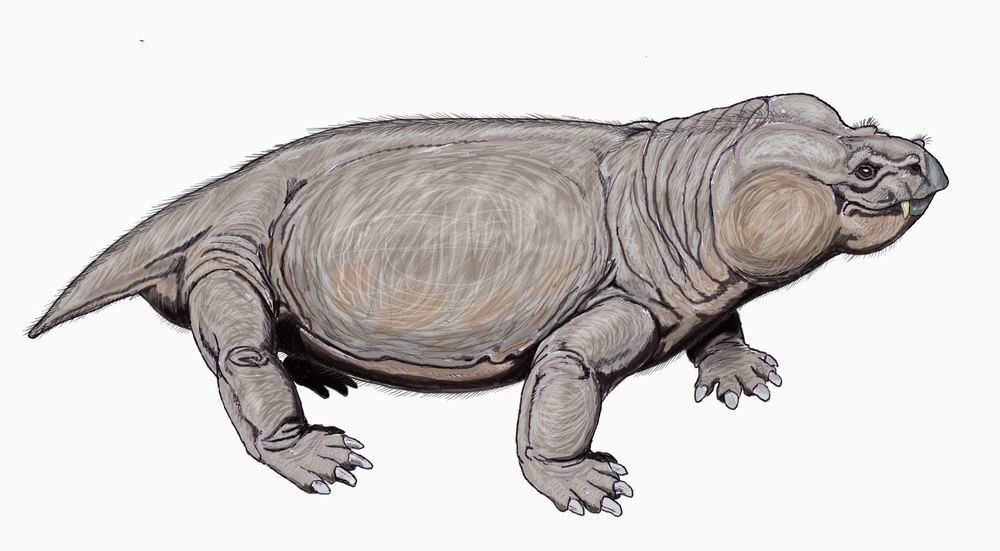
Aulacocephalodon

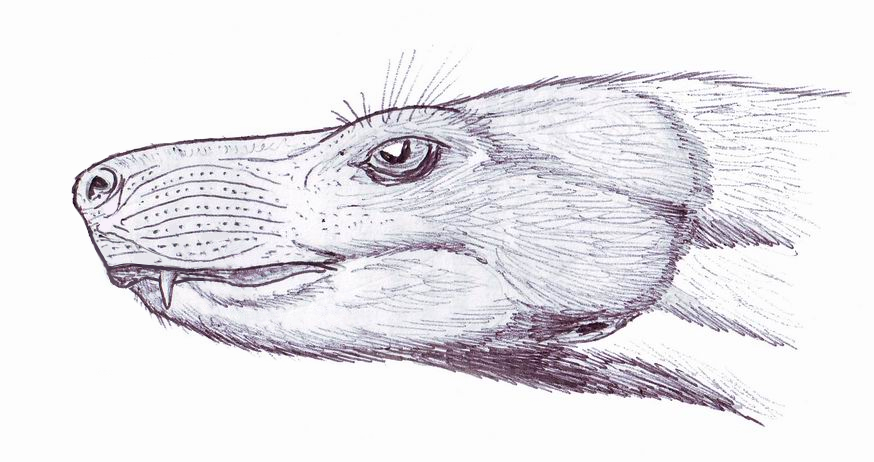
Bauria

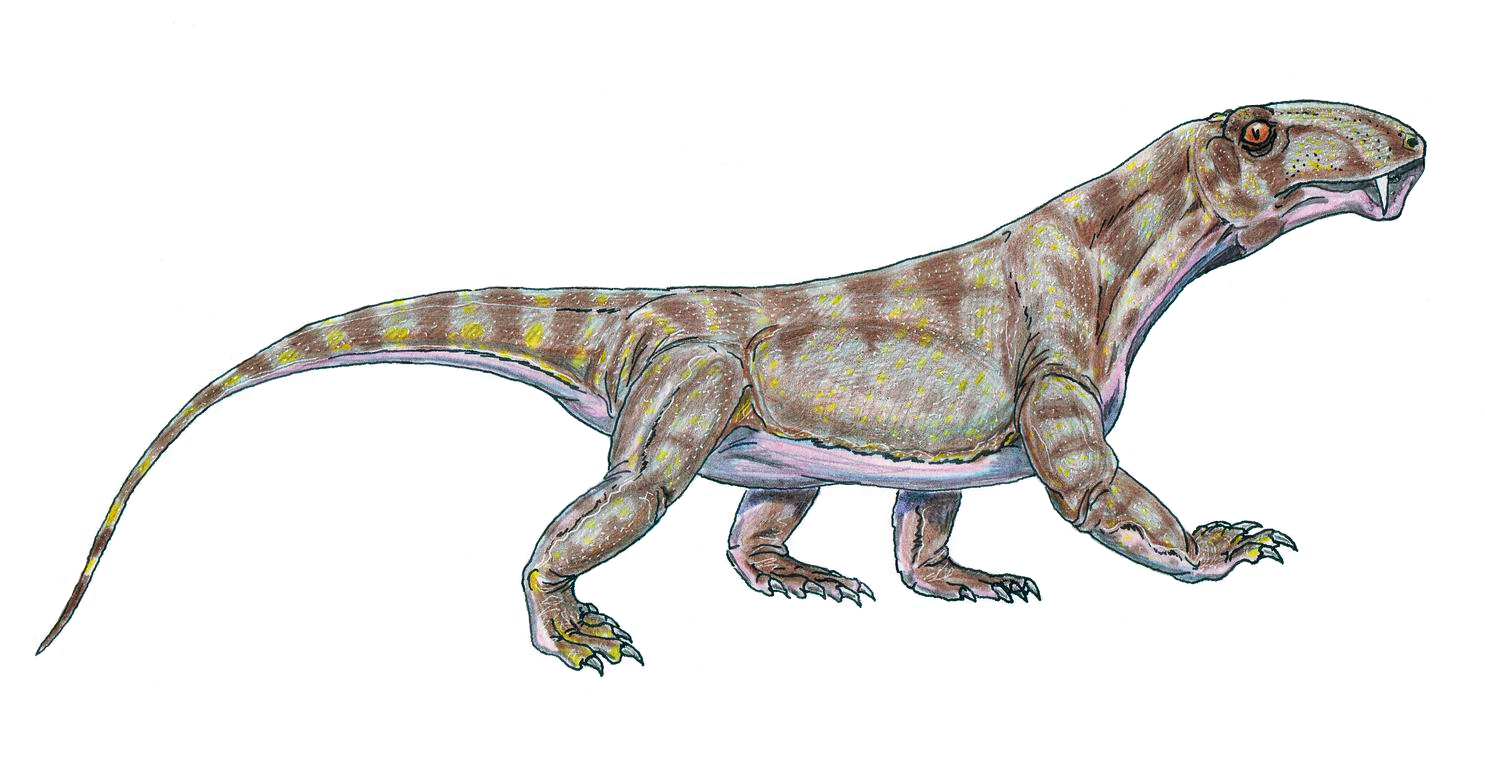
Biarmosuchus

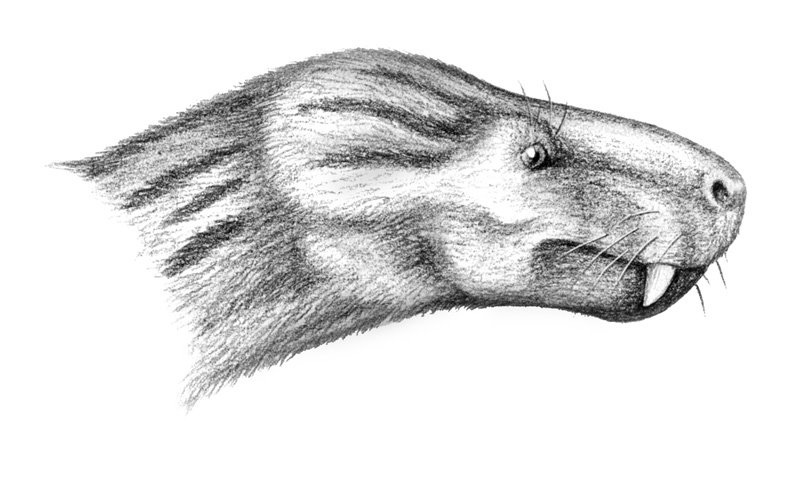
Charassognathus

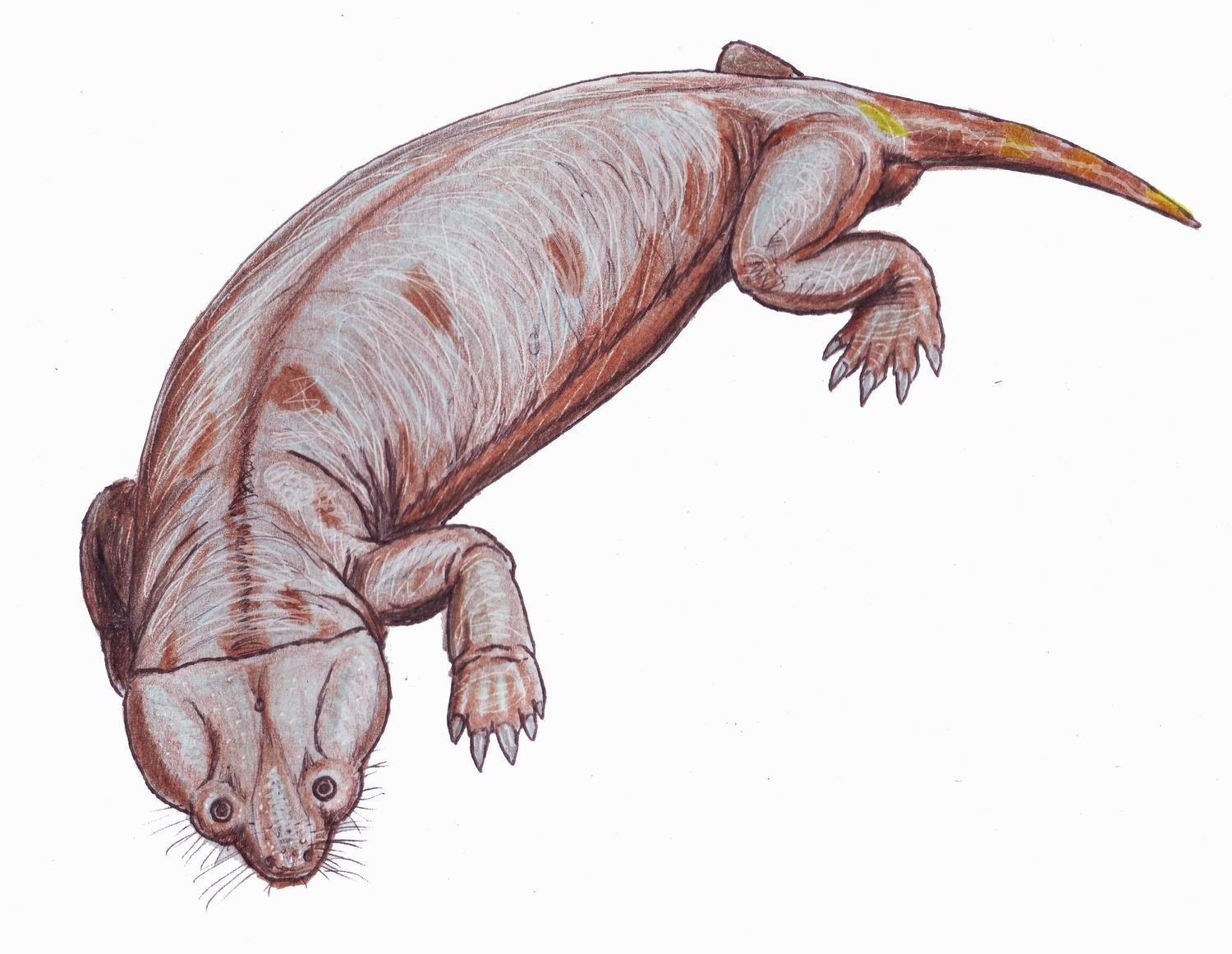
Cistecephalus

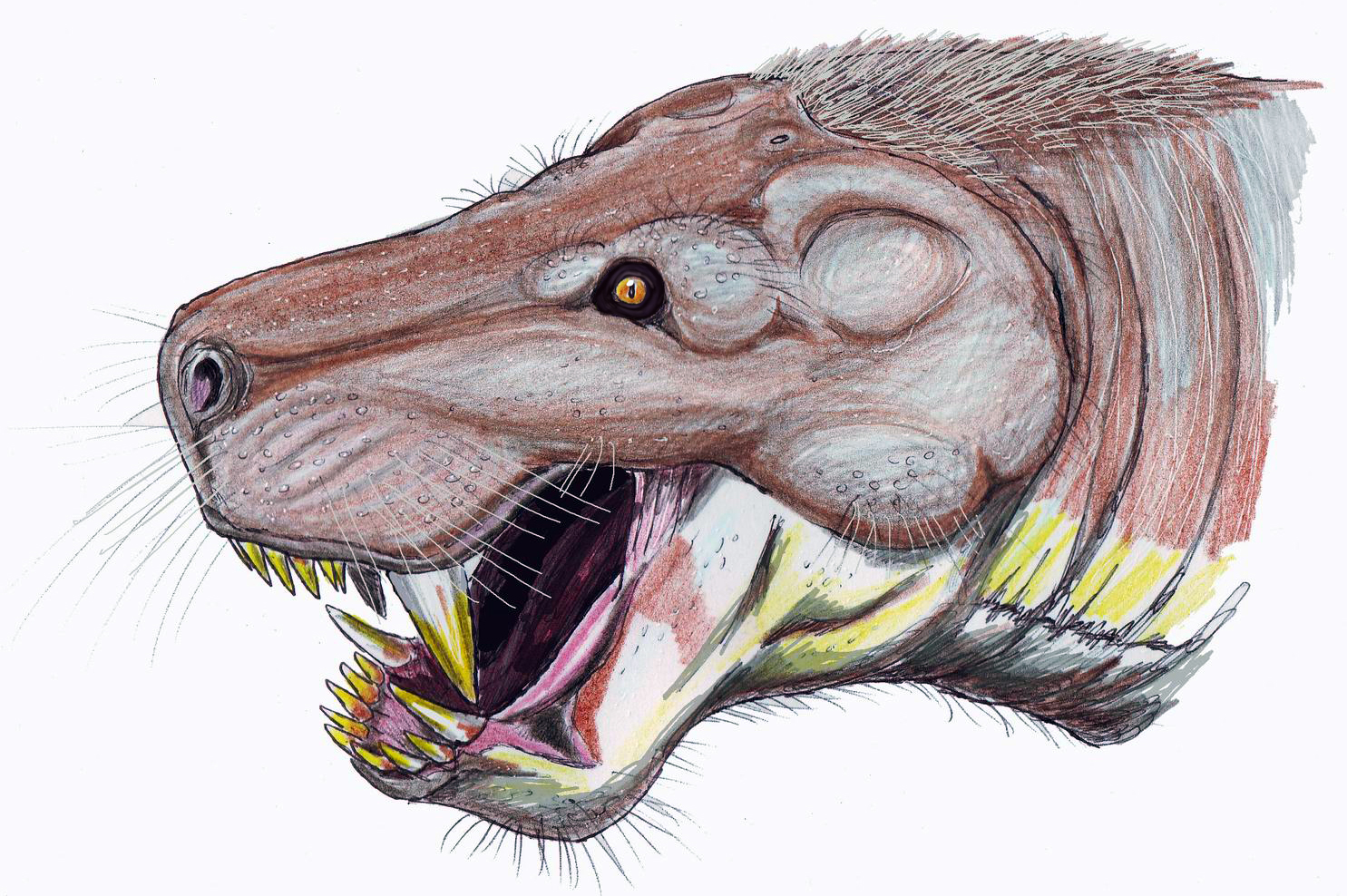
Clelandina

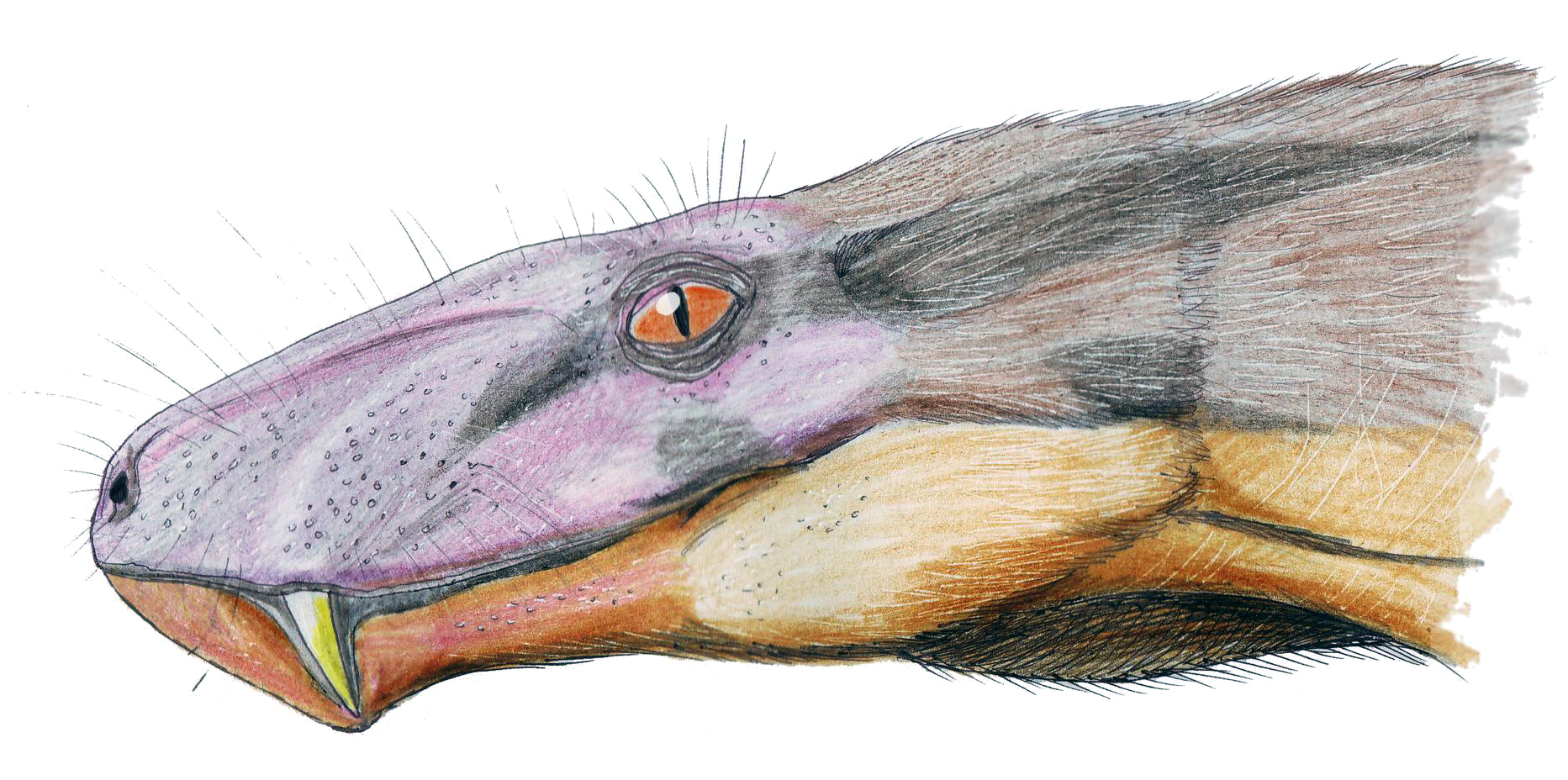
Cyonosaurus

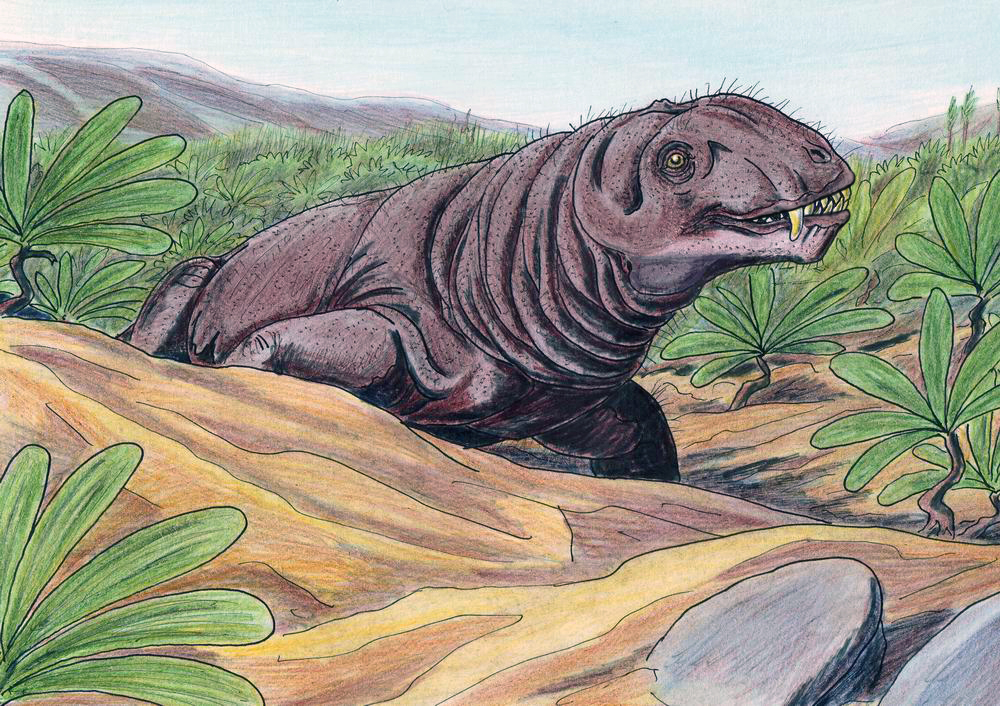
Deuterosaurus

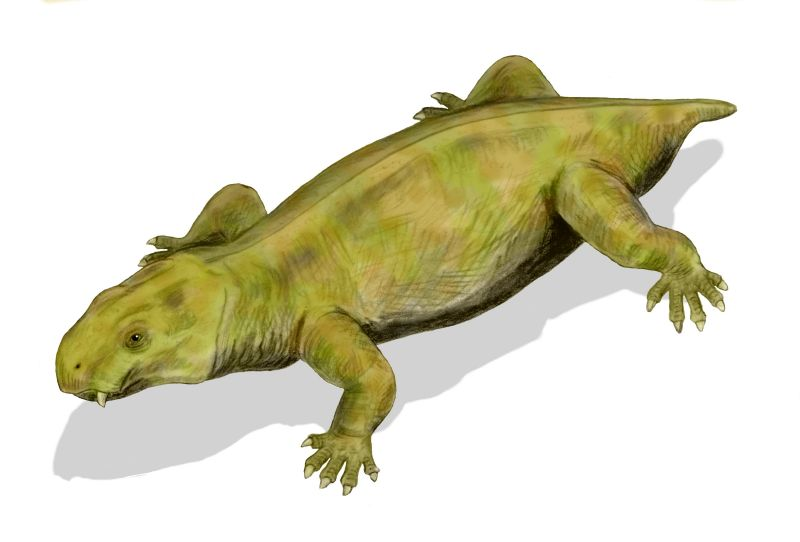
Dicynodon

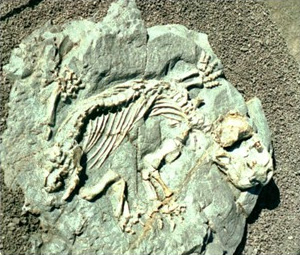
Diictodon

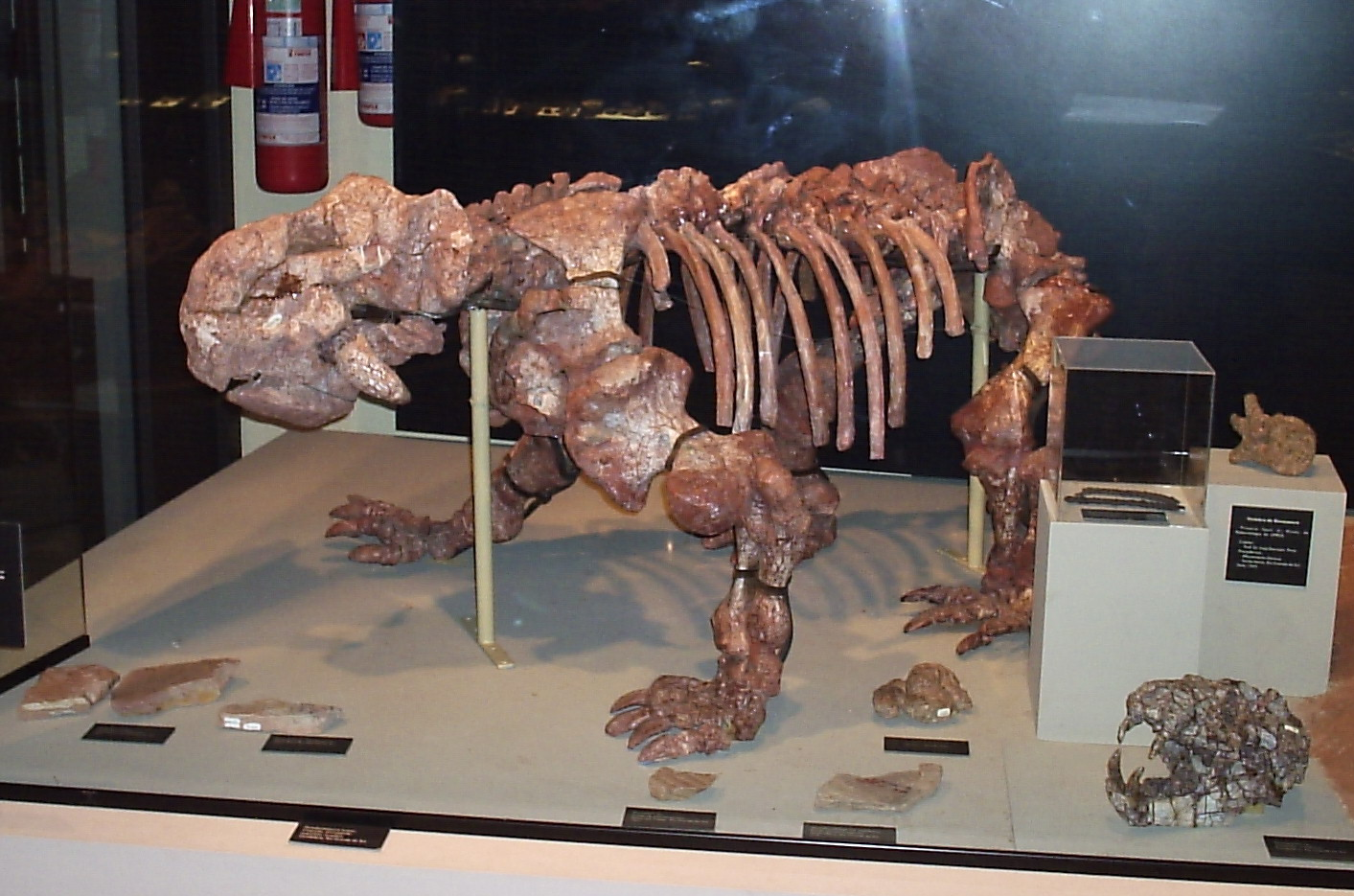
Dinodontosaurus

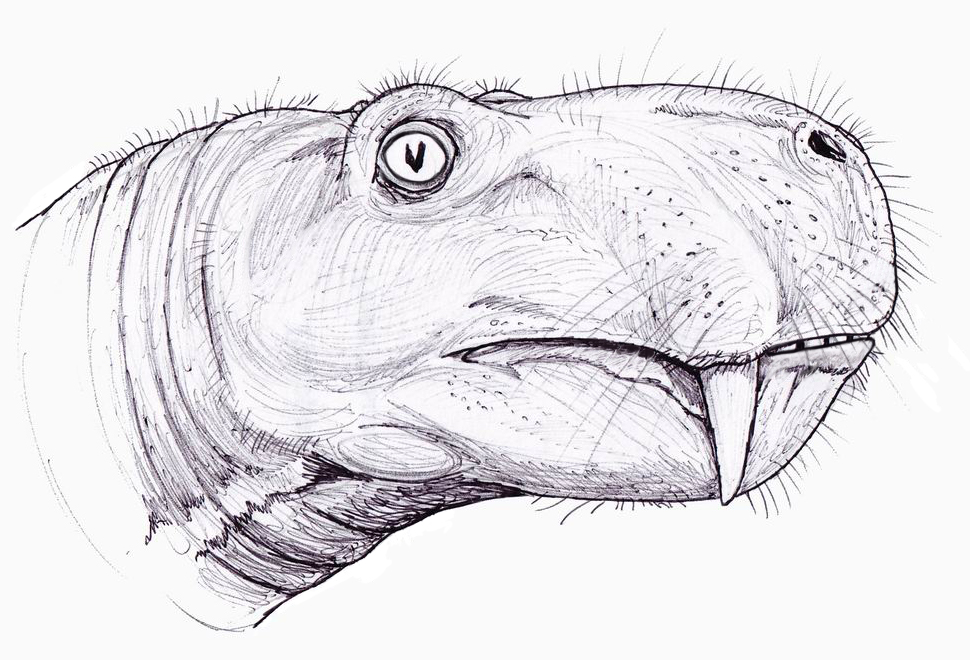
Dinogorgon

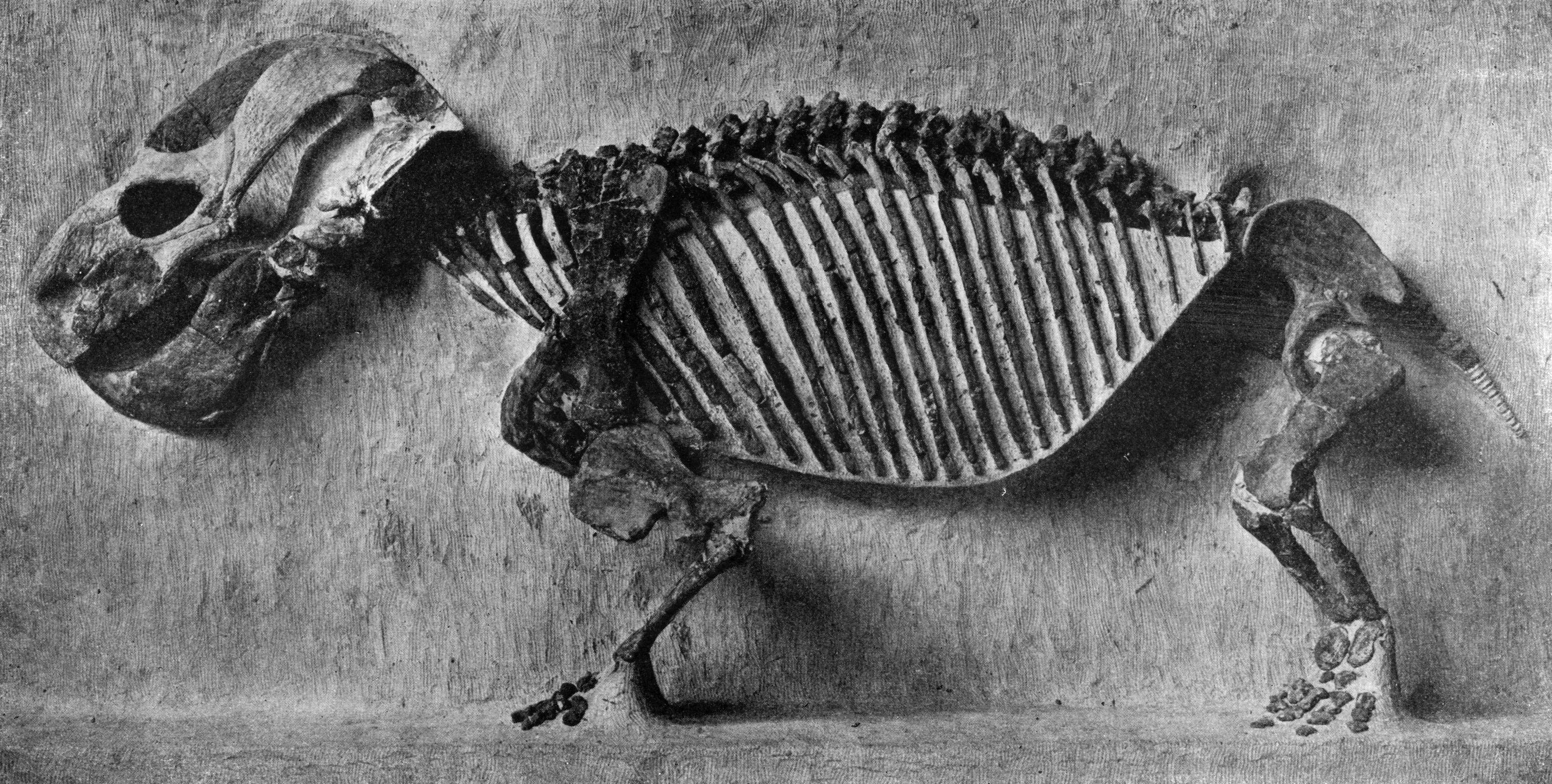
Endothiodon

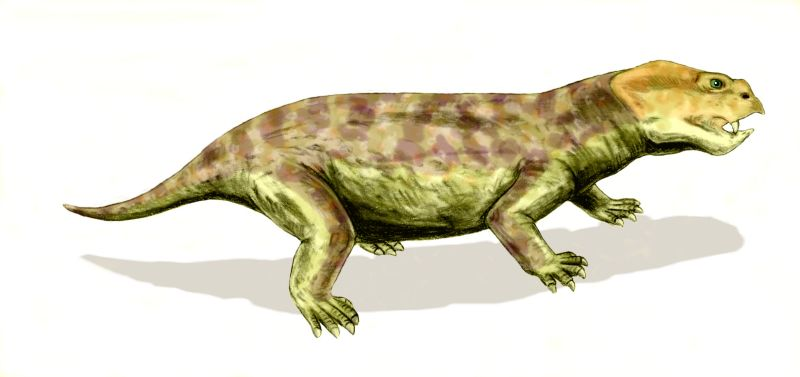
Eodicynodon

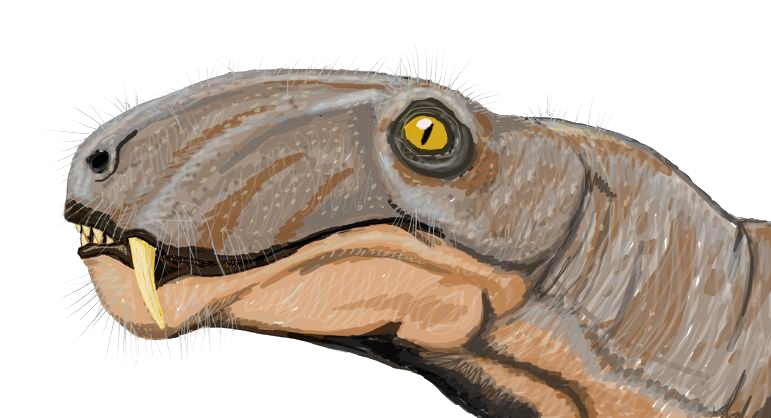
Eotitanosuchus

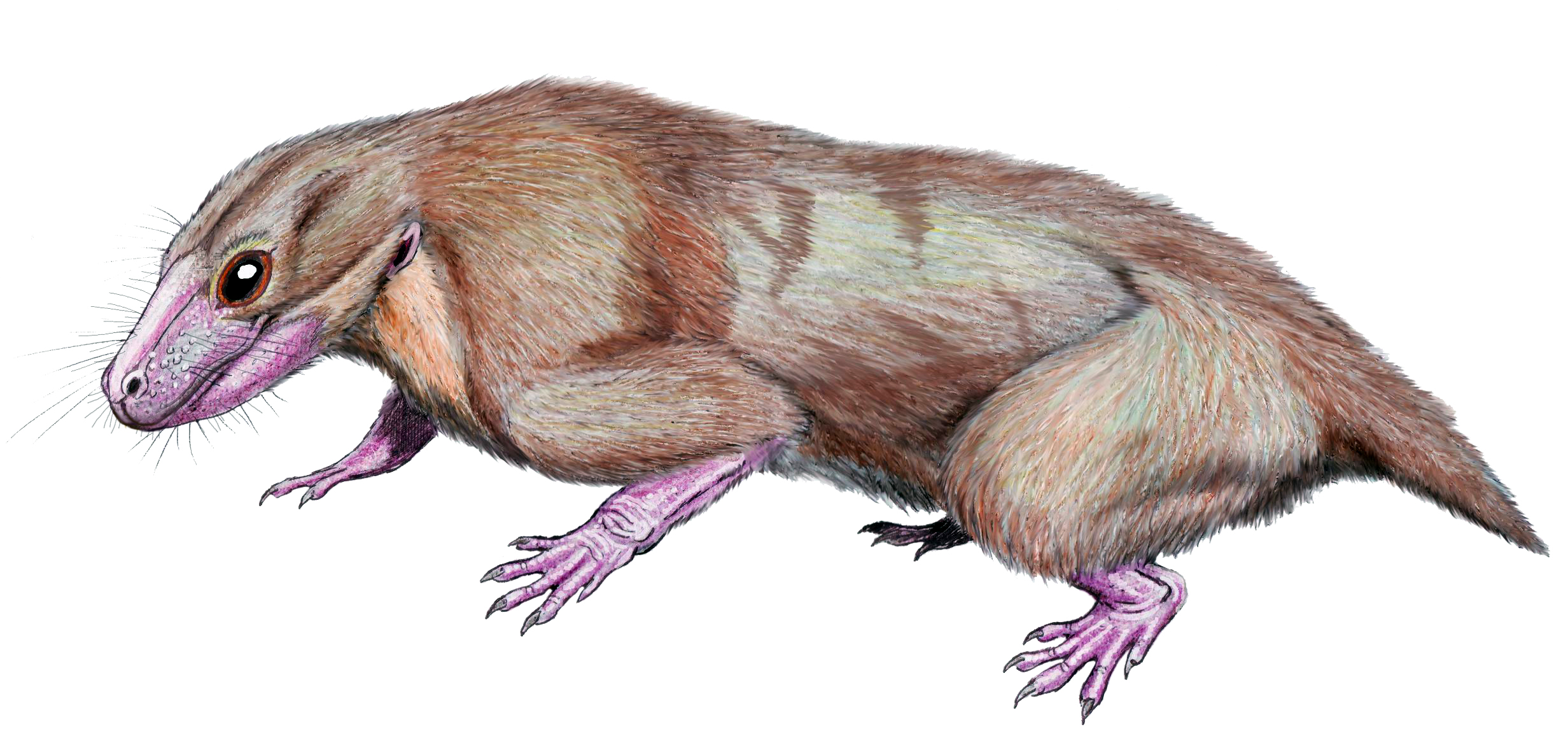
Ericiolacerta

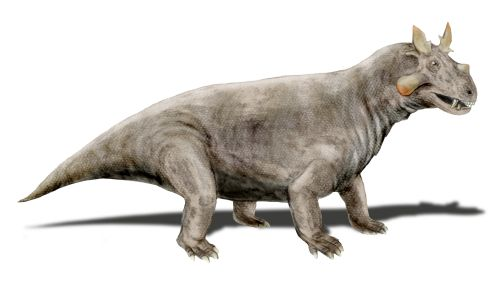
Estemmenosuchus

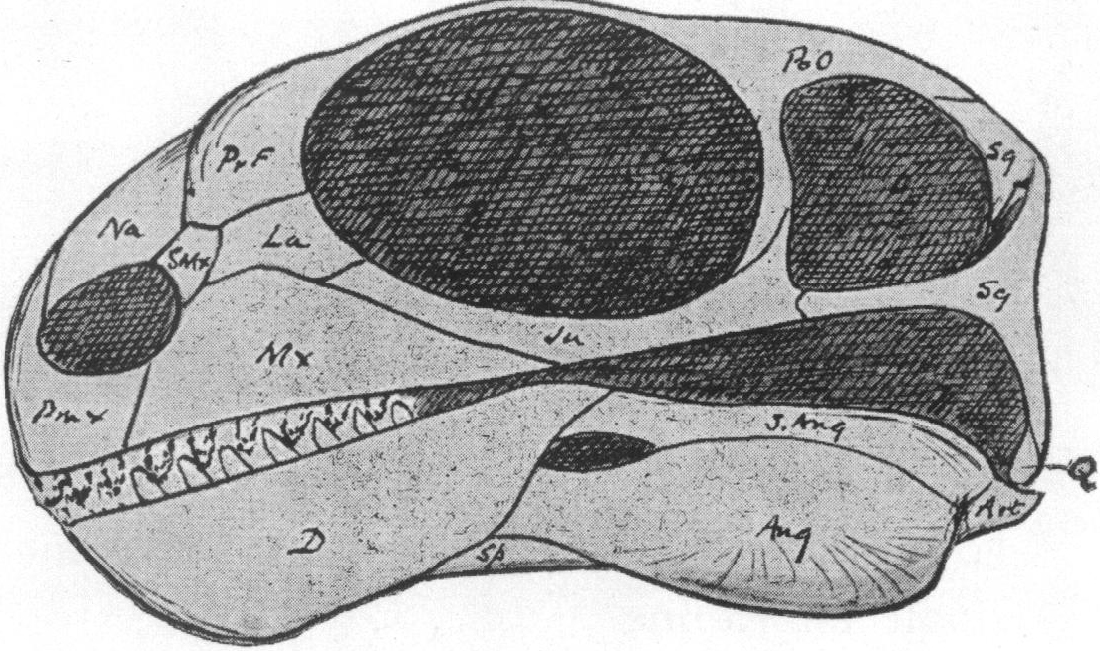
Galepus

Glanosuchus

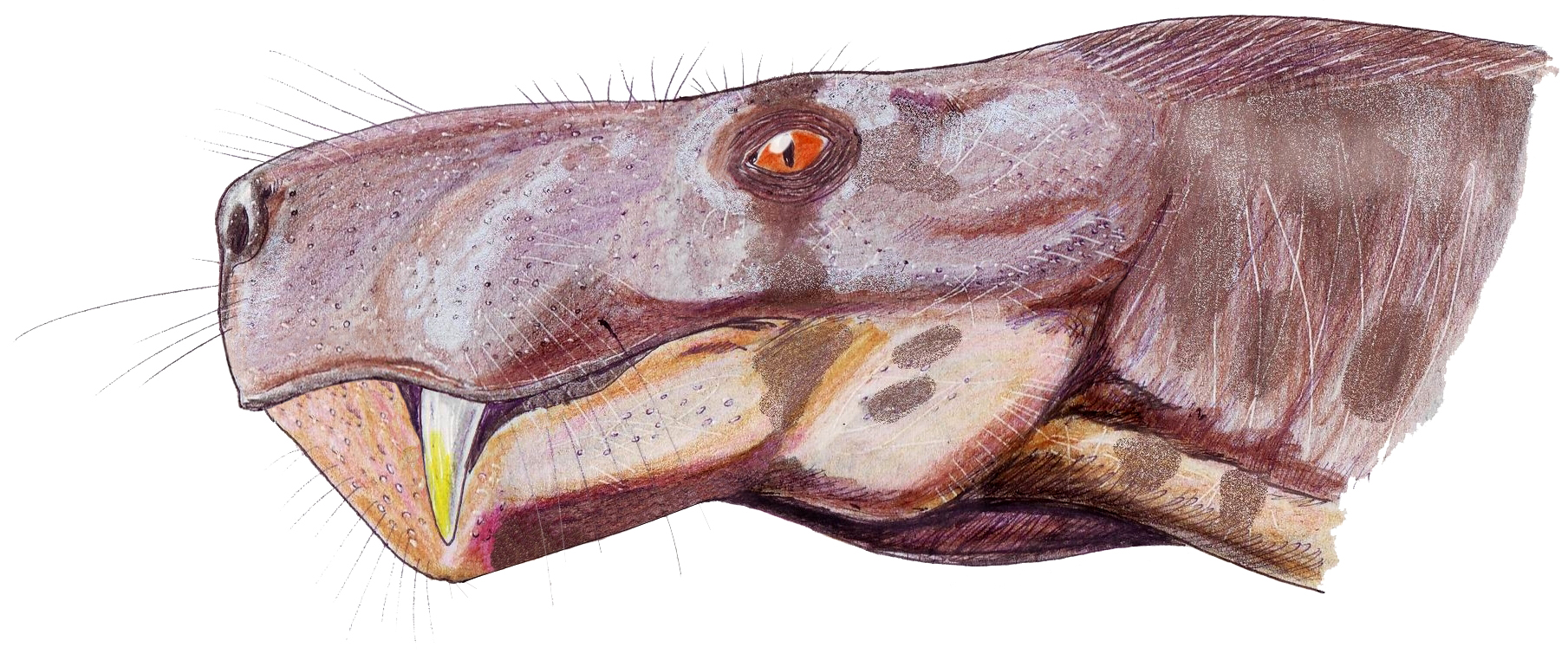
Gorgonops

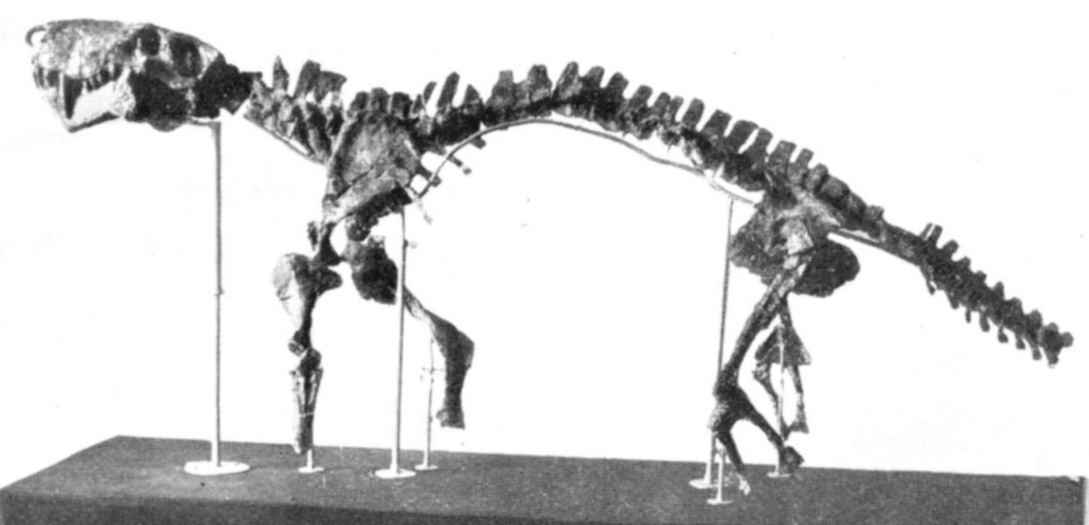
Inostrancevia

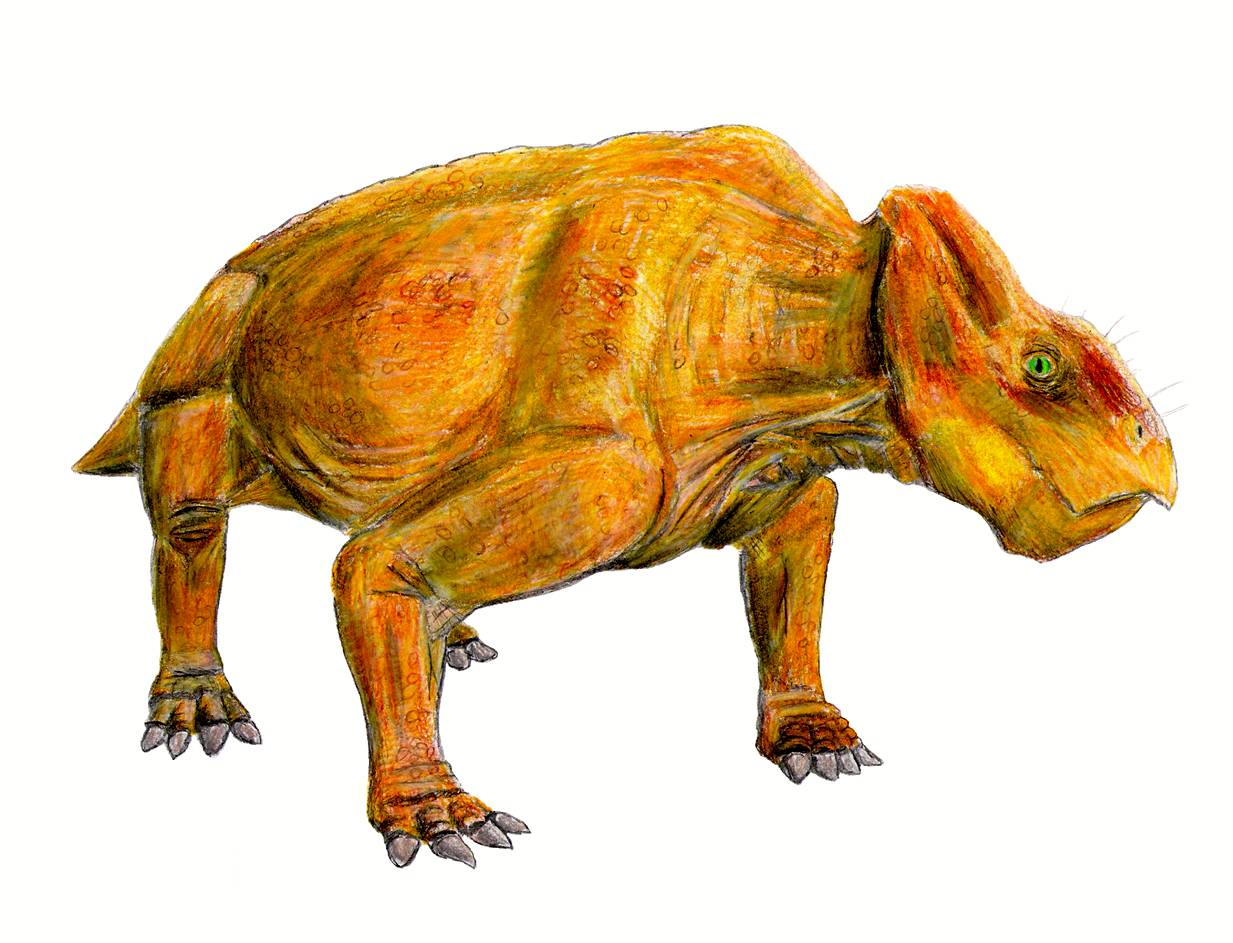
Ischigualastia

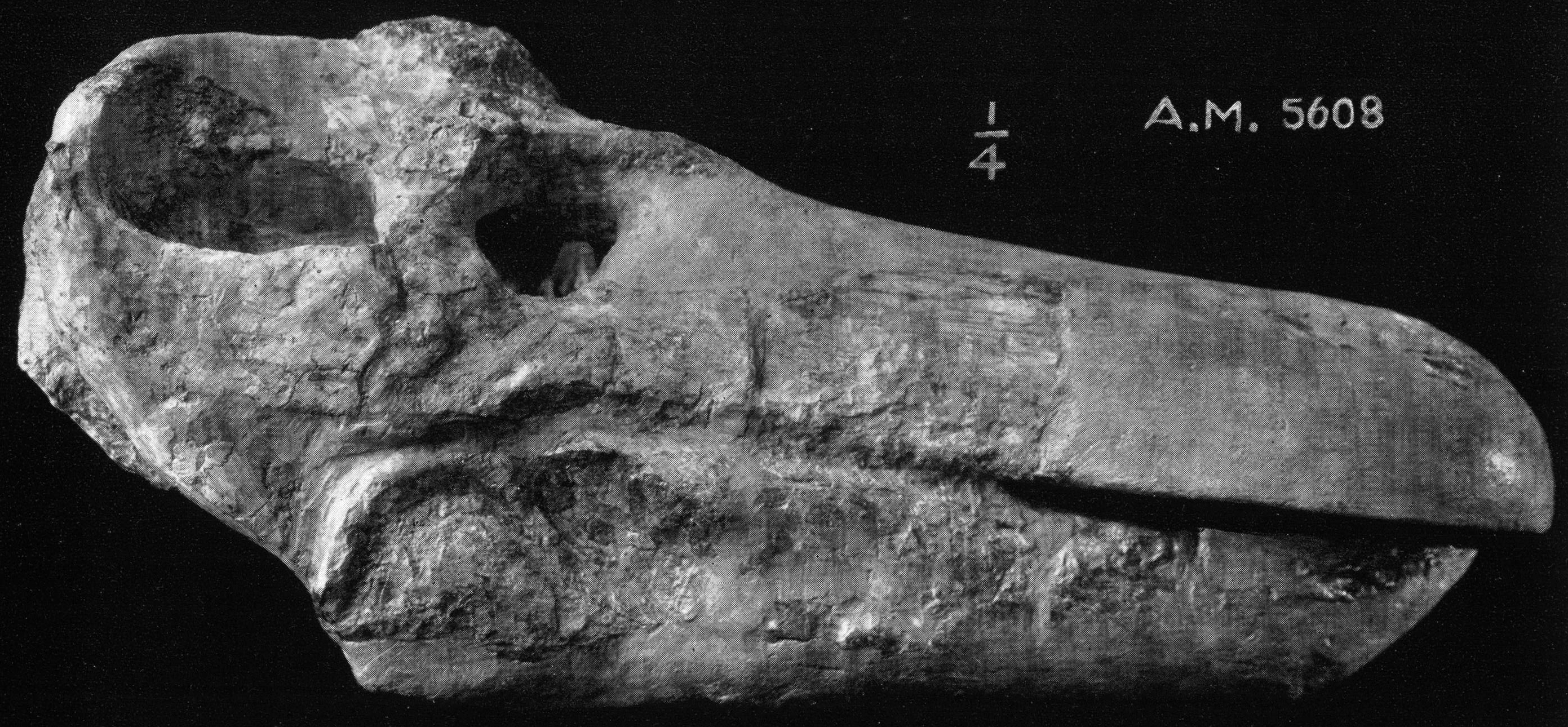
Jonkeria

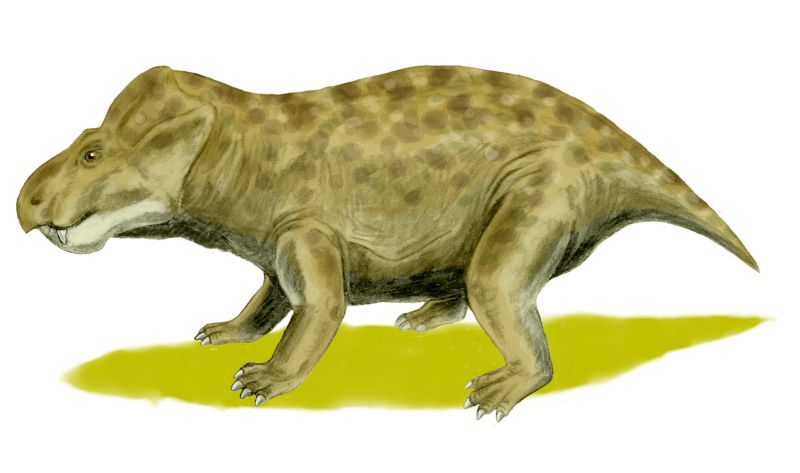
Kannemeyeria

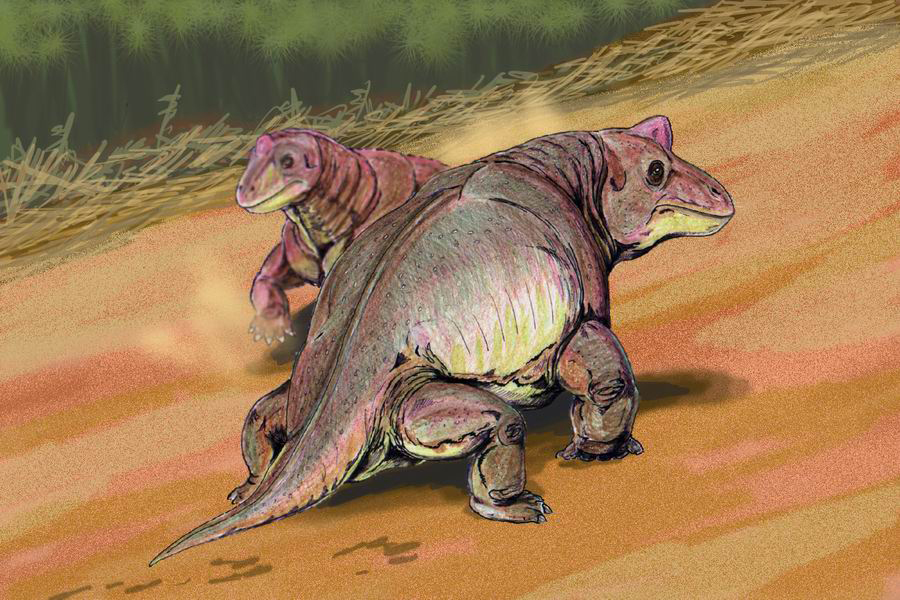
Keratocephalus

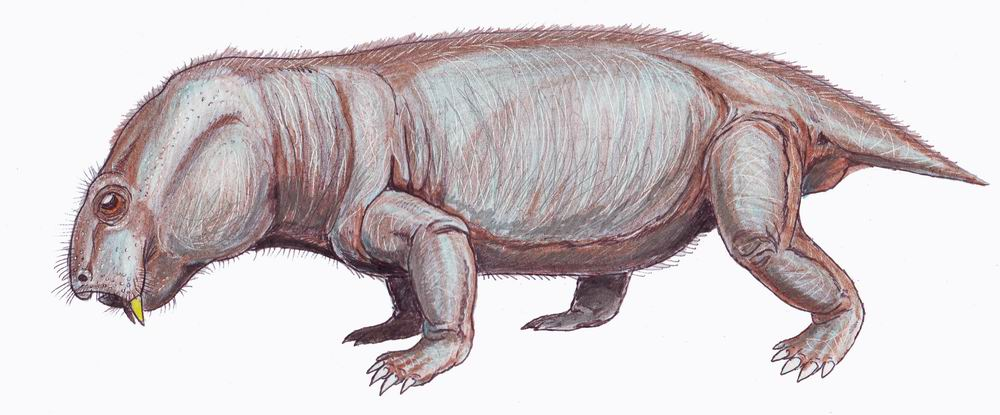
Kingoria

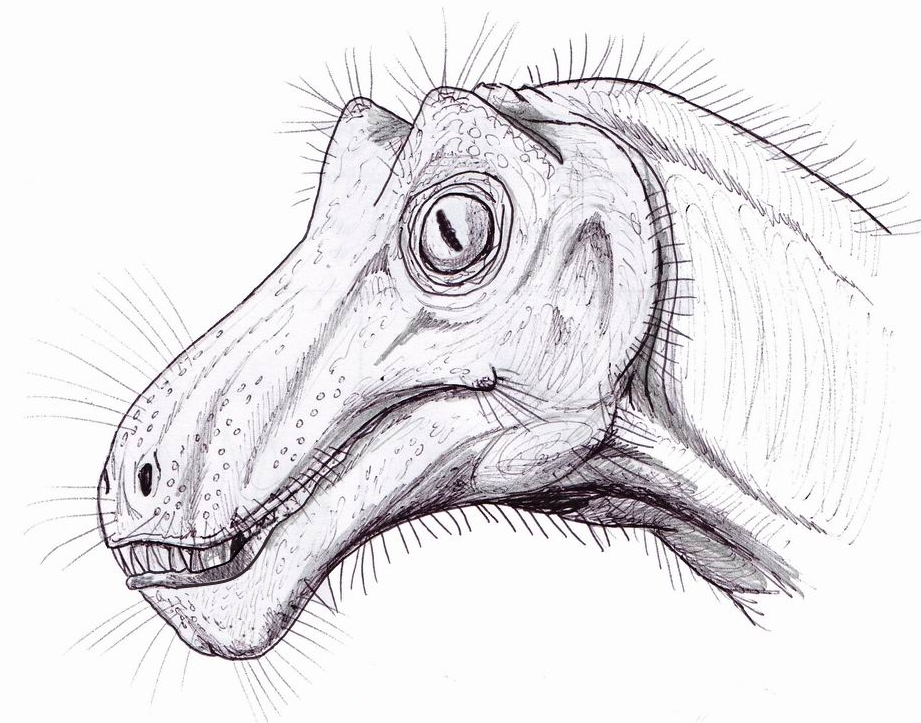
Lemurosaurus

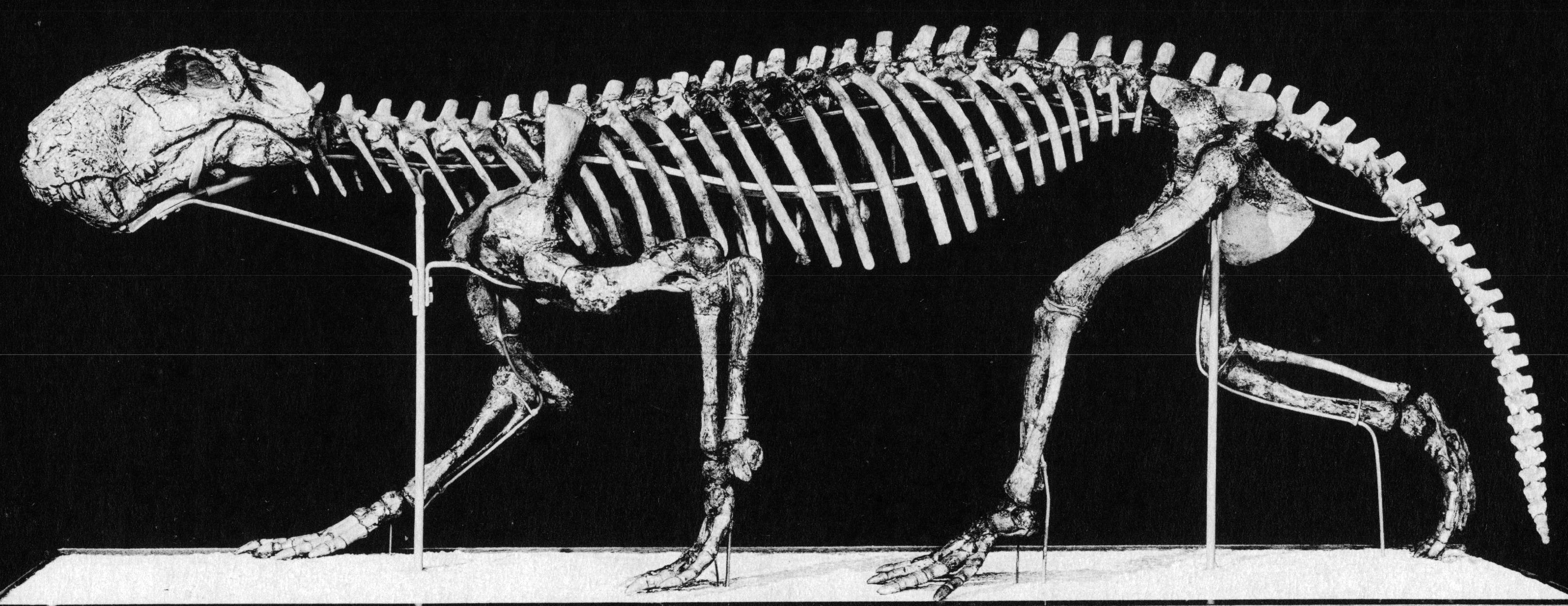
Lycaenops

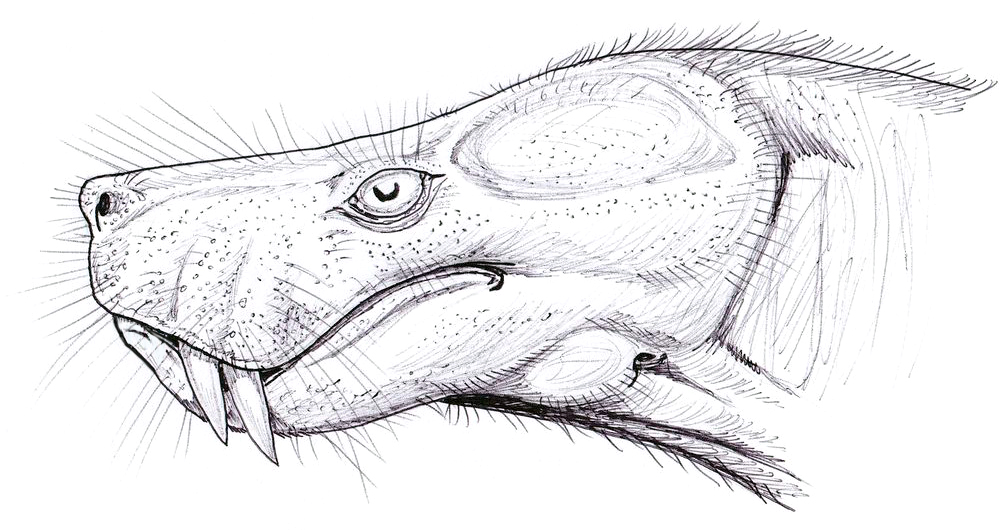
Lycosuchus

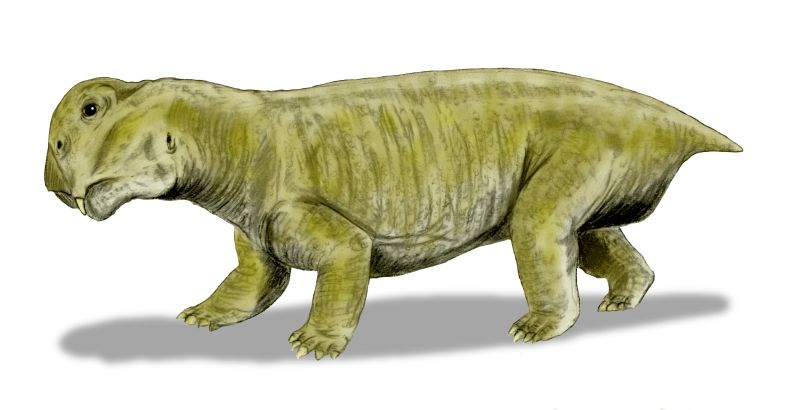
Lystrosaurus

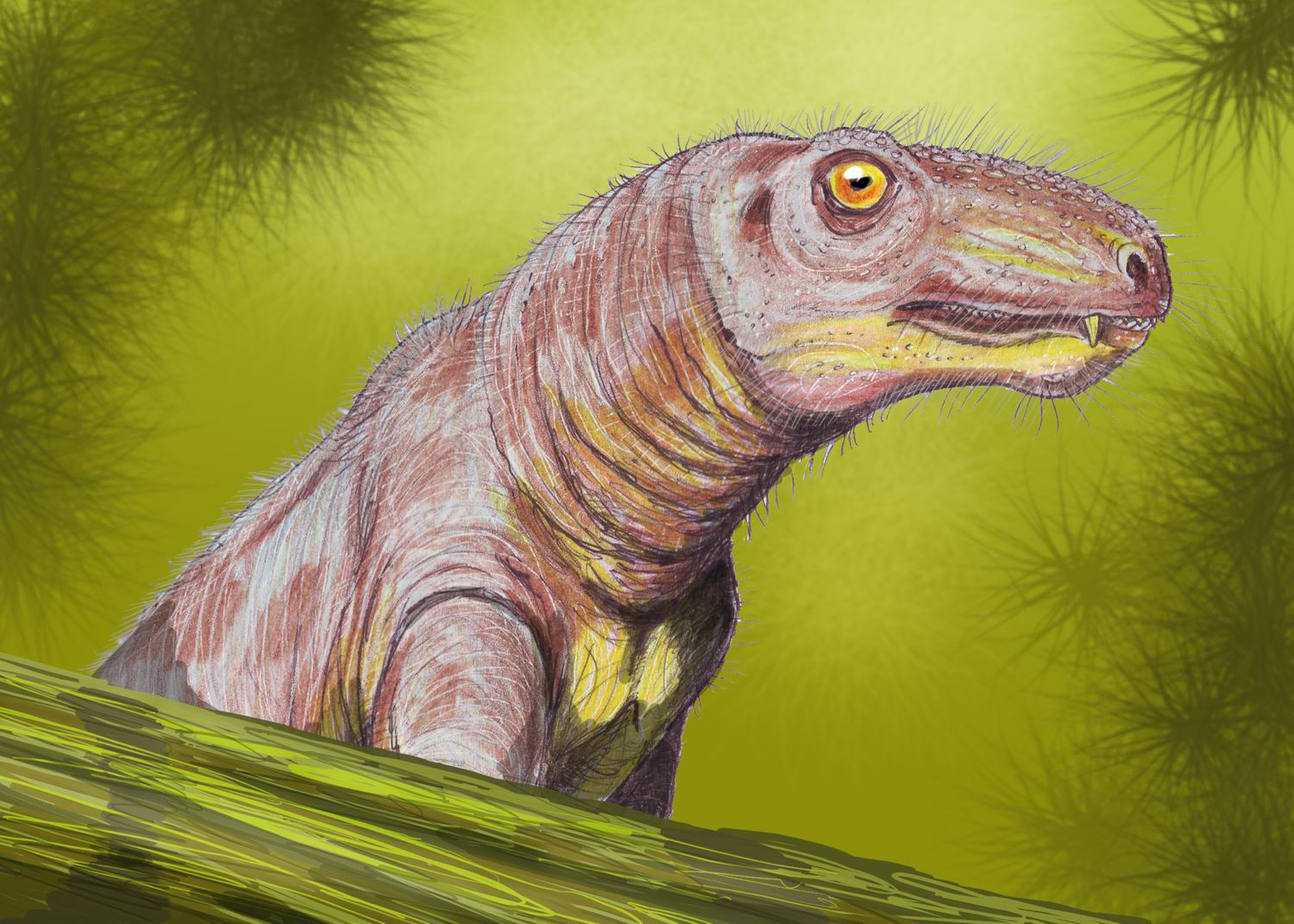
Microurania

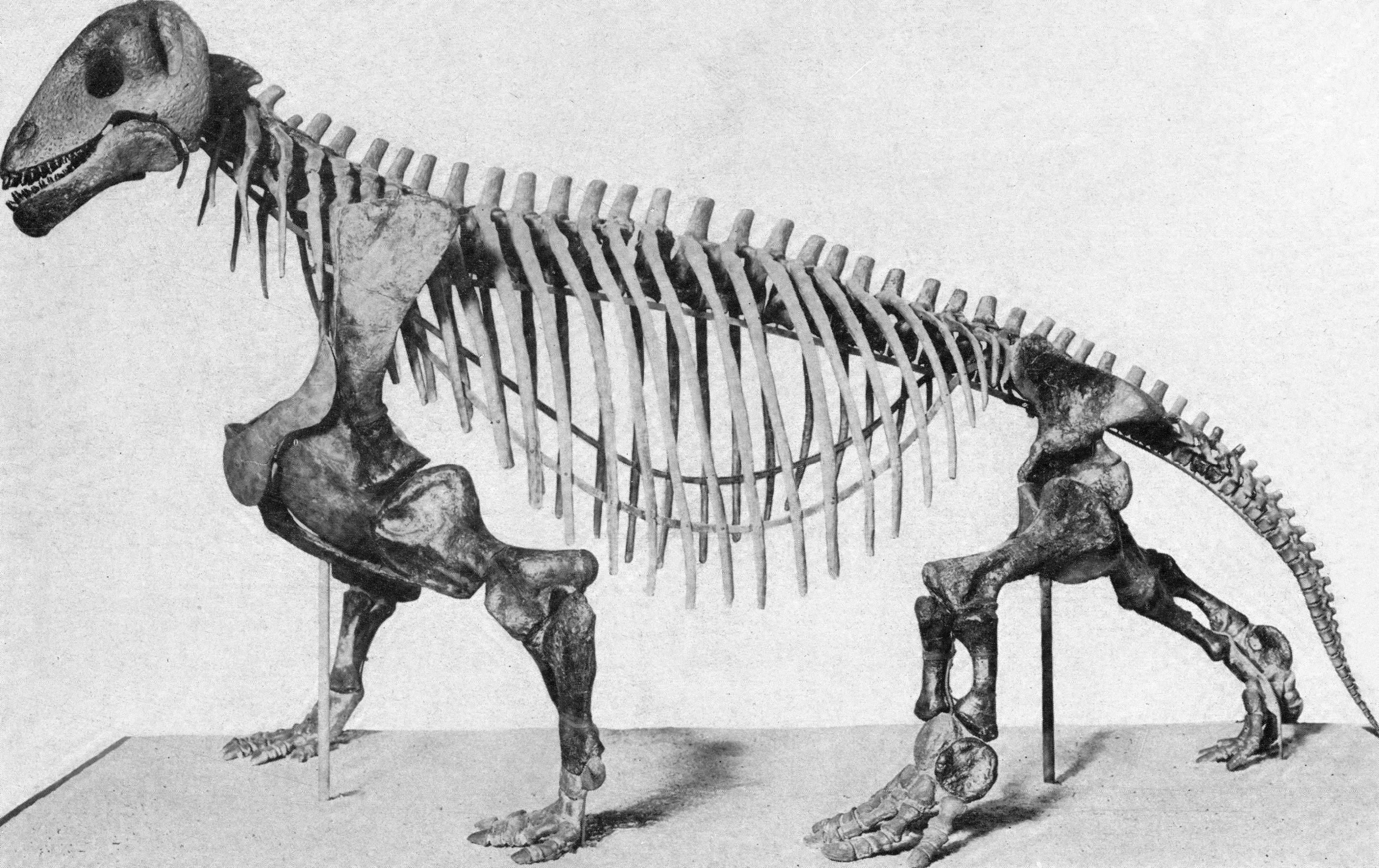
Moschops

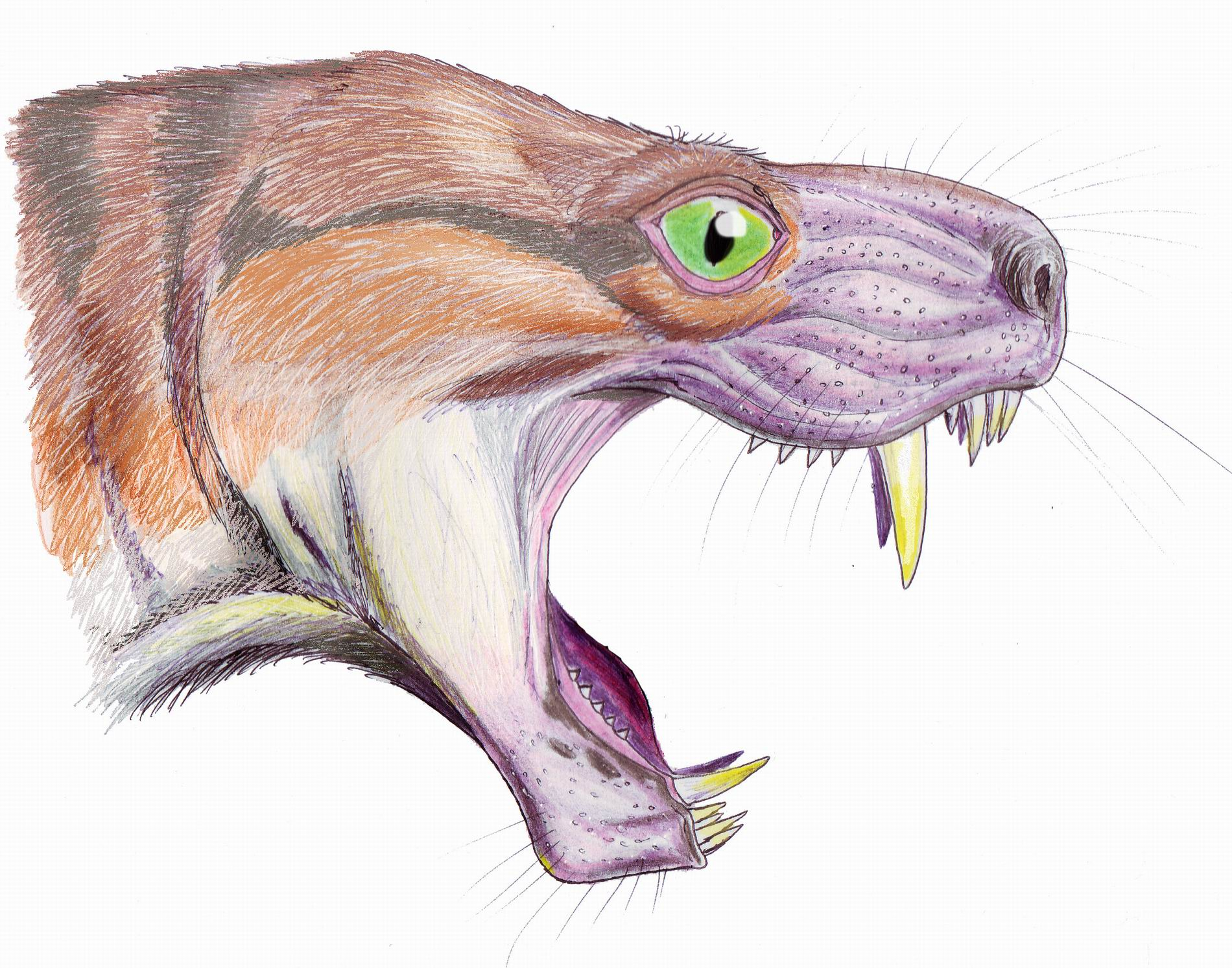
Moschorhinus

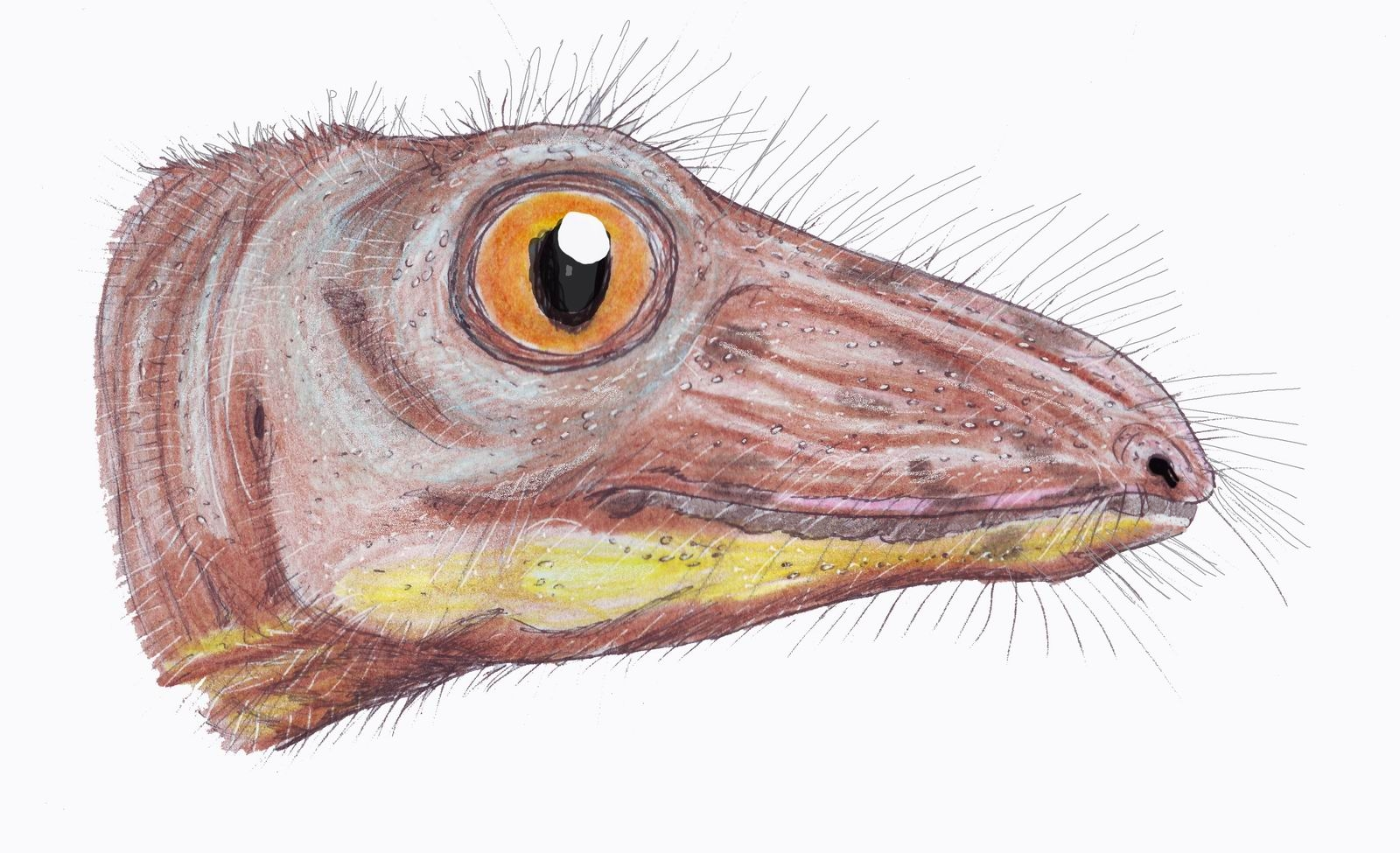
Nikkasaurus

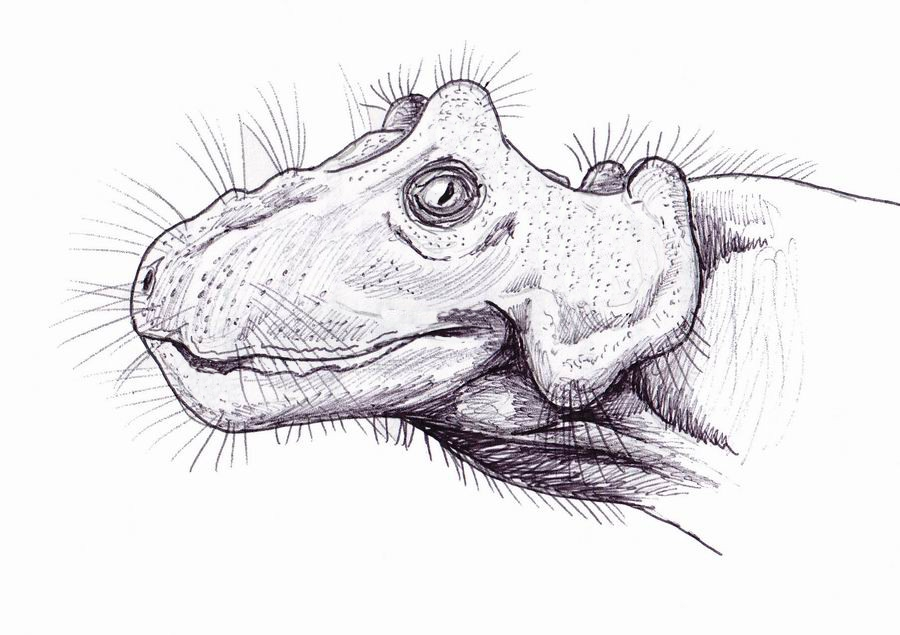
Paraburnetia

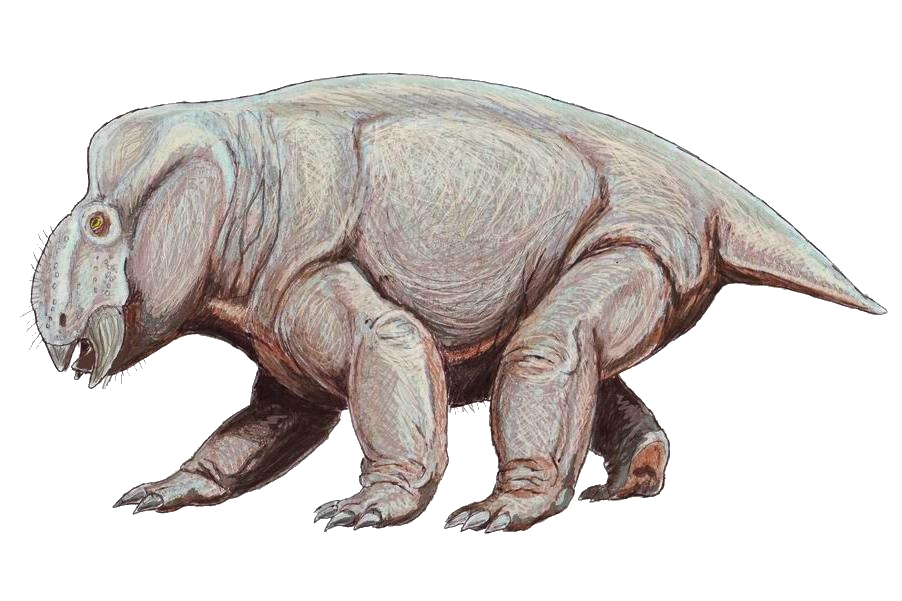
Placerias

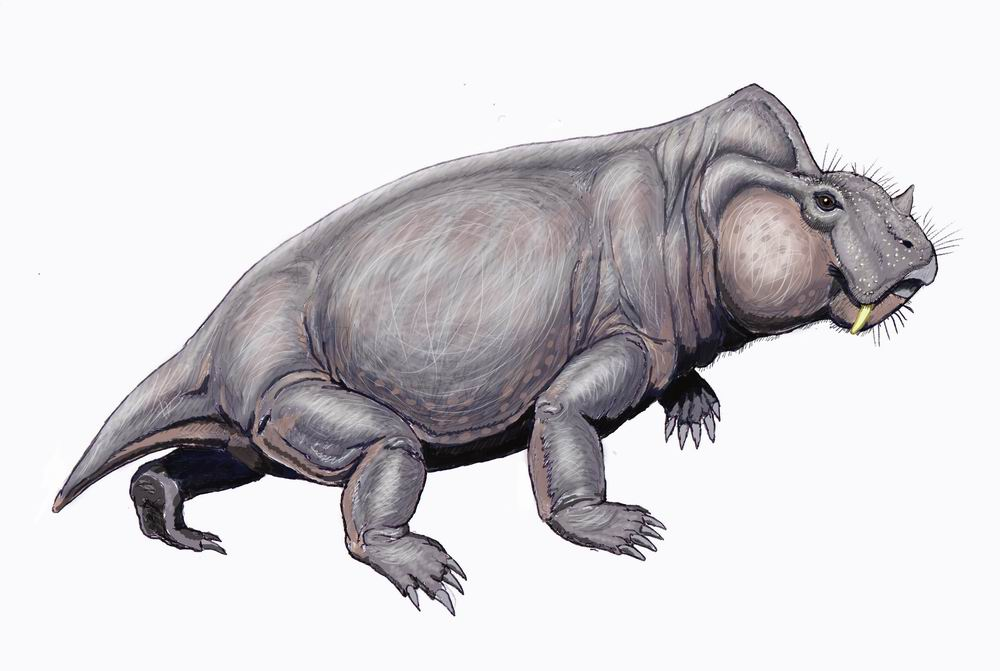
Rabidosaurus

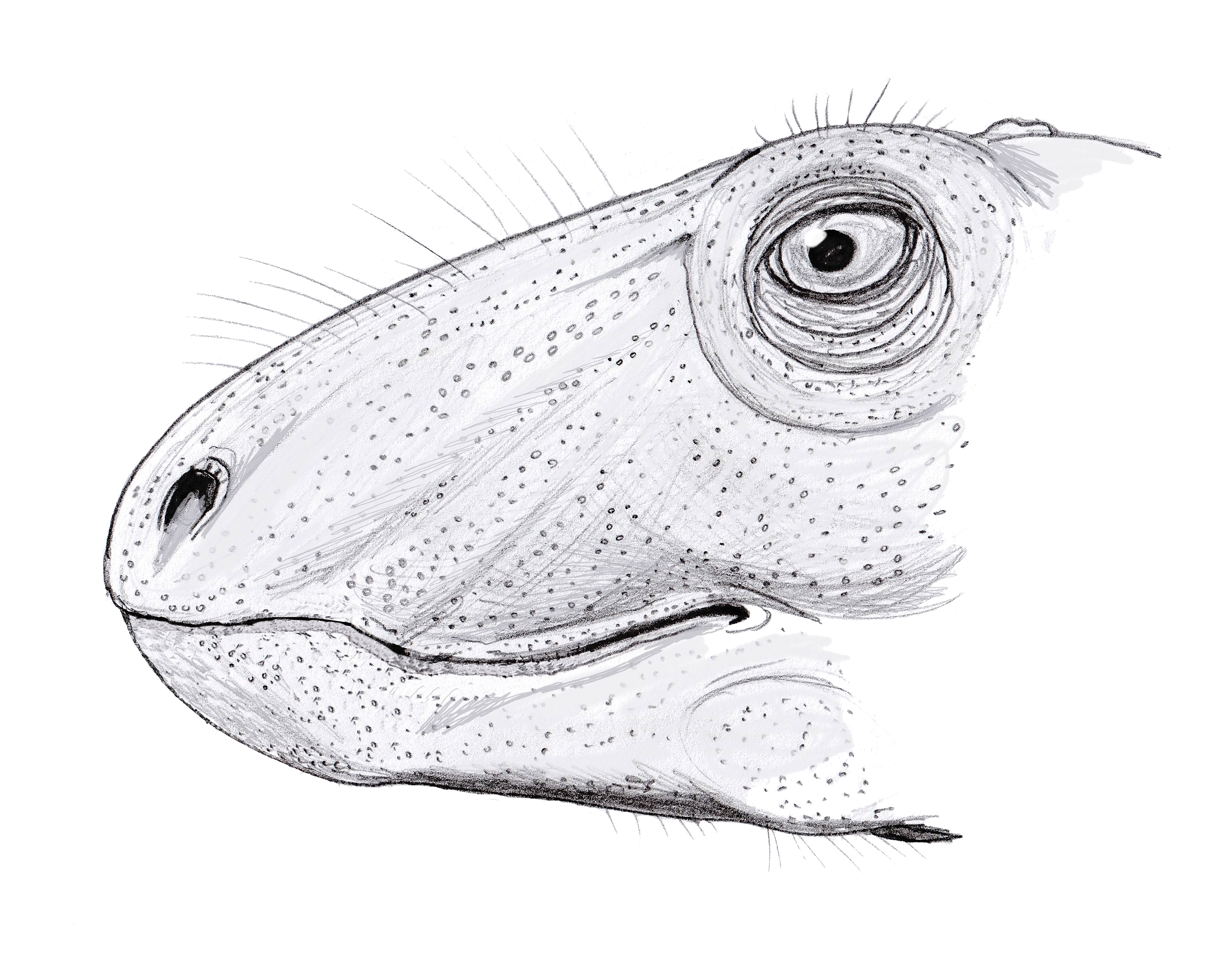
Raranimus

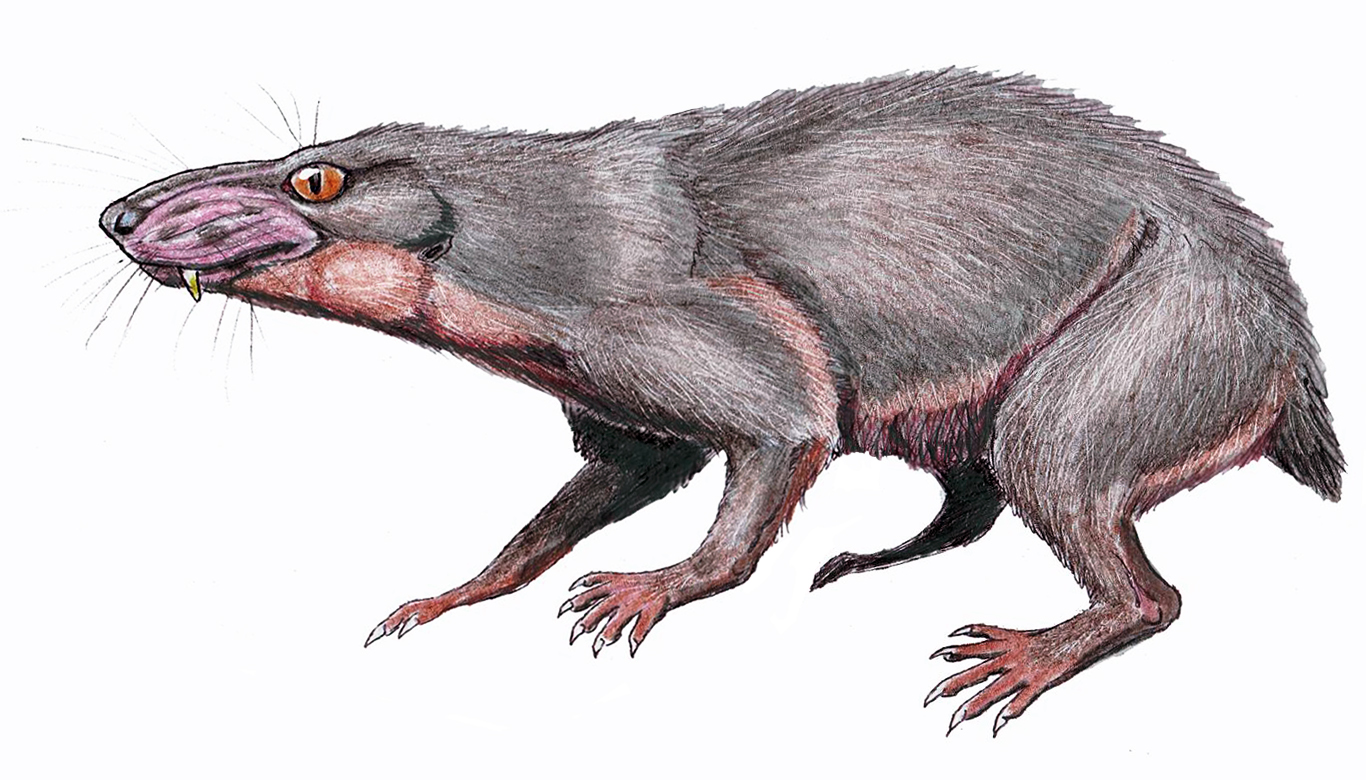
Regisaurus

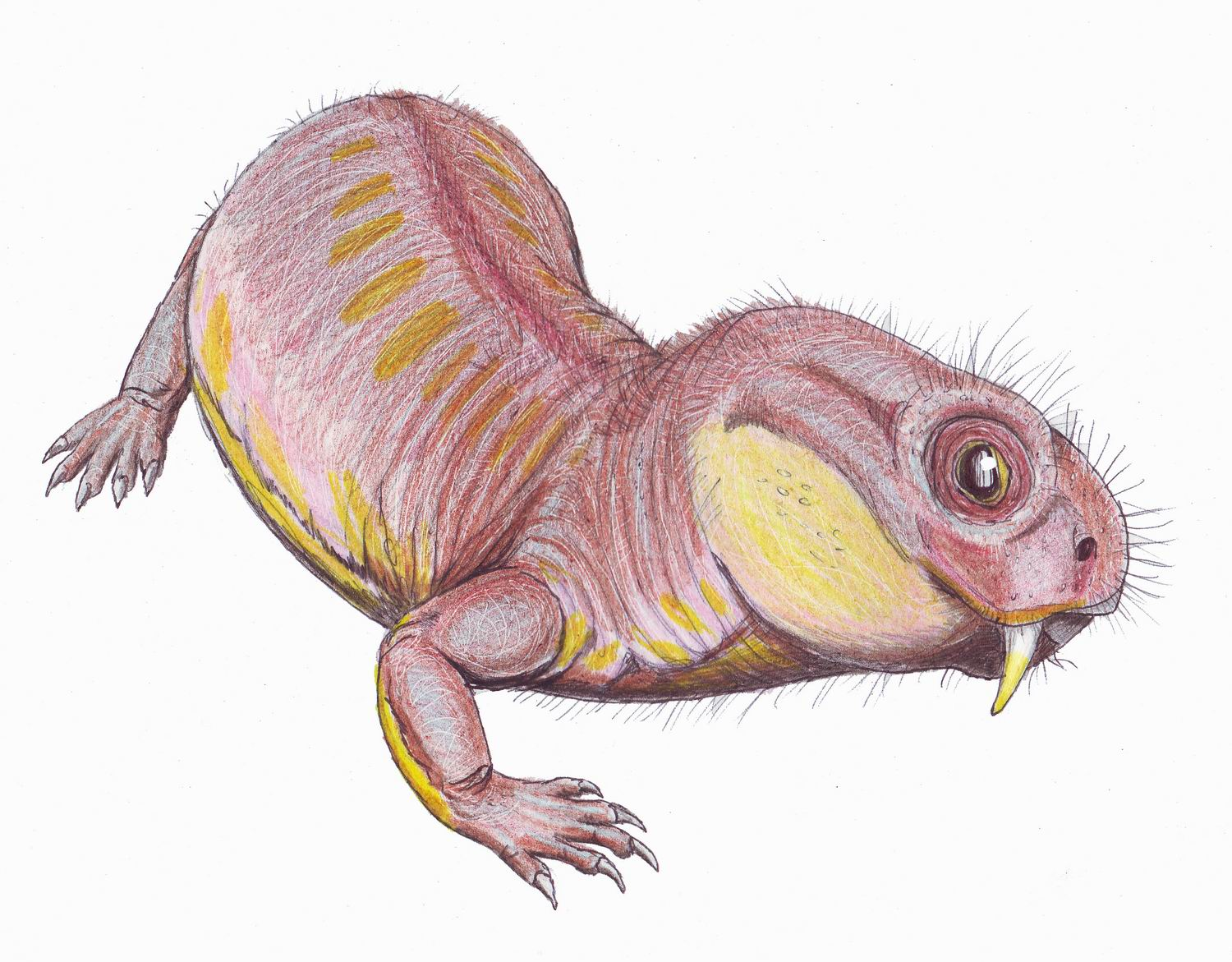
Robertia

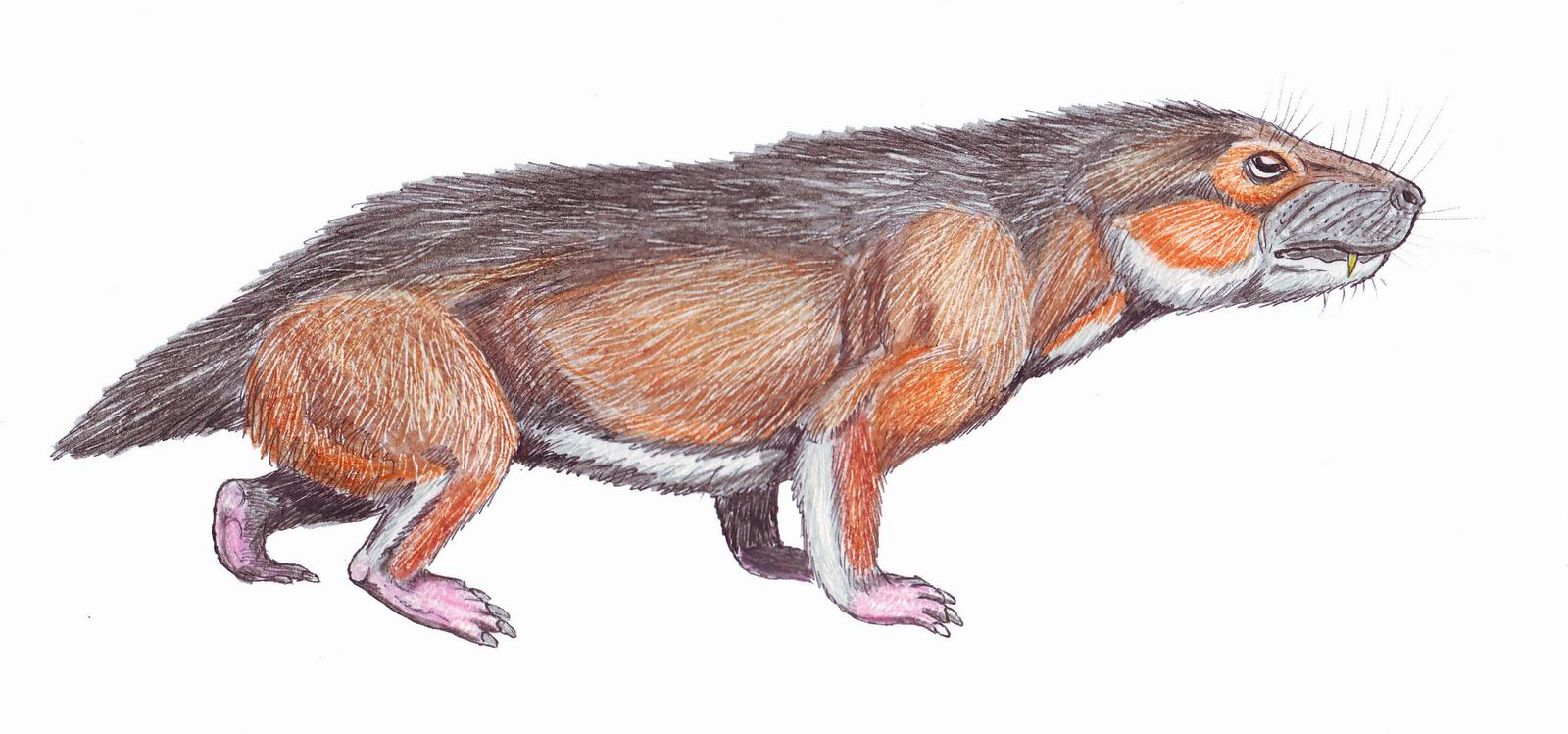
Sesamodon

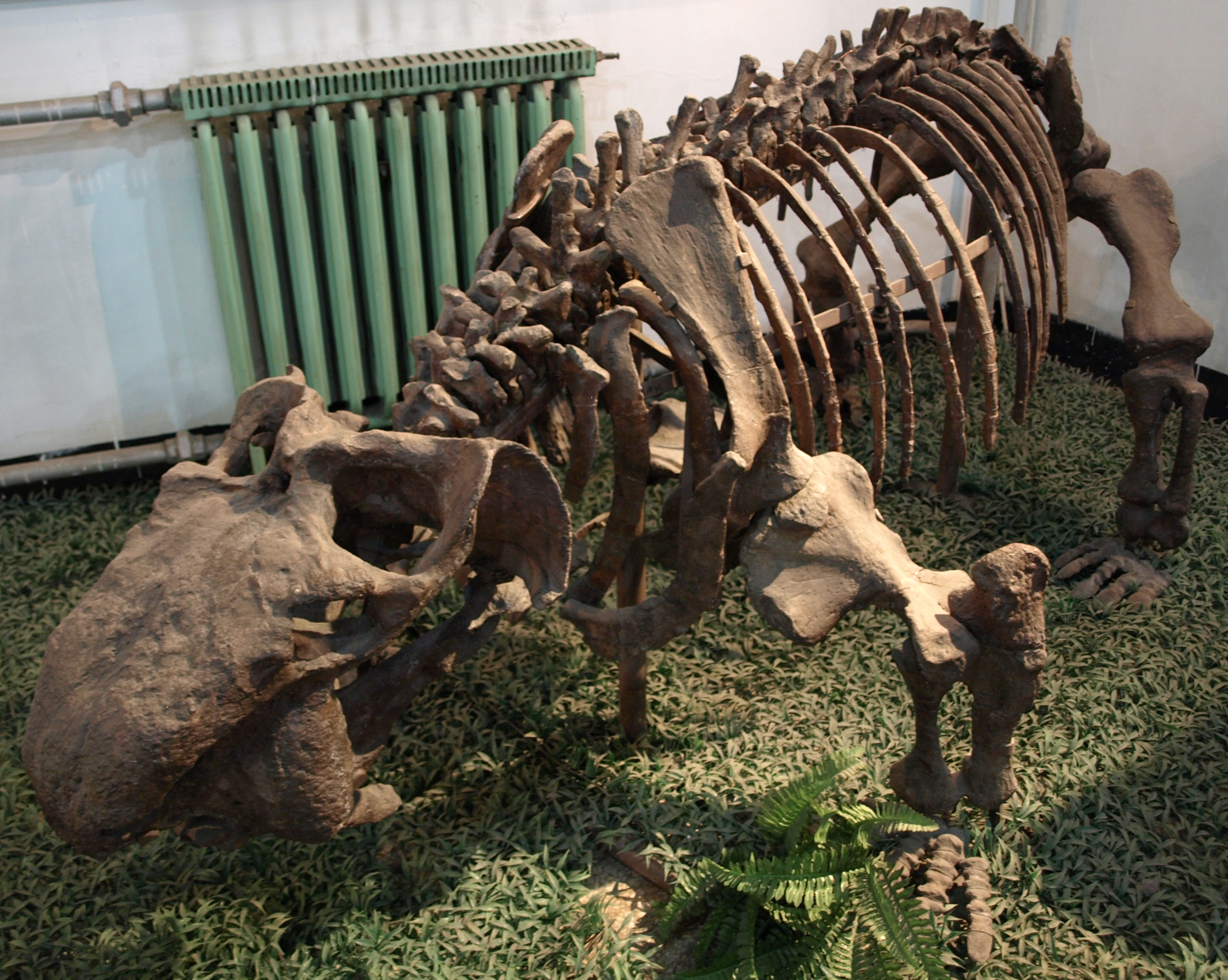
Sinokannemeyeria

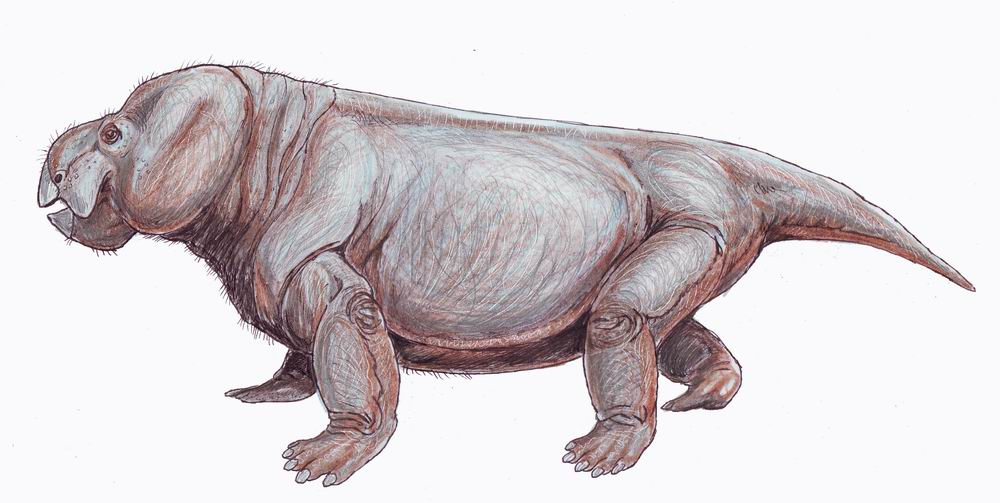
Stahleckeria

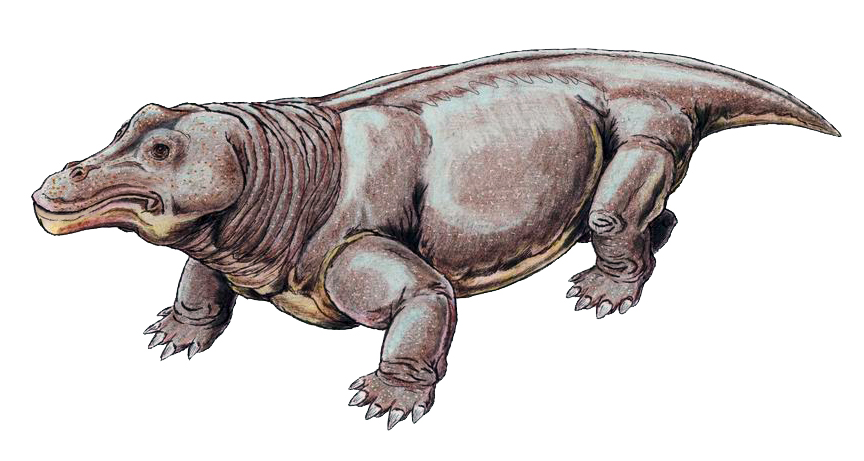
Struthiocephalus

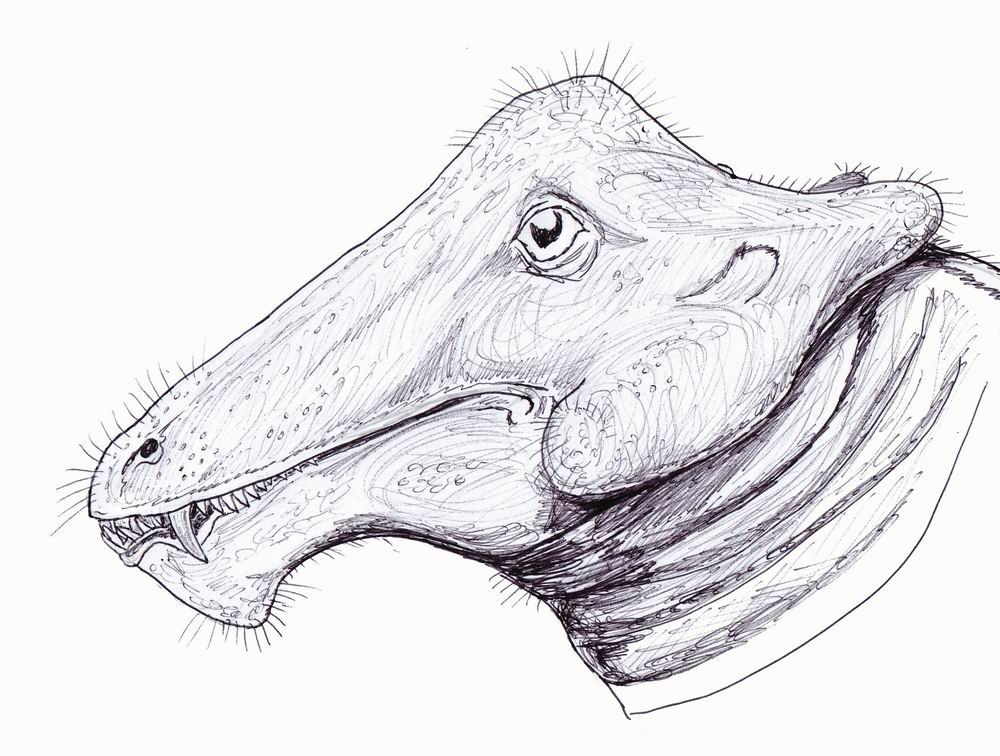
Styracocephalus

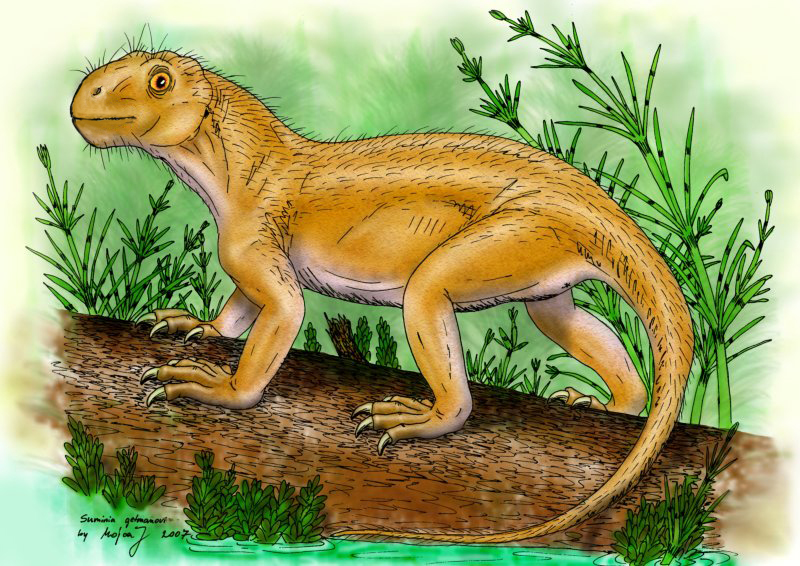
Suminia

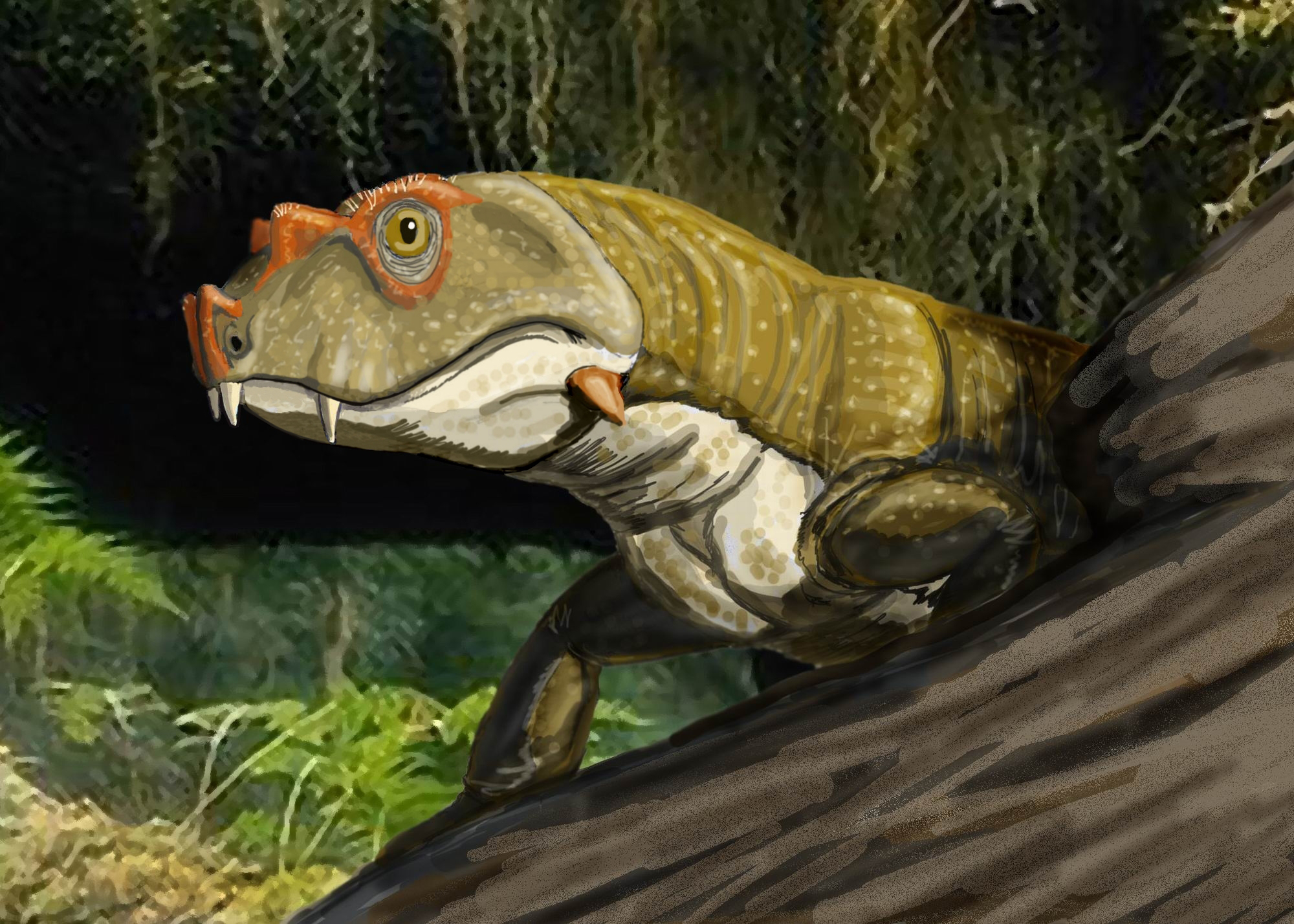
Tetraceratops

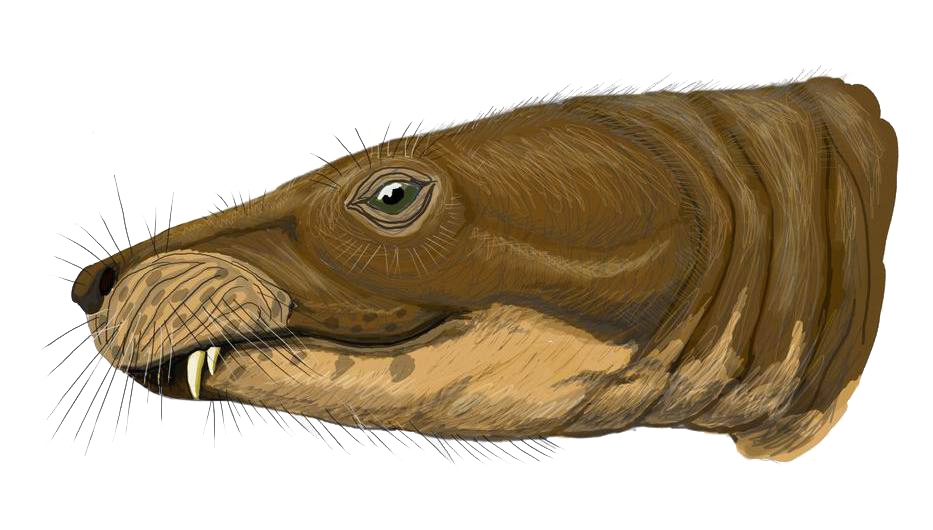
Theriognathus

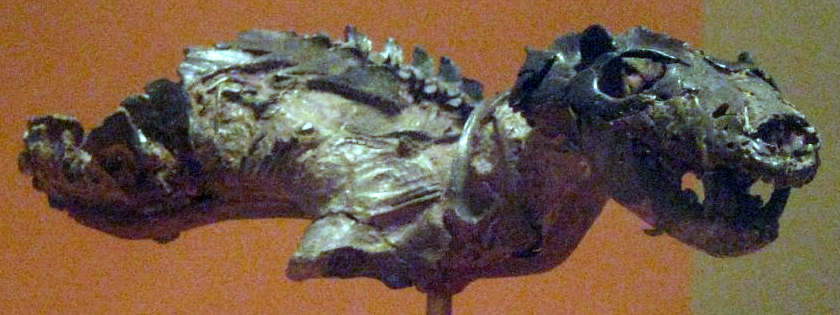
Thrinaxodon

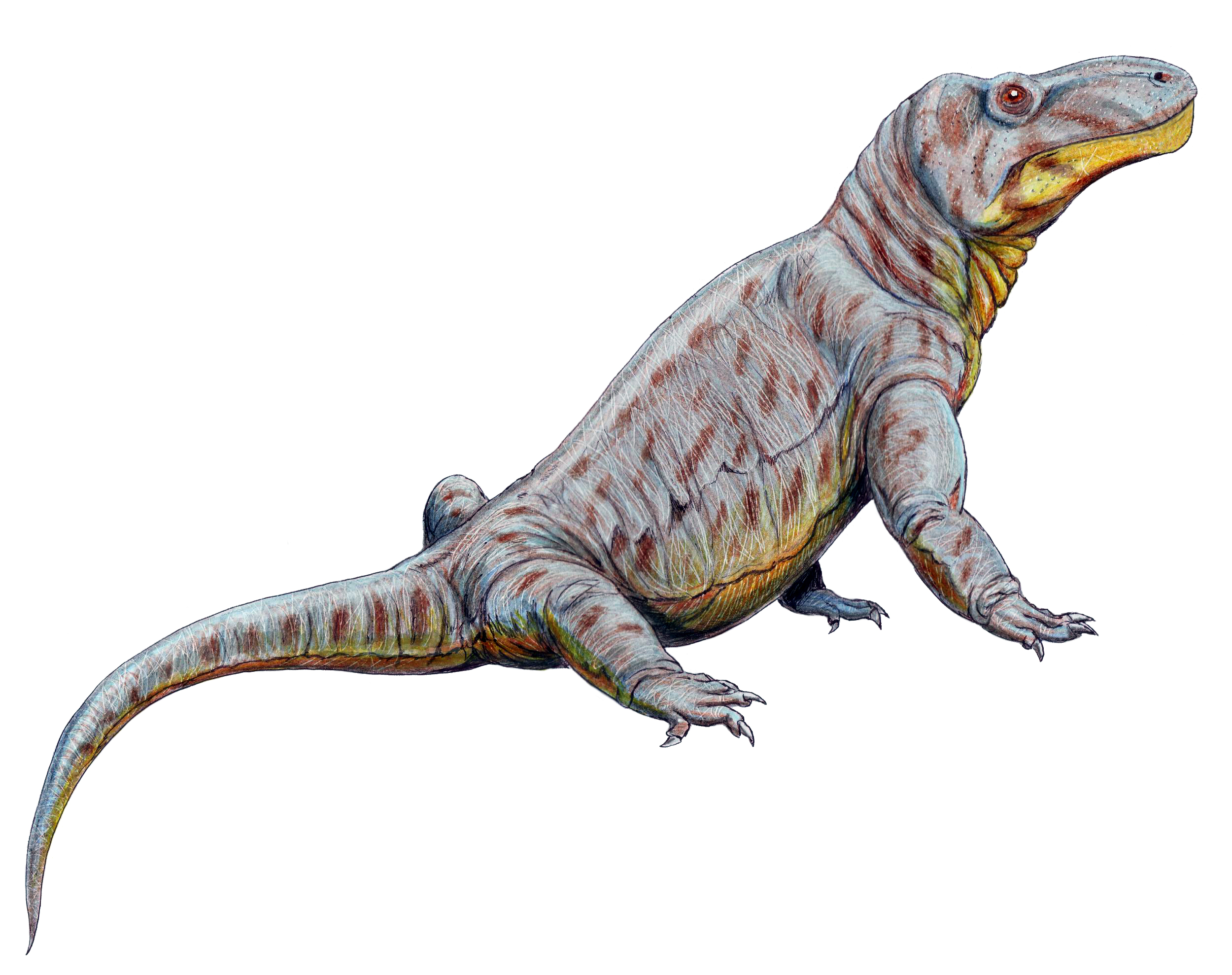
Titanosuchus

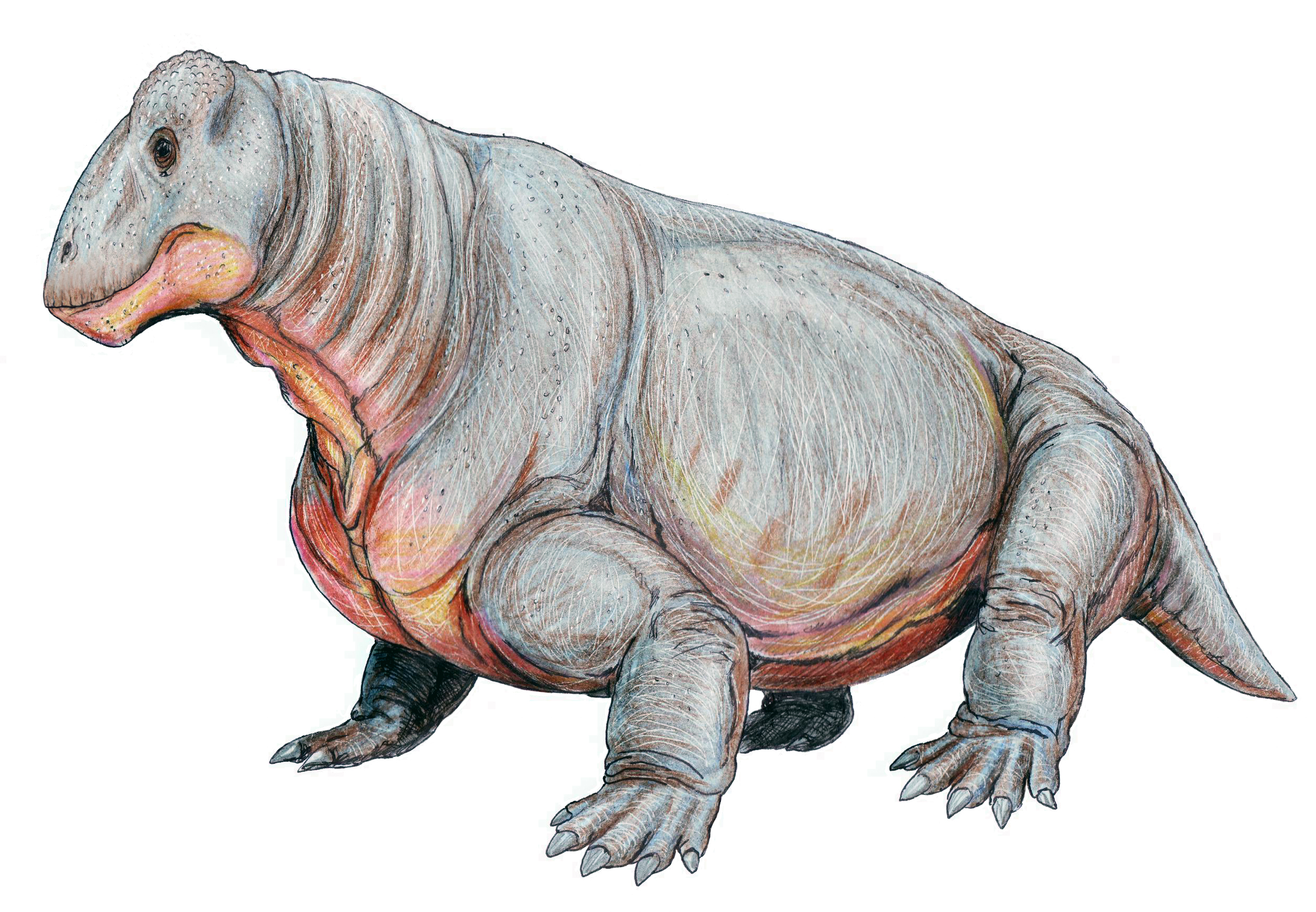
Ulemosaurus

== See also ==
- List of prehistoric mammals
- Synapsid
