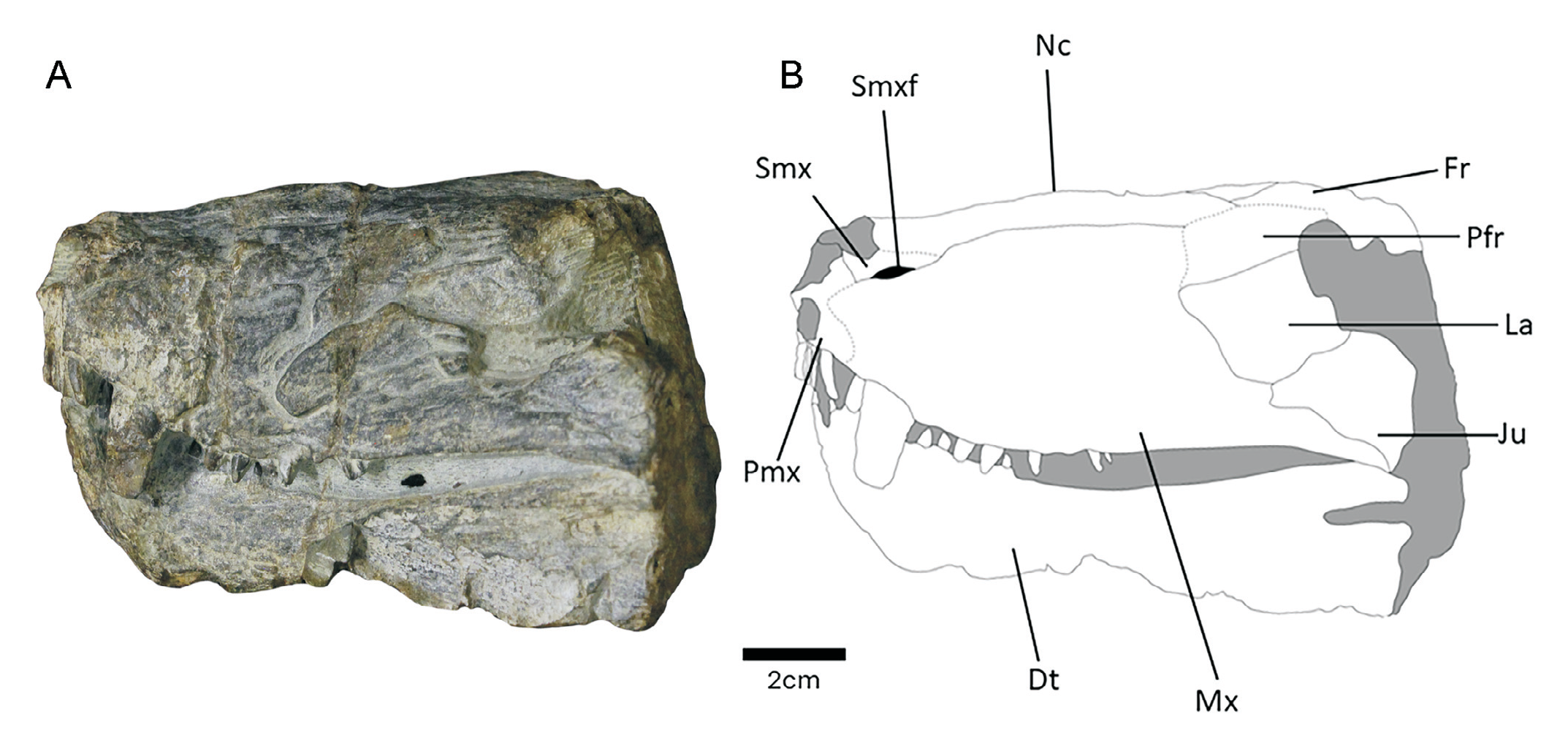
- Holotype skull

Scientific classification
- Kingdom: Animalia
- Phylum: Chordata
- Clade: Synapsida
- Clade: Therapsida
- Suborder: †Biarmosuchia
- Clade: †Burnetiamorpha
- Genus: †Impumlophantsi; Matlhaga, Benoit & Rubidge, 2024
- Species: †I. boonstrai

Binomial name
- †Impumlophantsi boonstrai Matlhaga, Benoit & Rubidge, 2024

= Impumlophantsi =

Impumlophantsi Temporal range: Permian (Guadalupian), ~261 Ma

Genus of extinct therapsids

Impumlophantsi (meaning "low nose") is an extinct genus of biarmosuchian therapsids from the Permian Abrahamskraal Formation (Beaufort Group) of South Africa. The genus contains a single species, I. boonstrai, known from a partial skull and fragmentary postcrania.

== Discovery and naming ==
The Impumlophantsi holotype specimen, SAM-PK-12118, was discovered in sediments of the Abrahamskraal Formation—a member of the Beaufort Group—on the Kruidfontein farm in Prince Albert, South Africa. The type locality represents the Diictodon-Styracocephalus Subzone of the Tapinocephalus Assemblage Zone. The specimen consists of the preorbital region of the skull and articulated lower jaw (SAM-PK12118a) and a partial vertebral column and pelvis (SAM-PK12118b).

In 1965, Lieuwe D. Boonstra partially described the postcranial remains, interpreting them as belong to a galesuchid gorgonopsian. His preparation techniques damaged the specimen, preventing later researchers from thoroughly observing the material, although the associated cranium was left largely untouched. Subsequent preparation of the remainder of the specimen revealed numerous features distinct from gorgonopsians, more consistent with biarmosuchians.

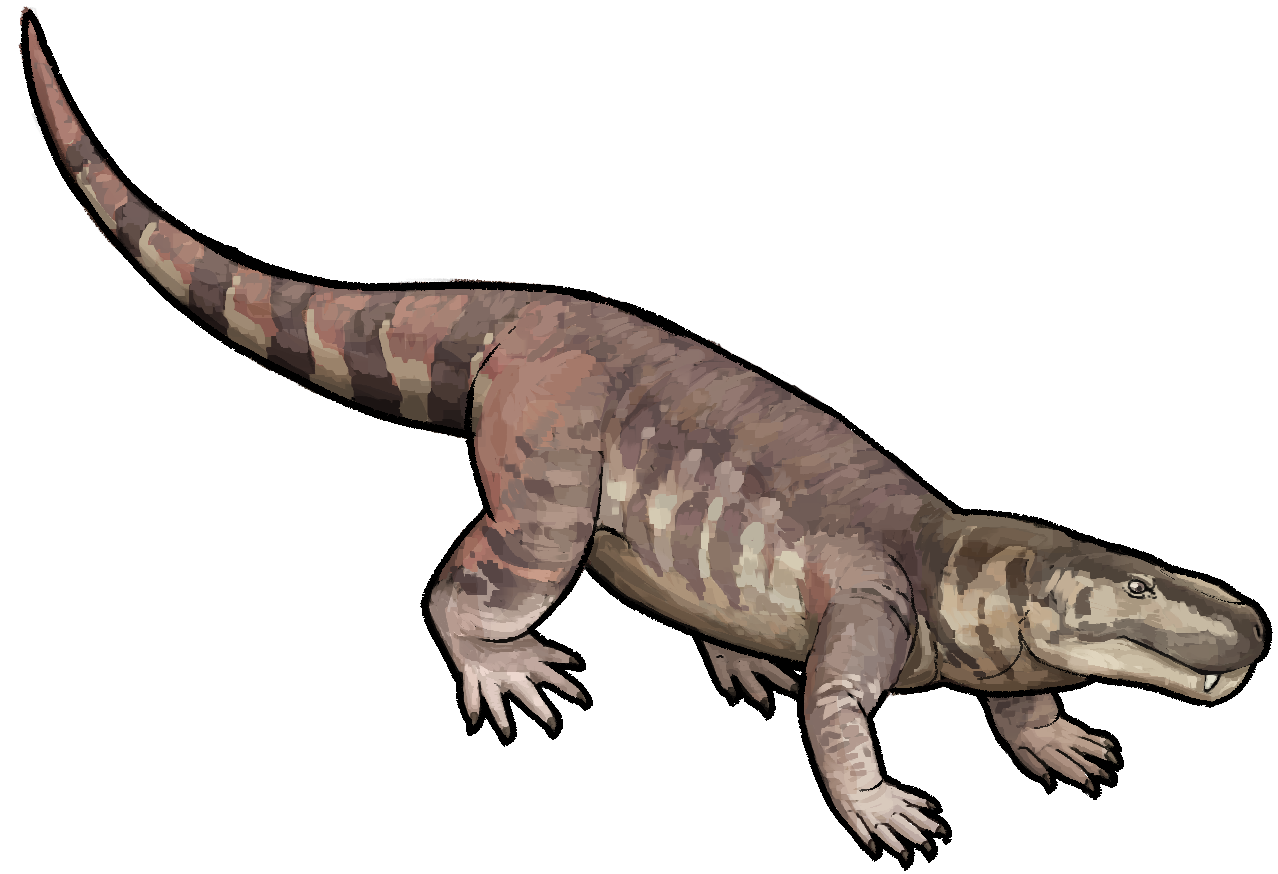
Life restoration

In 2024, Matlhaga, Benoit & Rubidge described Impumlophantsi boonstrai as a new genus and species of burnetiamorph biarmosuchians based on these fossil remains. The generic name, Impumlophantsi, means "low nose" in isiXhosa, referring to the notably inconspicuous nasal crest observed in the taxon. The specific name, boonstrai, honors L. D. Boonstra, the initial describer of the specimen and a prominent worker in the type locality.

== Classification ==
In their phylogenetic analyses, Matlhaga, Benoit & Rubidge (2024) recovered Impumlophantsi as a basal member of the biarmosuchian clade Burnetiamorpha. Their results are displayed in the cladogram below:

- Biarmosuchia
  - Biarmosuchus
  - - Hipposaurus
    - - RC20
      - - Ictidorhinus
        - Lycaenodon
        - Herpetoskylax
        - Burnetiamorpha
          - Impumlophantsi
          - - - Lophorhinus
              - Lemurosaurus
            - - Lobalopex
              - Burnetiidae
                - Isengops
                - Burnetiinae
                - Proburnetiinae
