= Teekloof Formation =

Geological formation in South Africa

- Stratigraphic range: Middle Permian; ~265–255 Ma
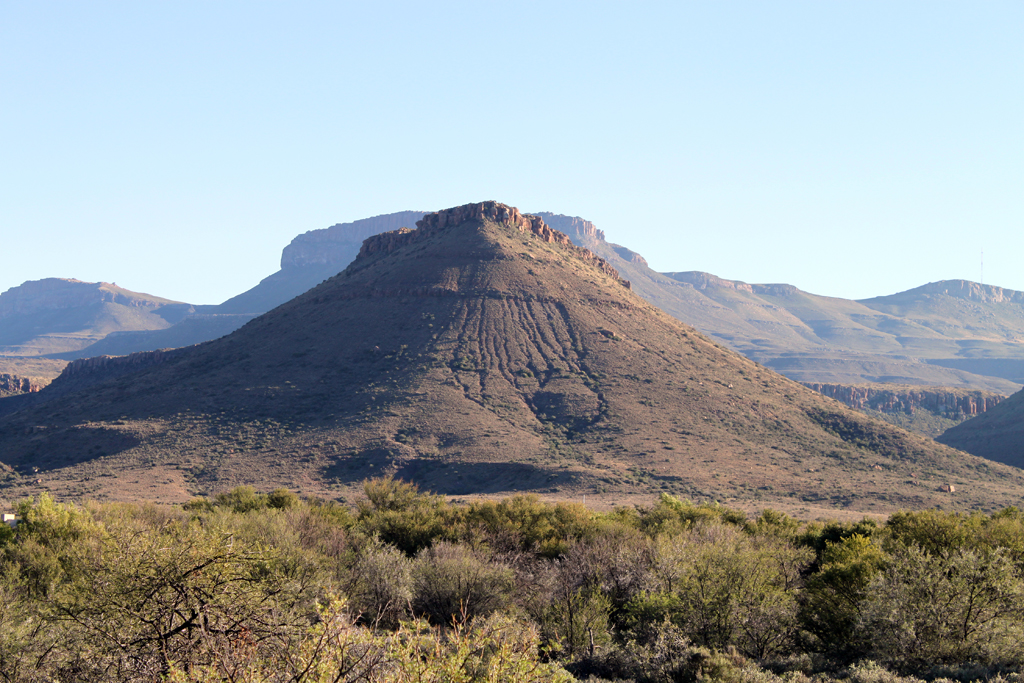
- Type: Geological formation
- Unit of: Adelaide Subgroup, Beaufort Group
- Overlies: Abrahamskraal Formation
- Thickness: up to 300 m (980 ft)

Lithology
- Primary: Mudstone, siltstone
- Other: Sandstone

Location
- Coordinates: 32.949°S 25.816°E
- Approximate paleocoordinates: 60.0°S 32.6°W
- Region: Western, Northern & Eastern Cape
- Country: South Africa

Type section
- Named for: Teekloof Pass
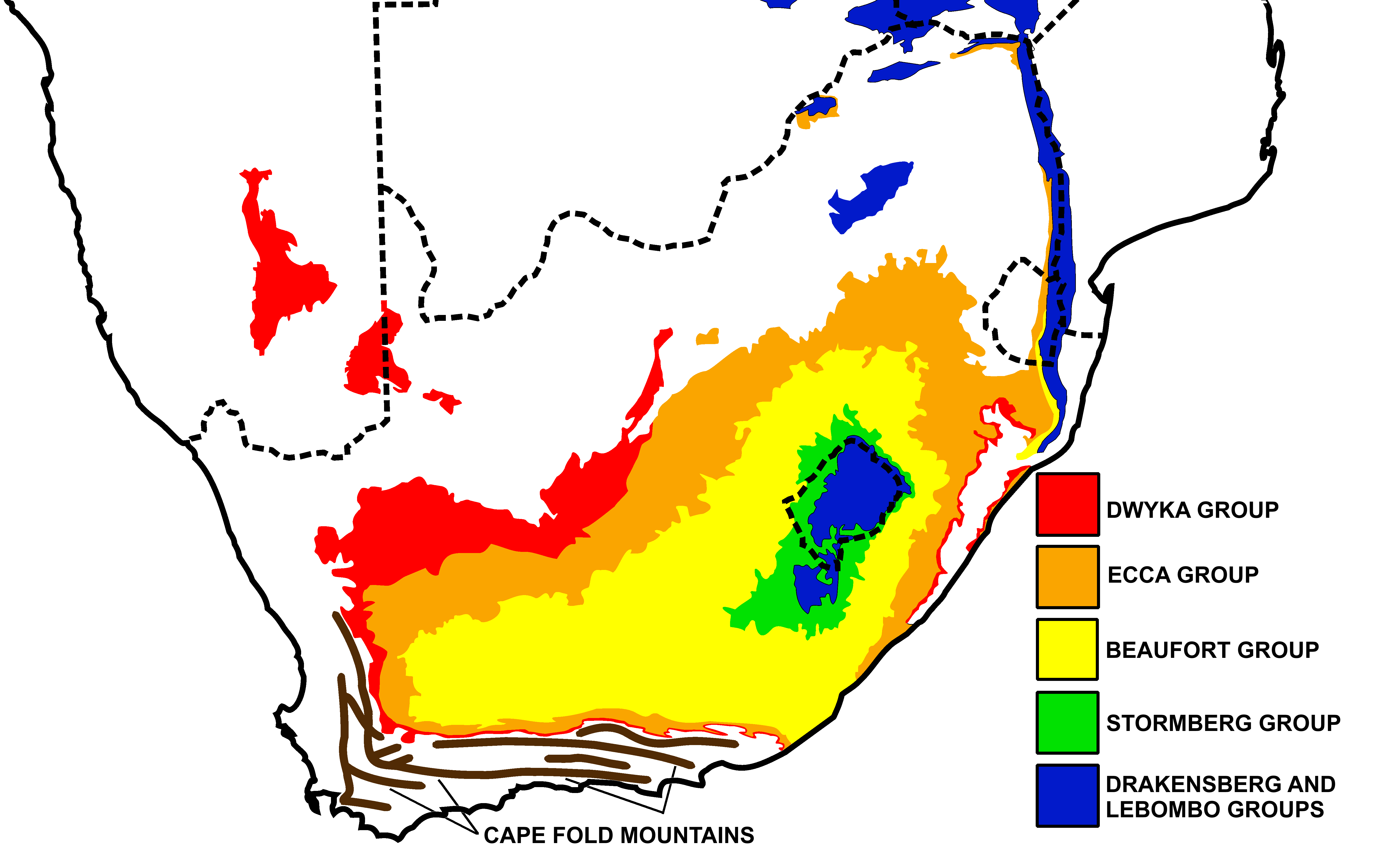

The Teekloof Formation is a geological formation that forms part of the Beaufort Group, one of the five geological groups that comprises the Karoo Supergroup in South Africa. The Teekloof Formation is the uppermost formation of Adelaide Subgroup deposits West of 24ºE and contains Middle to Late Permian-aged (Guadalupian to Lopingian) deposits and four biozones (Pristerognathus, Tropidostoma, Cistecephalus, and Daptocephalus assemblage zones) of the Beaufort Group. It overlies the Abrahamskraal Formation (the western correlate of the Middleton Formation). The Teekloof Formation does not underlie other units other than the younger Karoo dolerites and sills that relate to the emplacement of the Early Jurassic Drakensberg Group to the east. Outcrops and exposures of the Teekloof Formation range from Sutherland through the mountain escarpments between Fraserburg and Beaufort West. The northernmost localities of the Teekloof Formation are found by Loxton, Victoria West and Richmond.

== Geology ==
The Teekloof Formation overlies the Abrahamskraal Formation and is not capped by any other preserved sedimentation. Only East of 24ºE does the preservation of Beaufort Group rocks continue. There is no rock preservation in the western-southwestern portions of the Karoo Basin. It is unclear whether rock preservation there ceased in the Late Permian due to localized basinal tectonics, or if that rock material was preserved but later weathered away. The Teekloof Formation has five subdivisions or members which are listed below (from oldest to youngest):

- Poortjie Member - Correlates with the Lycosuchus - Eunotosaurus Subzone Endothiodon Assemblage Zone
- Hoedemaker Member - Correlates with the Tropidostoma - Gorgonops Subzone of the Endothiodon Assemblage Zone
- Oukloof Member - Correlates with the Cistecephalus Assemblage Zone
- Steenkampsvlakte Member - Correlates with the Daptocephalus Assemblage Zone
- Javanerskop Member - Correlates with the Daptocephalus Assemblage Zone

=== Lithologies ===
The sedimentary rocks of this formation are predominantly reddish or minor green mudstones that are either structureless, horizontally laminated, or medium to thickly bedded. Pedogenic and diagenetic carbonate nodules and also fossil gypsum rosettes occur in the mudstone deposits. Interbedded with the mudstone deposits are minor channel sandstones ranging from pale olive to greenish-grey in colour. The sandstones are fine to medium grained and preserve fining-upward sequences (e.g. from bottom to top: Massive, horizontally laminated, trough cross-bedded, and ripple cross-laminated sedimentary structures). In the uppermost sections of the Teekloof Formation, the Javanerskop Member contains ribbon-shaped, single storied sandstones. These sandstones in the uppermost sections contain numerous erosional surfaces lined with siltstone or mudstone pellet conglomerates.

Geologists consider the Teekloof Formation depositional environment to have been a floodplain facies association that underwent seasonal arid conditions and playa lake formation as indicated by the presence of fossil gypsum rosettes and carbonate nodules. The sandstone occurrences preserve evidence of deposition on point bars in a meandering river system. Seasonal waning flood level events are indicated by the fining upward sequences.

== Paleontology ==
The Teekloof Formation is rich in fossil material and is particularly renowned for its diverse therapsid fossil fauna. Plant and invertebrate trace fossils are also found as are some preserved vertebrate fossil trackways. Well-known trackways of the pareiasaur Bradysaurus, and therapsids Diictodon and Tapinocaninus have been found by the town Fraserburg.

=== Paleofauna ===
==== Synapsids ====
===== Biarmosuchia =====
Biarmosuchians of the Teekloof Formation
Taxa	Species	Locality	Member	Assemblage Zone	Material	Notes	Images
Lobalopex	L. mordax	Victoria West	Hoedemaker	Endothiodon AZ	A partial skull		Lobalopex Lophorhinus
Lophorhinus	L. willodenensis		Hoedemaker	Endothiodon AZ	The anterior half of a skull.	A Biarmosuchian	Lobalopex Lophorhinus

===== Therapsids =====
Color key: Taxon / Reclassified taxon / Taxon falsely reported as present / Dubious taxon or junior synonym / Ichnotaxon / Ootaxon / Morphotaxon

Notes
Uncertain or tentative taxa are in small text
~~crossed out~~ taxa are discredited.

====== Cynodontia ======
Cynodonts of the Teekloof Formation
Taxa	Species	Locality	Member	Assemblage Zone	Material	Notes	Images
Abdalodon	A. diastematicus	Leeukloof	Hoedemaker				Charassognathus Procynosuchus
Charassognathus	C. gracilis	Willodene Farm	Hoedemaker	Endothiodon AZ	A crushed skull, partial lower jaw, and a leg bone.	A charassognathidae cynodont	Charassognathus Procynosuchus
Cynosaurus	C. longiceps	Willodene Farm	Hoedemaker	Endothiodon AZ			Charassognathus Procynosuchus
Procynosuchus	P. delaharpeae	Matjiesfortien 412	Oukloof	Endothidon Az			Charassognathus Procynosuchus

====== Dicynodonts ======
Dicynodonts of the Teekloof Formation
Taxa	Species	Locality	Member	Assemblage Zone	Material	Notes	Images
Bulbasaurus	B. phylloxyron	Vredelus	Hoedemaker	Endothiodon AZ	A skull	A geikiidae dicynodont	
Cistecephalus	C. microrhinus	Matjiesfortein 412	Oukloof/Steenkamp	Endothiodon AZ		A dicynodont	
Diictodon	D. feliceps	Leeukloof and Amandelboom Farm		Endothiodon AZ		A dicynodont	
Endothiodon	E. bathystoma	Amandelboom Farm	Poortjie	Endothiodon AZ		A dicynodont	
Emydops	E. arctatus	Willodene Farm	Hoedemaker	Endothiodon AZ		A dicynodont	
Palemydops	P. minor	Leeukloof		Endothiodon AZ		A emydopidae dicynodont	
Pristerodon	P. mackayi	Leeukloof	Hoedemaker	Endothiodon AZ		A dicynodont	
Pristerodon	P. mirus	Leeukloof	Hoedemaker	Endothiodon AZ		A dicynodont	
Oudenodon	O. bainii	Willodene Farm	Hoedemaker	Endothiodon AZ		A dicynodont	
Rhachiocephalus	R. magnus						
Tropidostoma	T. dubium	Willodene Farm	Hoedemaker	Endothiodon AZ		A dicynodont	

====== Dinocephalian ======
Therocephalians of the Teekloof Formation
Taxa	Species	Locality	Member	Assemblage Zone	Material	Notes	Images
Criocephalosaurus	C. sp	Putfortien	Poortjie	Endothiodon AZ	Two new partial skull specimens	A tapinocephalian	

====== Therocephalia ======
Therocephalians of the Teekloof Formation
Taxa	Species	Locality	Member	Assemblage Zone	Material	Notes	Images
Alopecorhinus	A. parvidens		Poortjie				
Ictidognathus	I. hemburyi		Poortjie				
Microwhaitsia	M. mendrezi		Hoedemaker				
Mirotenthes	M. digitipes		Oukloof				
Ophidostoma	O. tatarinovi		Oukloof				
Scylacoides	S. ferox						

==== Reptiles ====
Reptiles of the Teekloof Formation
Taxa	Species	Locality	Member	Assemblage Zone	Material	Notes	Images
Saurorictus	S. australis	Leeukloof 43	Hoedemaker	Endothiodon AZ	A partial skull	A captorhinid	
Scyllacerta	S. creanae	Leeukloof 43	Hoedemaker	Endothiodon AZ	An aggregation comprising at least six individuals, four of which have articulated skull.	A younginid	
Pareiasaurus	P. serridens	Leeukloof				A pareiasaur	
