= Cistecephalus Assemblage Zone =

Permian biozone in South Africa

- Stratigraphic range: Late Permian; ~257.5–254.5 Ma
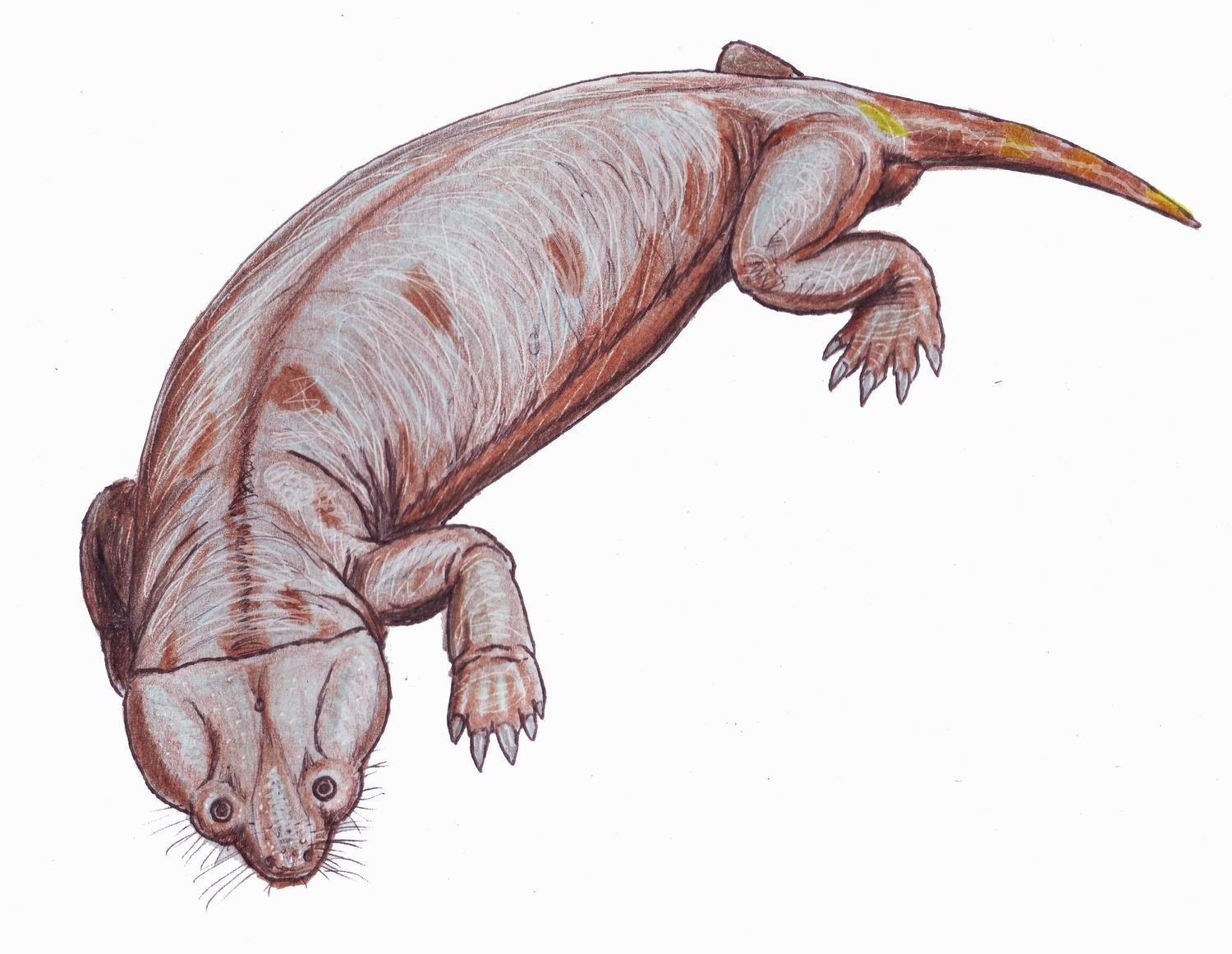
- Cistecephalus microrhinus
- Type: Biozone
- Unit of: Beaufort Group within Adelaide Supgroup
- Sub-units: Middle Teekloof Formation west of 24°E; Uppermost Middleton Formation & lowermost Balfour Formation east of 24°E
- Underlies: Daptocephalus Assemblage Zone
- Overlies: Endothiodon Assemblage Zone
- Thickness: up to 984.252 ft (300.000 m)

Location
- Region: Eastern, Northern & Western Cape
- Country: South Africa
- Extent: Karoo Basin

Type section
- Named for: Cistecephalus
- Named by: Robert Broom
- Year defined: 1906, 1909

The Cistecephalus Assemblage Zone is a tetrapod assemblage zone or biozone found in the Adelaide Subgroup of the Beaufort Group, a majorly fossiliferous and geologically important geological group of the Karoo Supergroup in South Africa. This biozone has outcrops located in the Teekloof Formation north-west of Beaufort West in the Western Cape, in the upper Middleton and lower Balfour Formations respectively from Colesberg of the Northern Cape to east of Graaff-Reinet in the Eastern Cape. The Cistecephalus Assemblage Zone is one of eight biozones found in the Beaufort Group, and is considered to be Late Permian in age.

The name of the biozone refers to Cistecephalus, a small, burrowing dicynodont therapsid. It is characterized by the presence of this species, known especially from the upper sections of this biozone, and the first appearance of the dicynodont Aulacephalodon.

== History ==
The first fossils to be found in the Beaufort Group rocks that encompass the current eight biozones were discovered by Andrew Geddes Bain in 1856. However, it was not until 1892 that it was observed that the geological strata of the Beaufort Group could be differentiated based on their fossil taxa. The initial undertaking was done by Harry Govier Seeley who subdivided the Beaufort Group into three biozones, which he named (from oldest to youngest):

- Zone of "Pareiasaurians"
- Zone of "Dicynodonts"
- Zone of "highly specialized group of theriodonts"

These proposed biozones Seeley named were subdivided further by Robert Broom between 1906 and 1909. Broom proposed the following biozones (from oldest to youngest):

- Pareiasaurus beds
- Endothiodon beds
- Kistecephalus beds
- Lystrosaurus beds
- Procolophon beds
- Cynognathus beds

These biozone divisions were approved by paleontologists of the time and were left largely unchanged for several decades. The Cistecephalus Assemblage Zone was coined by Robert Broom in 1906, where Broom referred to the rock layers Cistecephalus fossils were found in as the "Kistecephalus beds". The biozone was originally assigned to a far more broader stratigraphic range between the uppermost occurrence of Endothiodon and the lowermost of Lystrosaurus. Decades later, James Kitching revised the biostratigraphic ranges of the Beaufort Group. Kitching observed that Cistecephalus fossils were most abundant in a narrow band at the very top of the biozone. He named this area the "Cistecephalus acme zone" or "Cistecephalus Band". Later, researchers sought to redefine the biozone again as Cistecephalus fossils are extremely rare apart from the uppermost portion. It was suggested that, due to the biozone containing the first appearance of Aulacephalodon and its fossils being found throughout, the biozone should be renamed to the Aulacephalodon Assemblage Zone. The biozone was then, for a brief time, renamed the Aulacephalodon-Cistecephalus Assemblage Zone. However, due to the biozone first being named after Cistecephalus, the initial nomenclature of the biozone later overruled its renaming on historical grounds.

== Lithology ==
The Cistecephalus Assemblage Zone is located in the lower portion of the Teekloof Formation west of 24°E, in the upper Middleton Formation and lower Balfour Formation east of 24°E. These formations all fall within the Adelaide Subgroup of the Beaufort Group, sediments of which were formed in a large retroarc foreland basin in southwestern Gondwana. The sedimentary rocks are mainly sandstone, mudrock layers containing mudstone, siltstone, and fine sandstone. The sandstones are thought to have been deposited in broad alluvial plains where low-sinuosity streams flowed, while the mudrock accumulated on the floodplains that flanked these streams.

The majority of the fossils in the biozone are found in these interchannel mudrock layers as animal remains that came to rest on the floodplains were quickly buried by alluvial sediments washed downstream. Articulated fossils are not commonly found. However, isolated skulls are fairly common and are usually found encased in calcareous nodules. Fossils not encased in nodules are often fragmented. In addition, Jurassic-aged dolerite sheet and dike intrusions into the Beaufort Group have affected the uniformity in colour and texture of the biozone rocks in areas. This includes the colour of the fossilized bones, which range from a smooth, white appearance to being nearly black depending on their proximity to the dolerite intrusions.

== Paleontology ==
The Cistecephalus biozone is well known for its diversity of fossil fauna, especially of therapsid species. It is arranged into lower and upper zones due to the appearance or frequency of certain fossils. The lower zones are characterized by the first appearance of the dicynodont species Aulacephalodon and Oudenodon. Other species found are the Biarmosuchian therapsid Herpetoskylax, Burnetiamorph species namely Lemurosaurus, and numerous Gorgonopsian species such as Lycaenops, Rubidgea, and Dinogorgon. In addition species of Dicynodonts such as Endothiodon and Diictodon, Therocephalians, Pareiasaurs, and rare occurrences of parareptiles such as Owenetta and Milleretta have been found in the upper zones. The temnospondyl amphibian Rhinesuchus, and some fish and plant species have also been found. A dicynodont track way is also known in an outcrop of the biozone east of Graaff-Reinet. Cistecephalus fossils are rare until the uppermost portion of the biozone where the "Cistecephalus Band" is located.

== Correlations ==
Correlations in biostratigraphy have been made with the Cistecephalus zone to geological formations outside of South Africa. An Endothiodon snout was discovered in the Rio do Rasto Formation in Brazil, and fossils similar to the Cistecephalus zone have been found in Madumabisa Mudstone in Zambia. Recently, a new cistecephalid dicynodont was discovered in the Kundaram Formation of the Pranhita-Godavari Valley in India. The zone also correlates with the Malokinelskaya and Vyazovskaya Formations of Russia.

== See also ==
- List of fossiliferous stratigraphic units in South Africa
- Geology of South Africa
- Fremouw Formation
