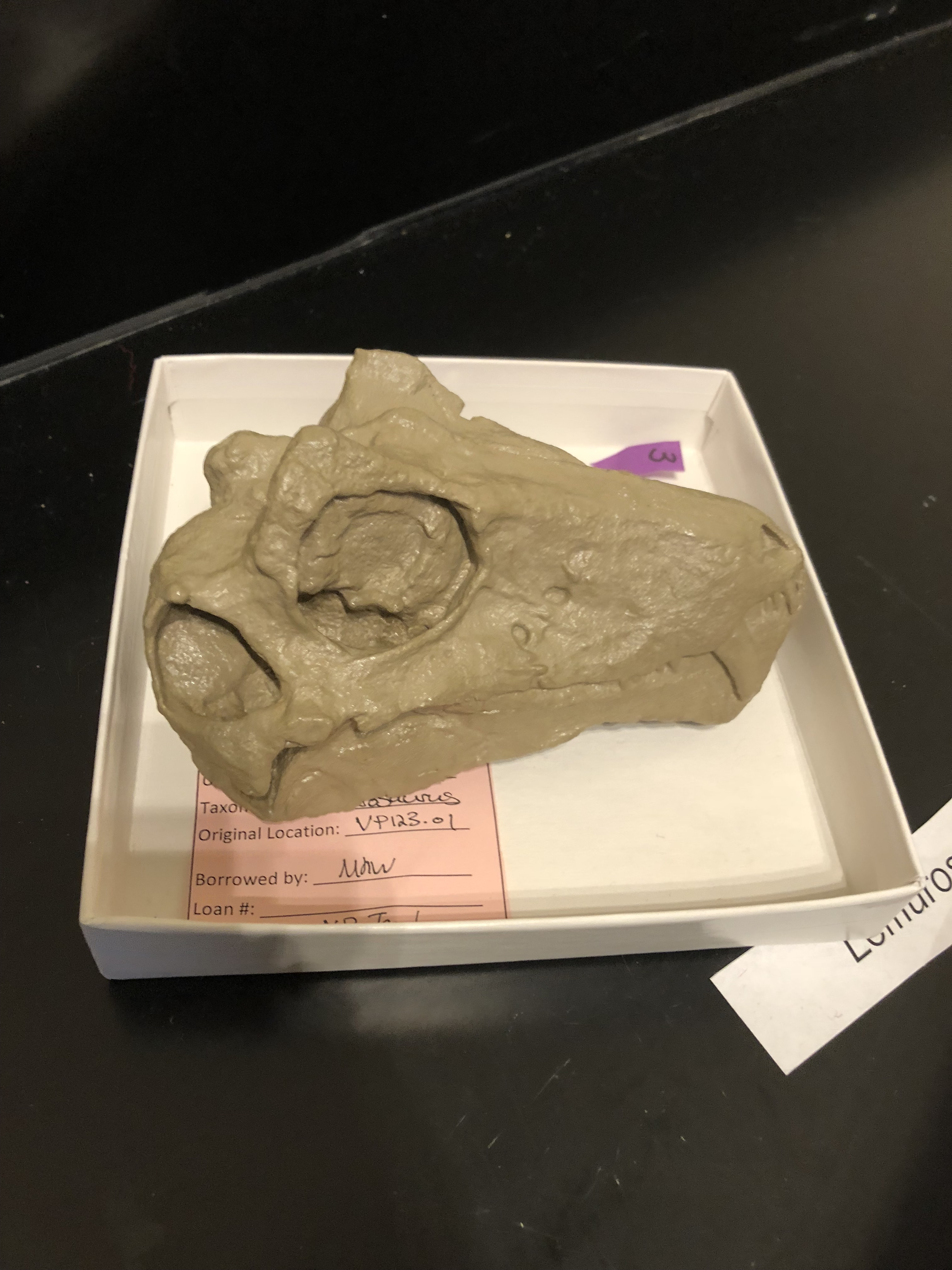
- Cast of the second known Lemurosaurus skull, in the Burke Museum

Scientific classification
- Kingdom: Animalia
- Phylum: Chordata
- Clade: Synapsida
- Clade: Therapsida
- Suborder: †Biarmosuchia
- Clade: †Burnetiamorpha
- Genus: †Lemurosaurus; Broom, 1949

Type species
- †Lemurosaurus pricei Broom, 1949

= Lemurosaurus =

Lemurosaurus Temporal range: Late Permian, 259–254 Ma

Extinct genus of therapsids

Lemurosaurus is a genus of extinct biarmosuchian therapsids from the Late Permian of South Africa. The generic epithet Lemursaurus is a mix of Latin, lemures "ghosts, spirits", and Greek, sauros, "lizard". Lemurosaurus is easily identifiable by its prominent eye crests, and large eyes. The name Lemurosaurus pricei was coined by paleontologist Robert Broom in 1949, based on a single small crushed skull, measured at approximately 86 millimeters in length, found on the Dorsfontein farm in Graaff-Reinet. To date, only two skulls of the Lemurosaurus have been discovered, so body size is unknown. The second larger, more intact, skull was found in 1974 by a team from the National Museum, Bloemfontein.

== History of discovery ==
The holotype skull was poorly preserved and referred to as BP/1/816. Lemurosaurus pricei was coined by Robert Broom in 1949 who was convinced it was a Gorgonopsian. Since 1949 it was presumed that Lemurosaurus was most closely related to Ictidorhinus martinsi. Then in 1970 this classification expanded when Rusell Sigogneu classified more genera within Ictidorhinidae and place them within Gorgonopsia. In 1989 Sigogneau restructured Ictidorhinds into four family-level taxa. These four were Biarmosuchidae, Hipposauridae, Ictidorhinidae, and Burnetiidae. Many of these classifications required further research, and some were incorrect altogether.

In 1974, a second skull known as NMQR 1702 was extracted on the farm Petersburg in South Africa, 50 kilometers southeast of the type locality. The specimen was left unprepared until 2000, when it was discovered to be a second Lemurosaurus skull. Present knowledge points to Lemurosaurus being a part of Burnetiamorpha.

Both specimens have flaws that make it difficult to make definitive conclusions as to some aspects of structure. On the BP/1/816 skull the postorbital and occipital regions of the left lateral side are missing, and on the right lateral side they are poorly preserved. The entire skull is crushed and warped, adding some ambiguity to measurements. The posterior part of the jaw is also severely damaged, and it is weathered enough that sutures cannot be distinguished. NMQR 1702 is also quite weathered on its external surface, and the different skull matrices are tough to differentiate. The left posterolateral corner of the skull is warped, resulting in missing features like a portion of the zygomatic arch, the occipital condyle, and the paraoccipital process of the opisthotic. A full skeleton has yet to be located, leaving many questions about Lemurosaurus' full size and structure.

== Description ==
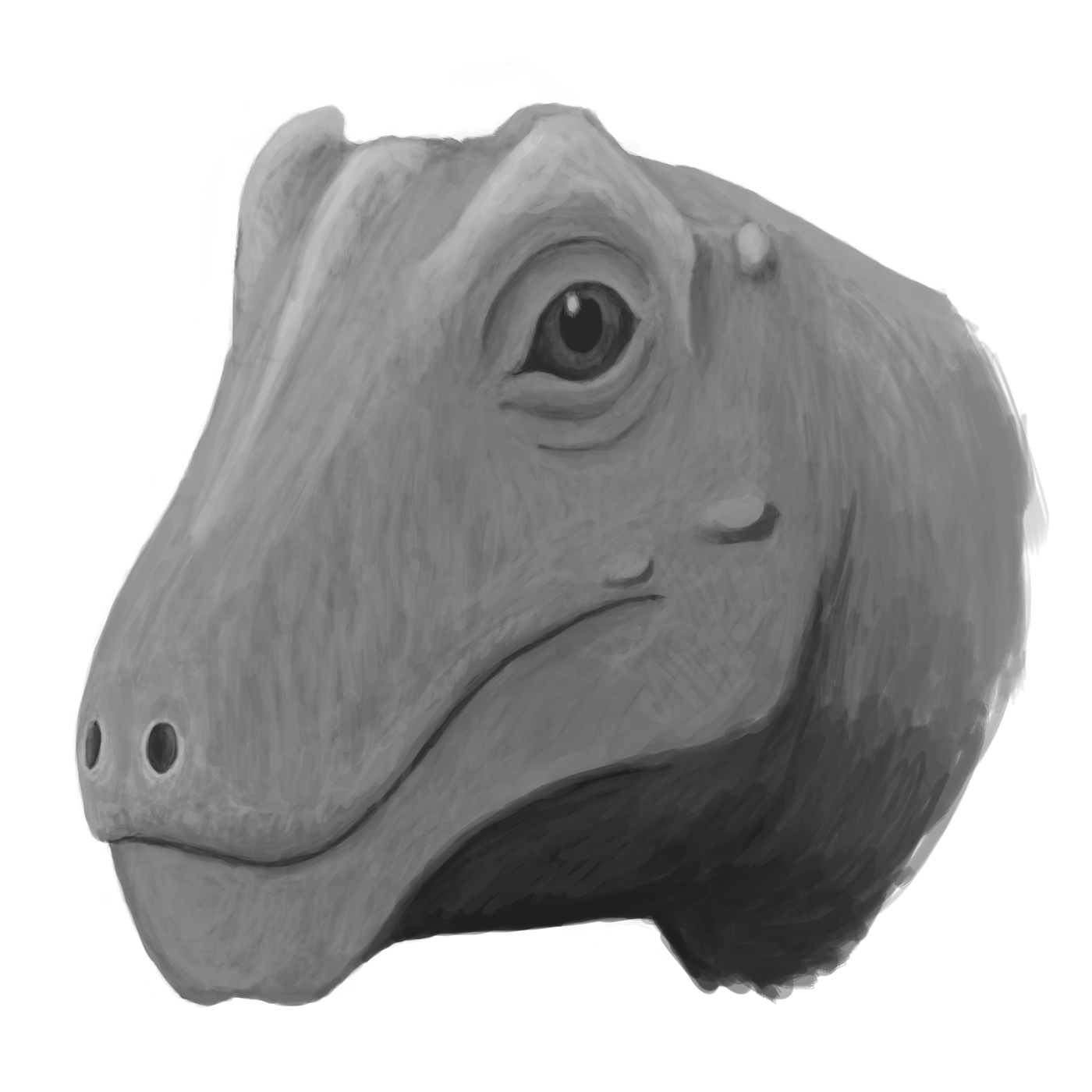
Restoration of the head

Lemurosaurus' most distinctive feature is its triangular supraorbital bosses. They are tall, stretching up on either side toward the pineal foramen. On the postfrontal there is a pachyostosed supraorbital boss, which has a stronger arch than that of BP/1/816.

The upper canines are oval when looked at in cross-section. The premaxillary dentition in NMQR 1702 is not fully intact, but there are four upper incisors. There are strong indications that there could have been five, but one was lost through weathering or poor preservation. The lower canine rests in the anterior section of the choana, much like gorgonopsians, therocephalians, and burnetiamorphs. In the third and fourth positions there are two complete incisors on the right side. A 7.7 millimeter precanine diastema is located behind the upper incisor on that same right side. This seems large, but when compared to incisors of dinocephalians and anomodonts, they are relatively small. Serration is present in NMQR 1702 but it is faint compared to the intense serration of BP/1/816. It is speculated that these differences in serration between NMQR 1702 and BP/1/816 might be ontogenetic, for it is common for juvenile therapsids to lose serration as they get older.

There are also high ridges on the dorsal margins of the orbit, and a small midline crest anterior to the pineal foreman. The lacrimal is large, with two fossae where it contacts the maxilla that are not well defined. This structure is not like anything seen in basal therapsids, but it is present in other burnetiamorphs.

The squamosal is poorly defined, but deformation of the zygomatic arch suggests the squamosal extends nearly to the posterior end of the maxilla. Also on the squamosal are two small knobs along the ventral margin. These knobs are now considered indicative of burnetiamorphs.

The occiput on Lemurosaurus is more tall and narrow than other burnetiamorphs. Measurement of scleral ring in orbital dimensions indicate Lemurosaurus were able to see in low light conditions. The inner scleral ring diameter is 18 millimeters, and the outer diameter is around 35 millimeters.

The articular and the prearticular cannot be distinguished, which might indicate they are fused. The splenial is bound by the dentary, which keeps it from being visible on the ventral edge of the mandible. The quadrate and the quadratojugal are appressed on the right side, and there is a quadratojugal foramen present.

== Classification ==
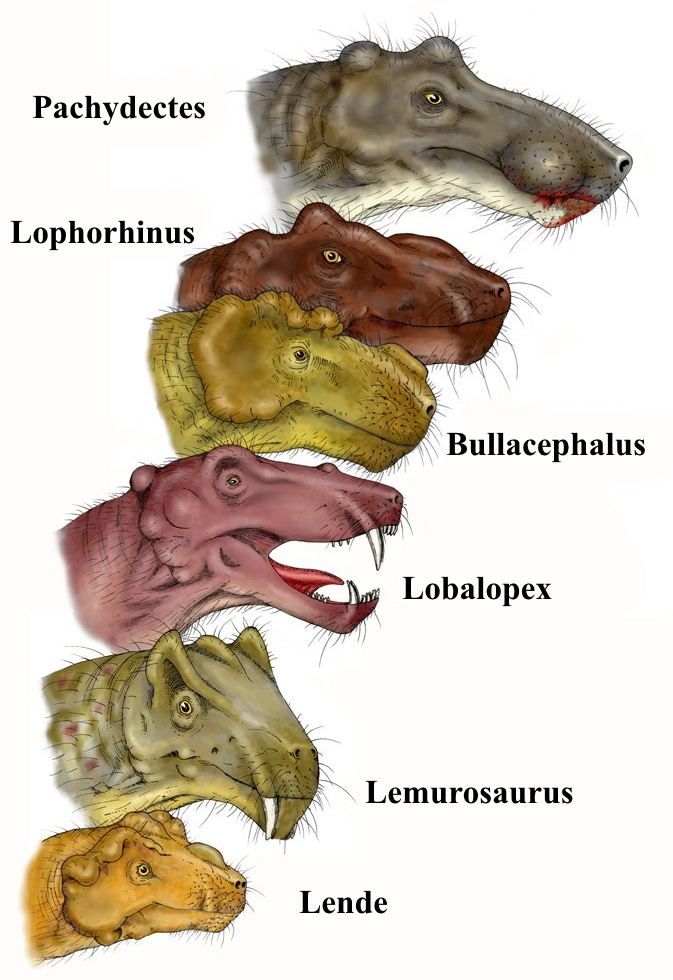
Lemurosaurus (fifth) and relatives

Lemurosaurus and Lobalopex are both biarmosuchian therapsid genera found in South Africa. The Lobalopex fossil was recovered on a farm, Quaggas Fontein 250 in South Africa and is thought to be Middle or Late Permian in age. This specimen has undergone compression, but many of the features are distinguishable. When compared to Lemurosaurus, there are several differences to note. For example, on the Lobalopex skull the median frontal ridge is not prominent, and the posterior contact with the nasal passage is almost flat. Where, in the Lemurosaurus fossil it is observed that it has a distinct medial frontal ridge. Another difference is that Lobalopex has a dorsal orbital margin that has not become thicker with extra layers of bone, where Lemurosaurus is pachyostosed. One similarity between the two taxa is that both skull fossils contained an unpaired vomer.

A partial skull was found in the Western Cape of South Africa in 1985 that lead to the discovery of a new burnetiamorph called Lophorhinus, the fossil was misclassified until 2001. Though its specific relation to Lemurosaurus is still being worked out. This specimen is rather deformed in comparison to the other taxa, but some similarities between these species can be seen. For example, the Lemurosaurus, Lophorhinus has a short maxillary-prefrontal suture. One major difference includes a midline suture with the nasals that is not present in most burnetiamorphs. The discovery of this fossil is important because it shows that there were two related taxa (Lophorhinus and Lobalopex) alive during the same assemblage zone.

The exact relationships within this branch uncertain. The prevailing theory is that Lemurosaurus is the most basal of the three, with Lobalopex and Lophorhinus being more closely related. Lemurosaurus' characteristics place it closer to burnetiids than to its biarmosuchian genera, reclassifying them to burnetiamorpha, altering the previous belief that they were in Ictidorhinidae.

== Palaeobiology ==
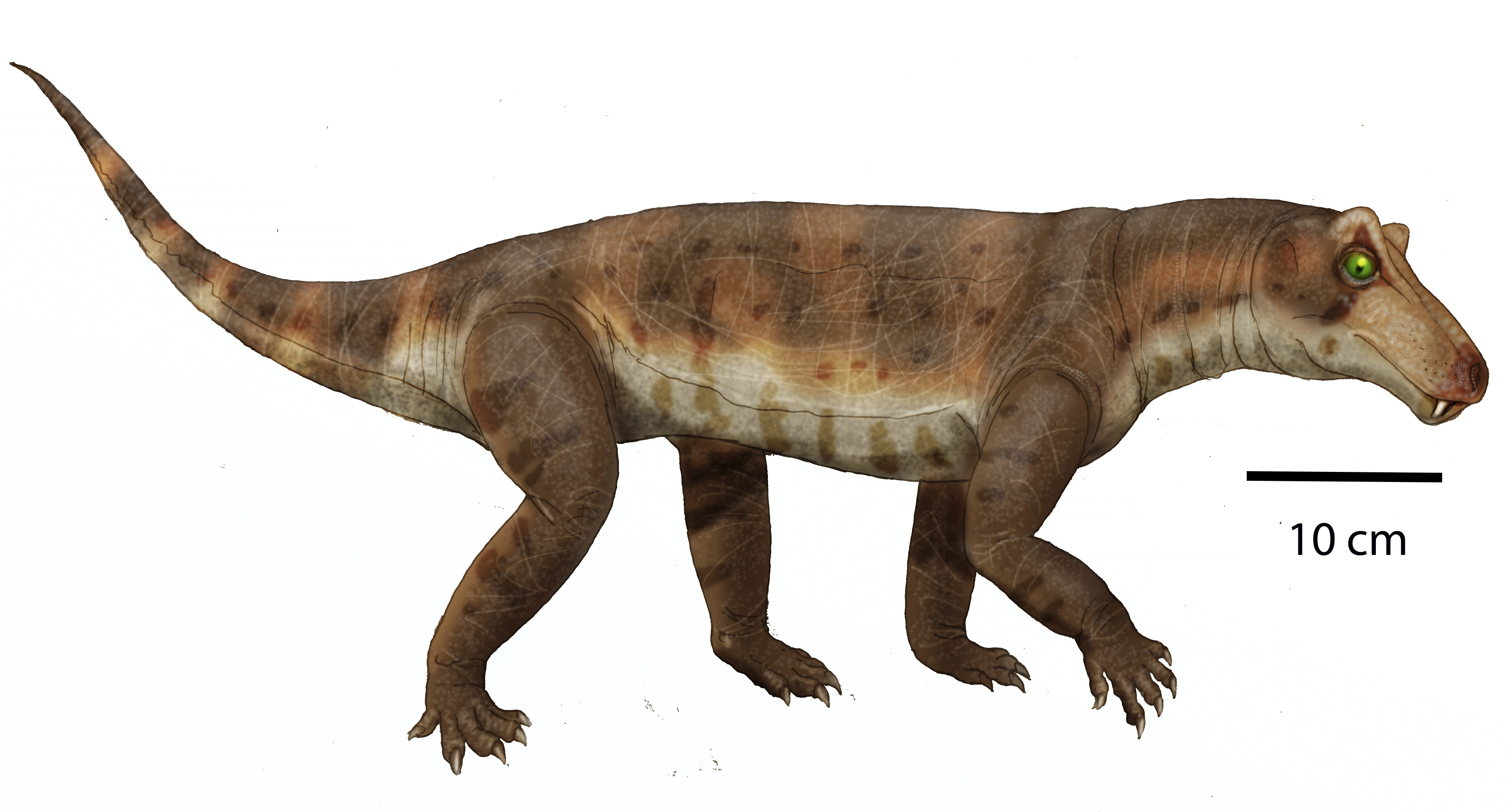
Restoration showing hypothetical body

It is evident that Biarmosuchia are commonly carnivores, but there has been no conclusive evidence on whether Lemurosaurus is carnivorous, or its specific diet.

== Palaeoecology ==
The Karoo Basin makes up the majority of South Africa, covering about 300,000 km^{2}. Within this basin lies different zones that made it difficult to pinpoint exactly where Lemurosaurus was positioned in the timeline. Lemurosaurus was incorrectly placed in the Dicynodon Assemblage Zone but was later confirmed to live within the Cistecephalus Assemblage Zone by matching the rocks of the fossil with the rocks of the area. During the late Permian the climate was beginning to warm up and had instances of seasonal rain. There were also semi-permanent lakes present at that time.

For some time, it was believed that early therapsids originated from Russia. However, there is ambiguity as to the specific ages of the fauna in each location. This resulted in two prominent theories as to how Lemurosaurus ended up in South Africa. The first is that therapsids originated in South Africa, and their presence in Russia can be explained through a dispersal event. The second theory is that therapsids had Pangaean distribution and we do not have a complete line of their evolutionary diversity. More fossil data is needed to draw a concrete conclusion.

Graaf-Reinet is located in the Karoo Basin of South Africa. The Karoo Basin is a sedimentary basin, that contains volcanic ash deposits. The basin was deposited in the Carboniferous to the Early Jurassic. Previously, there was difficulty dating this time period, but with the "zircon U-Pb sensitive high-resolution ion microprobe (SHRIMP)," it is now possible to date the soils more accurately. It was found that the Cistecephalus Assemblage zone began 256.25 Ma and lasted until 255.2 Ma.
