= Middleton Formation =

Late middle Permian geological formation in the Eastern Cape

- Stratigraphic range: Middle Permian; ~265–256 Ma
- Middleton Formation exposures are found in the Eastern Cape of South Africa
- Type: Geological formation
- Unit of: Adelaide Subgroup, Beaufort Group
- Underlies: Balfour Formation
- Overlies: Abrahamskraal Formation
- Thickness: up to 300 m (980 ft)

Lithology
- Primary: Mudstone, siltstone
- Other: Sandstone

Location
- Coordinates: 32.949°S 25.816°E
- Approximate paleocoordinates: 62.7°S 29.3°W
- Region: Eastern Cape
- Country: South Africa
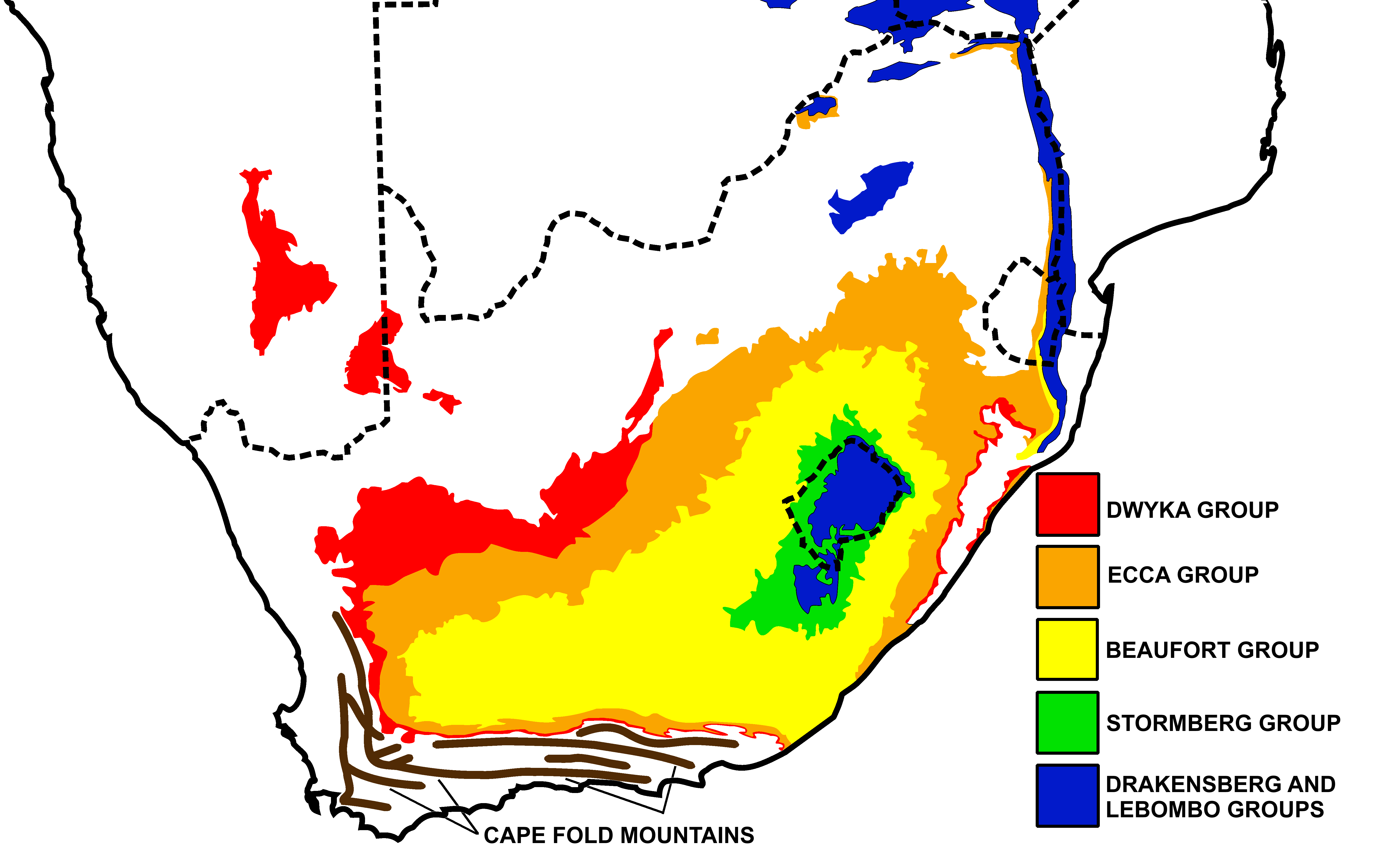

The Middleton Formation is a geological formation that extends through the Northern Cape, Western Cape, and Eastern Cape provinces of South Africa. It overlies the lower Abrahamskraal Formation, and is the eastern correlate, East of 24ºE, of the Teekloof Formation. Outcrops and exposures of the Middleton Formation range from Graaff-Reinet in the Eastern Cape onwards. The Middleton Formation's type locality lies near the small hamlet, Middleton, approximately 25 km south of Cookhouse. Other exposures lie in hillsides along the Great Fish River in the Eastern Cape. The Middleton Formation forms part of the Adelaide Subgroup of the Beaufort Group, which itself forms part of the Karoo Supergroup.

== Geology ==
The Middleton Formation is the eastern correlate of the Teekloof Formation. Both these formations overlie the Abrahamskraal Formation. The upper Middleton Formation correlates with eastern exposures of the uppermost Pristerognathus Assemblage Zone, and is late Middle Permian (Guadalupian) in age. Current thought posits that the eruption of the Emeishan Large Igneous Province caused the middle Permian (end-Guadalupian) extinction event, during which the Middleton Formation rocks formed.

The Middleton Formation, like the underlying Abrahamskraal Formation, is rich in mudstone. However, the mudstones are notably redder in colour in the Middleton formation than in the Abrahamskraal Formation. The Middleton mudstones contain wave-and current-ripples, as well as calcareous nodules, which weather out brown. Minor sandstones, containing argillaceous layers, interspace the mudstones. These sandstone layers are important stratigraphic markers for geologists and paleontologists. The mudstones were deposited in a shallow, low-energy, freshwater lacustrine environment. Observation of the sandstones reveals that high-energy fluvial events infrequently disturbed this low-energy depositional environment. These disturbances are associated with extensive argillaceous overbank deposits. The argillaceous sandstone deposits contain many trace fossils of invertebrates, suggesting that the deposits were nutrient-rich.

== Paleontology ==
The Middleton Formation does not contain as many fossils as its western correlate, the Teekloof Formation. This is particularly true of vertebrate fossils. The end-Guadalupian extinction event caused a drop in species diversity in the Middleton Formation compared to the Abrahamskraal Formation. However, vertebrate fossils yielded from the Middleton Formation are the same as those associated with the Pristerognathus Assemblage Zone. When found, vertebrate fossils appear most frequently in the mudstone and calcareous nodule deposits.

Trace fossils are more commonly found in this formation than vertebrate fossils. These trace fossils lie in the sandstones and include preserved burrows, track ways, feeding trails and other evidence of shallow-water-dwelling invertebrates. The invertebrates include annelids, aquatic oligochaetes, nematodes, insect larvae, and planolites. The formation's trace fossils also offer evidence for the presence of the bony fishes Namaichthys and Atherstonia.
