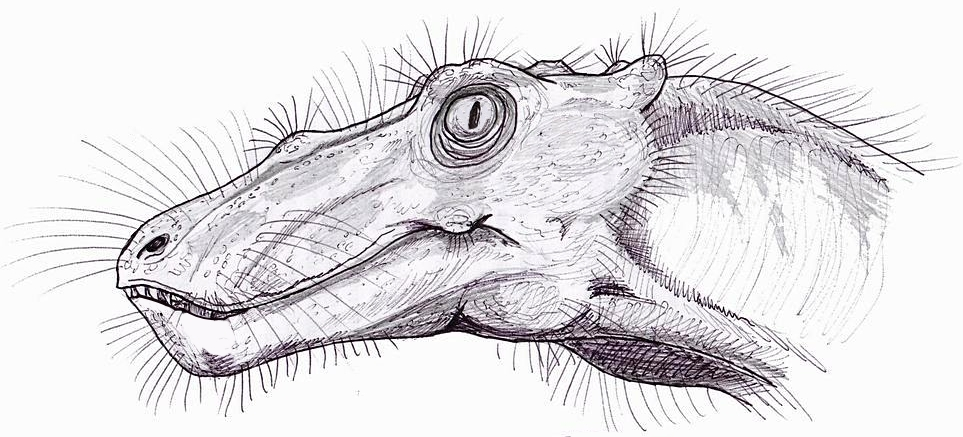
- Life restoration of Lobalopex mordax

Scientific classification
- Kingdom: Animalia
- Phylum: Chordata
- Clade: Synapsida
- Clade: Therapsida
- Suborder: †Biarmosuchia
- Clade: †Burnetiamorpha
- Genus: †Lobalopex; Sidor et al., 2004

Type species
- †L. mordax Sidor et al., 2004

= Lobalopex =

Lobalopex Temporal range: Late Permian ~260–250 Ma

Extinct genus of therapsids

Lobalopex (Greek for “lobe fox” – “lobos” meaning lobe and “alopex” meaning fox) is an extinct genus of biarmosuchian therapsids. It was alive during the Late Permian and has only been found in the Teekloof Formation in South Africa. The only known species of the genus is Lobalopex mordax. Lobalopex is part of the clade of Burnetiamorpha, which have fossil specimens located in multiple areas of Africa and Russia.

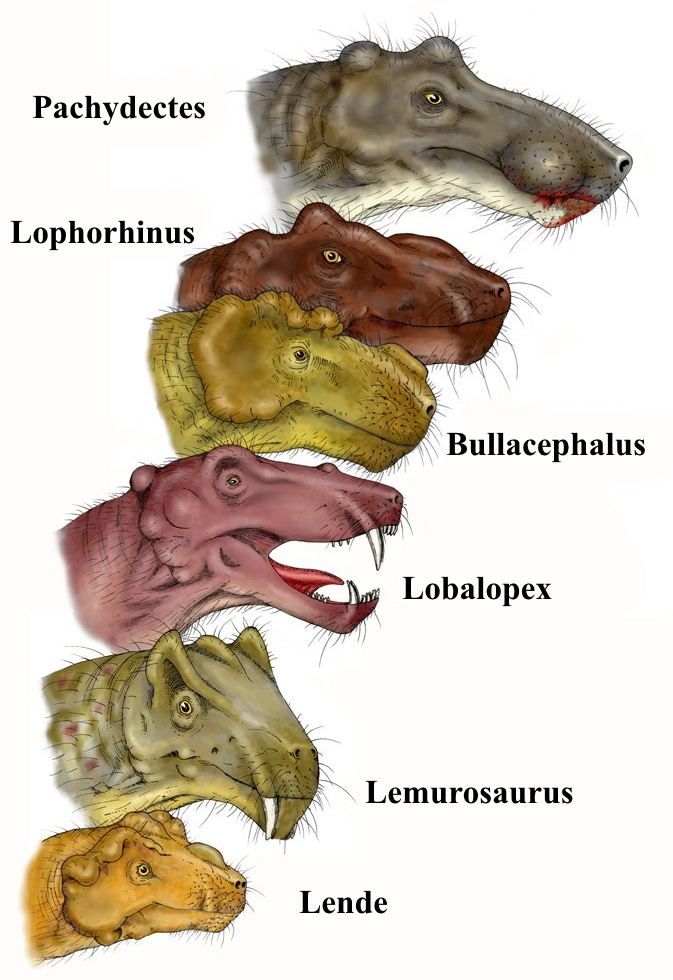
Lobalopex (fourth) and relatives

== Discovery ==
From 1923 to 1997 there were only two known specimens of burnetiid therapsids. The discovery of Lobalopex occurred in 2004, adding it to the Biarmosuchian phylogenetic tree. In 2007, three years after the discovery of Lobalopex, a partial skull of a new therapsid called Lophorhinus was found. The discovery of Lophorhinus also led researchers to prove that multiple of these burnetiamorph taxon co-existed with each other. Overall, the burnetiamorph fossil record supports a macroevolutionary relationship between cranial adornment and an increased speciation rate.

Lobalopex is part of a clade Burnetiamorpha, however there is also a more derived crown group known as Burnetiidae, that Lobalopex is not part of based on the evidence that has been collected. Using updated cladistics of twelve biarmosuchians, data suggested that Lophorhinus is a sister taxon to Lobalopex. Lophorhinus and Lobalopex differ in their shape of anterior vomer, arrangement of palatal teeth, paired nasals, and the height of the supraorbital boss.

The Lobalopex fossil was found by collectors working under the guidance of Dr. Colin MacRae of the Geological Survey of South Africa. It was found in gray and purple mudstone within the Teekloof Formation. This was in the Tropidostoma Assemblage Zone, which is believed to give rise to fossils of Middle to Late Permian in age.

== Description ==
The fossil of Lobalopex is a partial skull with lower jaws and the first four cervical vertebrae, the first postcranial elements found of a burnetiamorph. Based on this fossil, the holotype paper describes the characterization of the genus by a low median nasal eminence, a small and unpachyostosed supraorbital boss, small posteriorly projecting supratemporal “horns”, the ventral surface of the transverse flange of pterygoid being edentulous and sharply rigid, and a laterally directed knob present between pterygoid and palatine dentigerous bosses. Due to the lack of postcranial fossils, its difficult to determine information about biarmosuchians locomotion. Using a few limb bones and vertebrae of various specimens, researchers have hypothesized that their postcranial skeleton is similar to gorgonopsians, and they maintain a sprawling posture. There has also been recent finding of three juvenile burnetiamorph skulls, differing from adults by their large orbits, open cranial structures, and incomplete ossification of the braincase.

=== Skull ===
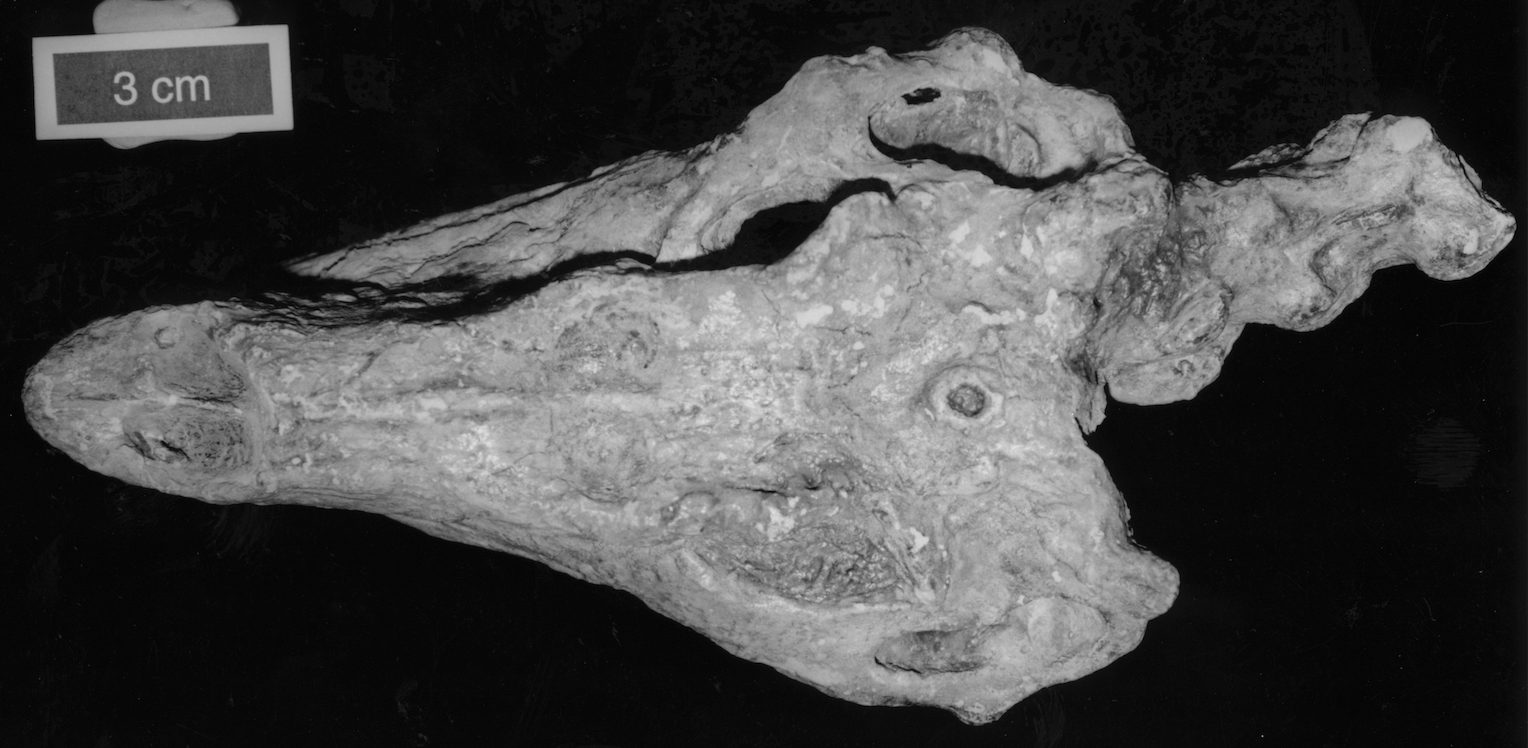
Lobalopex skull in dorsal view

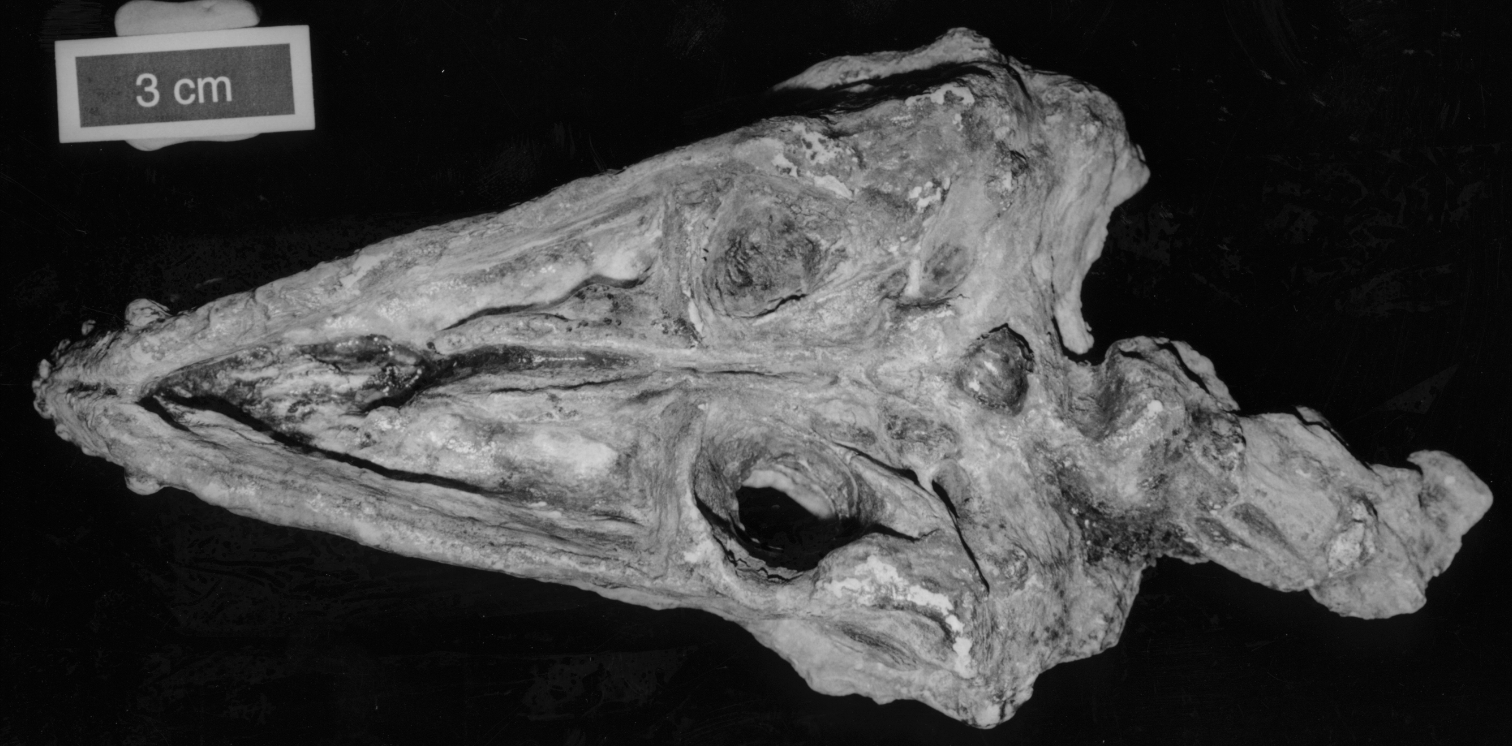
Lobalopex skull in ventral view

The skull of Lobalopex retains many primitive features of biarmosuchians, including a broad intertemporal region and small lateral temporal fenestrae. The dorsal process has been lost due to erosion, so it is not able to be determined if the dorsal processes of the premaxillae are long (like in Biarmosuchus and Hipposaurus) or short (as in Lycaenodon). There are nine small incisors preserved. The maxilla resembles the typical shape of sphenacodontoid pelycosaurs. The nasals of Lobalopex are partially fused with distinct lateral margins of the nasals. The supraorbital in Lobalopex, unlike in Burnetia and Bullacephalus, is not divided into separate anterior and posterior portions. The palatine teeth form two longitudinal rows separateted from the pterygoid teeth by a short gap. The postparietal bone has been found to be a different shape in many biarmosuchians, but in Lobalopex is described to be “rhomboidal”. Another key feature of the specimen is the small but prominent boss or “horn” on the temporal fenestra.

=== Lower Jaw ===
On the jaw of Lobalopex, the dentary is the largest element, spanning through about the middle of the orbital fenestrae. Only the first incisor is visible but based on its size there were likely four of them. As in most therapsids, the reflected lamina takes up most the lateral surface of angular.

=== Cervical Vertebrae ===
The discovery of these four cervical vertebrae is a very rare find in burnetiamorph fossils. The atlas contains paired atlantal neural arches, an atlantal intercentrum, and an atlantal pleurocentrum. The axis includes an axial intercentrum, pleurocentrum, neural arch, and paired ribs. The axial pleurocentrum is similar to that of Hipposaurus and Biarmosuchus, in that it is elongated and completely fused to the neural arch. Due to the plane of the zygapophyseal facets and other observations of the skull, researchers hypothesized that the head was held at about a right angle from the neck.

== Paleoenvironment ==
The skull of Lobalopex mordax was found in the Permian Teekloof Formation (Tropidostoma Assemblage Zone) of the Victoria West District, South Africa. Many other burnetiamorph therapsids have been found in this area, including Lophorhinus, a sister taxon of Lobalopex and Burnetiidae. Current data suggests that this region in South Africa may have been the area of origin for burnetiamorphs, which makes central Africa the corridor for migration of this clade across Africa during the end of the Permian. It seems that this north-south interchange was common for these animals and their distribution is aligned with a Pangean geography. This was further supported with the finding of the first burnetiamorph outside of South Africa or Russia, Lende Chiweta, found in Malawi. This well-preserved skull and lower jaw was discovered in 2015. A recent fossil finding in 2021 is said to confirm the strong endemism of burnetiamorphs. This new fossil, Isengops, was the second burnetiamorph recognized in Zambia and continued to provide evidence of the small localization of this clade. The discovery of Isengops led to further cladistic analysis, discovering that the Russian biarmosuchians are scattered throughout the phylogenetic tree and do not form a sister clade with each other. Zambia has also been the location of one of the newest findings of burnetiamorph therapsids, Mobaceras zambeziense.
