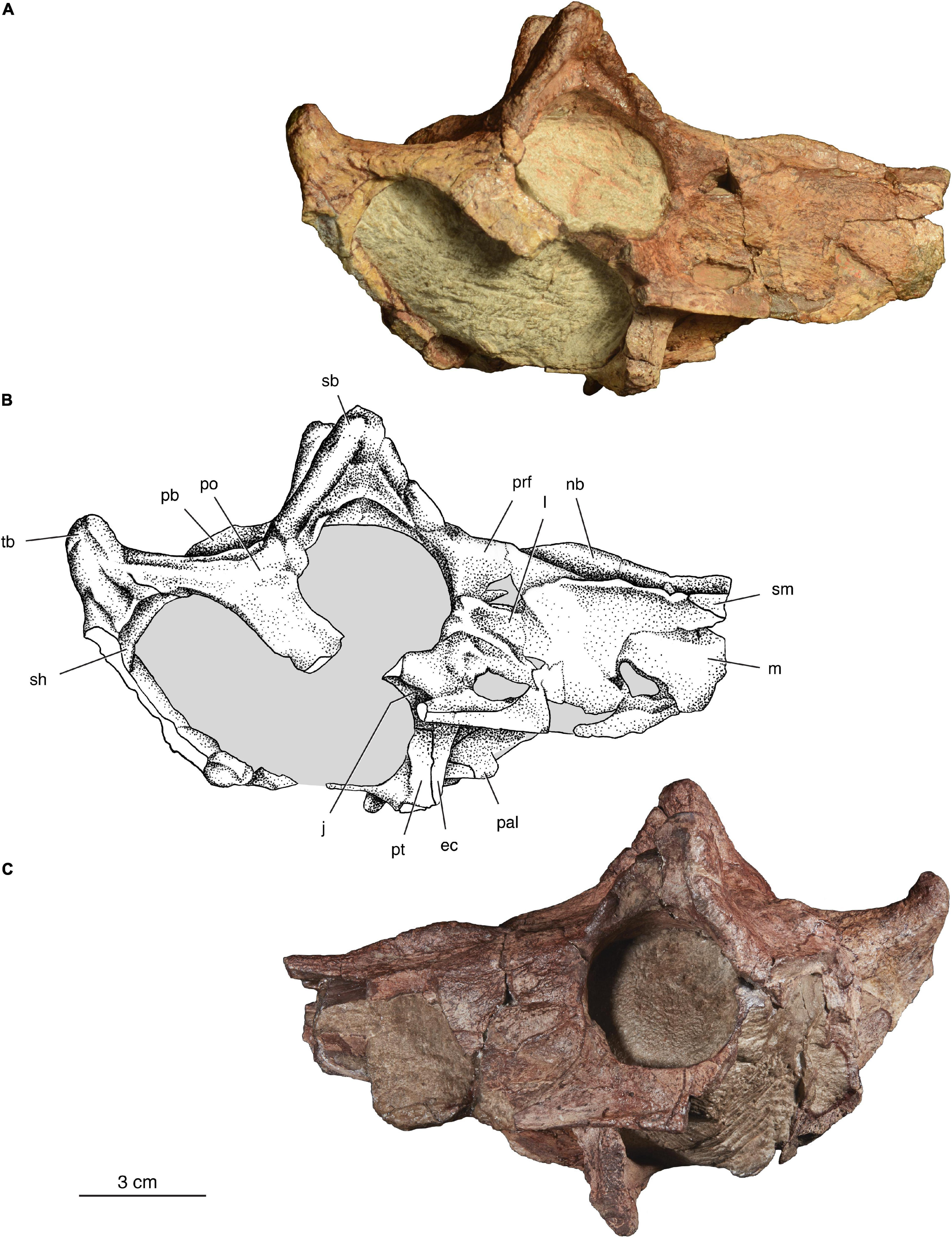
- Holotype specimen (NHCC LB363)

Scientific classification
- Kingdom: Animalia
- Phylum: Chordata
- Clade: Synapsida
- Clade: Therapsida
- Suborder: †Biarmosuchia
- Clade: †Burnetiamorpha
- Genus: †Isengops; Sidor, Tabor & Smith, 2021
- Species: †I. luangwensis

Binomial name
- †Isengops luangwensis Sidor, Tabor & Smith, 2021

= Isengops =

Isengops Temporal range: Late Permian, Wuchiapingian

Extinct genus of therapsids

Isengops (lit. 'horn face') is an extinct genus of burnetiamorph therapsid from the Late Permian of Zambia. The genus contains a single species, Isengops luangwensis, known from a partial skull. It is characterized by a nasal ridge, tall, triangular bosses over the orbits, and paired supratemporal "horns".
