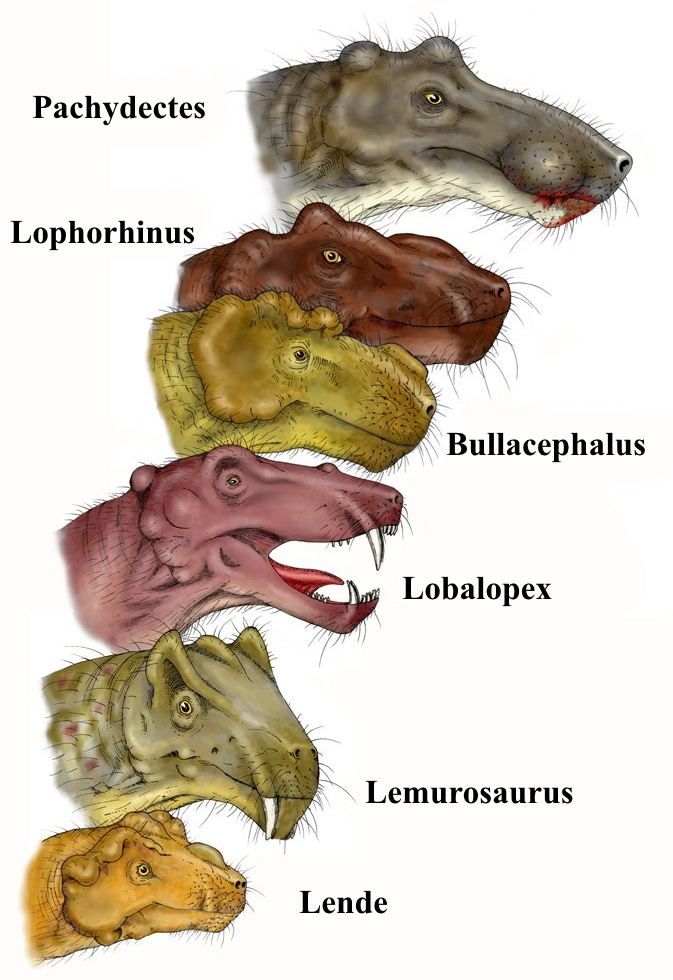
- Heads of different burnetiamorphs : Pachydectes, Lophorhinus, Bullacephalus, Lobalopex, Lemurosaurus and Lende.

Scientific classification
- Kingdom: Animalia
- Phylum: Chordata
- Clade: Synapsida
- Clade: Therapsida
- Suborder: †Biarmosuchia
- Clade: †Burnetiamorpha; Broom, 1923

Subgroups
- †Impumlophantsi; †Isengops; †Lemurosaurus; †Lende; †Lobalopex; †Lophorhinus; †Burnetiidae

= Burnetiamorpha =

Burnetiamorpha Temporal range: Middle Permian - Late Permian,265–252 Ma

Extinct clade of therapsids

Burnetiamorpha is a clade of biarmosuchian therapsids. Burnetiamorphs are the most derived biarmosuchians. The name Burnetiamorpha has been in use since South African paleontologist Robert Broom erected the group in 1923, but it has recently been put to use in phylogenetic classification as a clade including Burnetiidae and its closest relatives, including Lemurosaurus, Lophorhinus, and Lobalopex.

== Phylogeny ==
Below is a cladogram modified from Sidor and Smith (2007) showing the phylogenetic position of Burnetiamorpha among biarmosuchians:

- Biarmosuchia
  - Biarmosuchus
  - - Hipposaurus
    - - Lycaenodon
      - - Herpetoskylax
        - - Ictidorhinus
          - Burnetiamorpha
            - Lemurosaurus
            - - Lobalopex
              - Lophorhinus
              - Burnetiidae
                - - Proburnetia
                  - Paraburnetia
                - - Burnetia
                  - Bullacephalus
                  - Niuksenitia
