= Palemydops =

Scientific classification
- Kingdom: Animalia
- Phylum: Chordata
- Clade: Synapsida
- Clade: Therapsida
- Clade: †Anomodontia
- Clade: †Dicynodontia
- Family: †Emydopidae
- Genus: †Palemydops; Broom, 1922

Extinct genus of tetrapods

Palemydops is an extinct genus of non-mammalian synapsid.
