= Nodule (geology) =

Small mass of a mineral with a contrasting composition to the enclosing sediment or rock

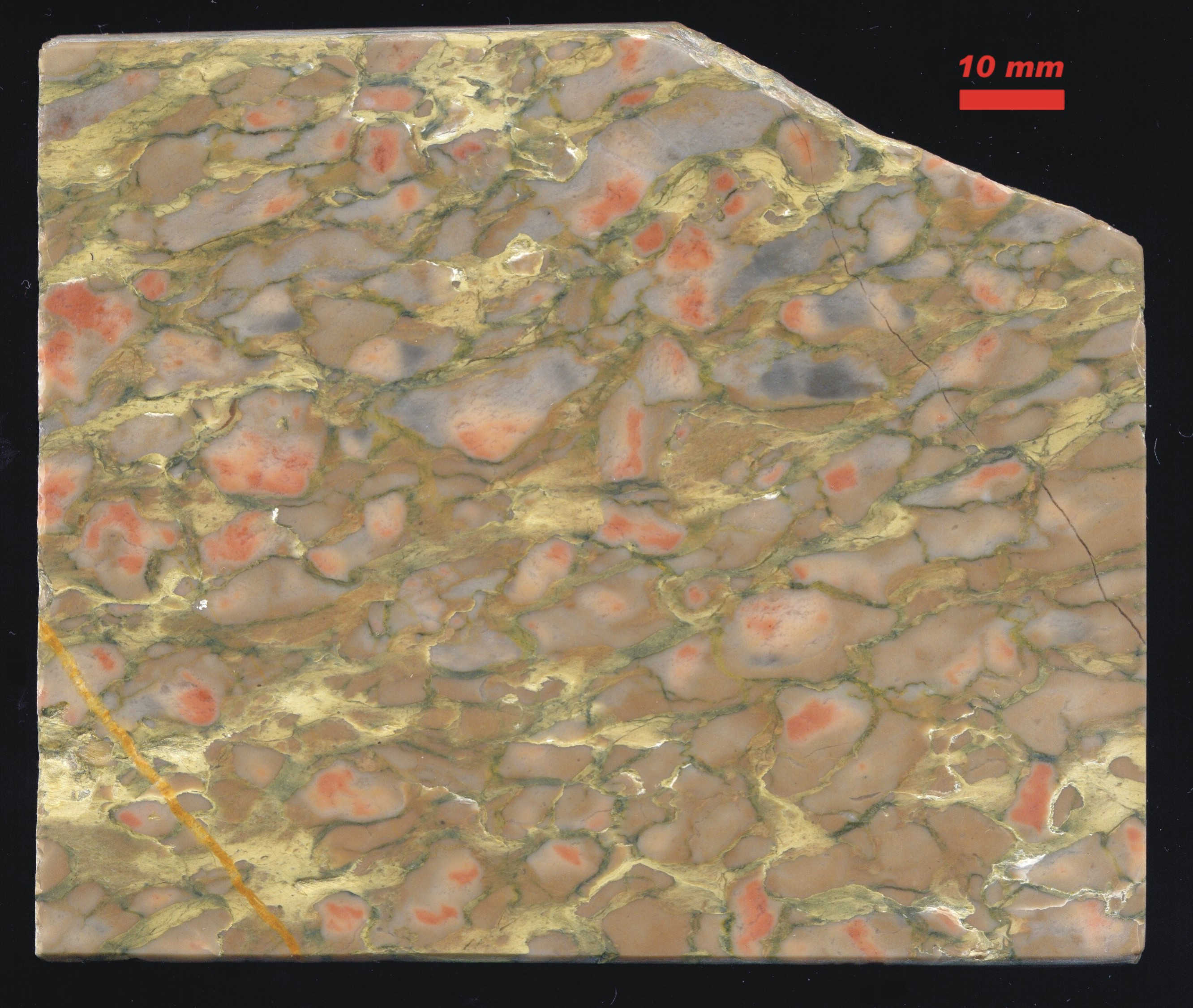
Devonian nodular limestone

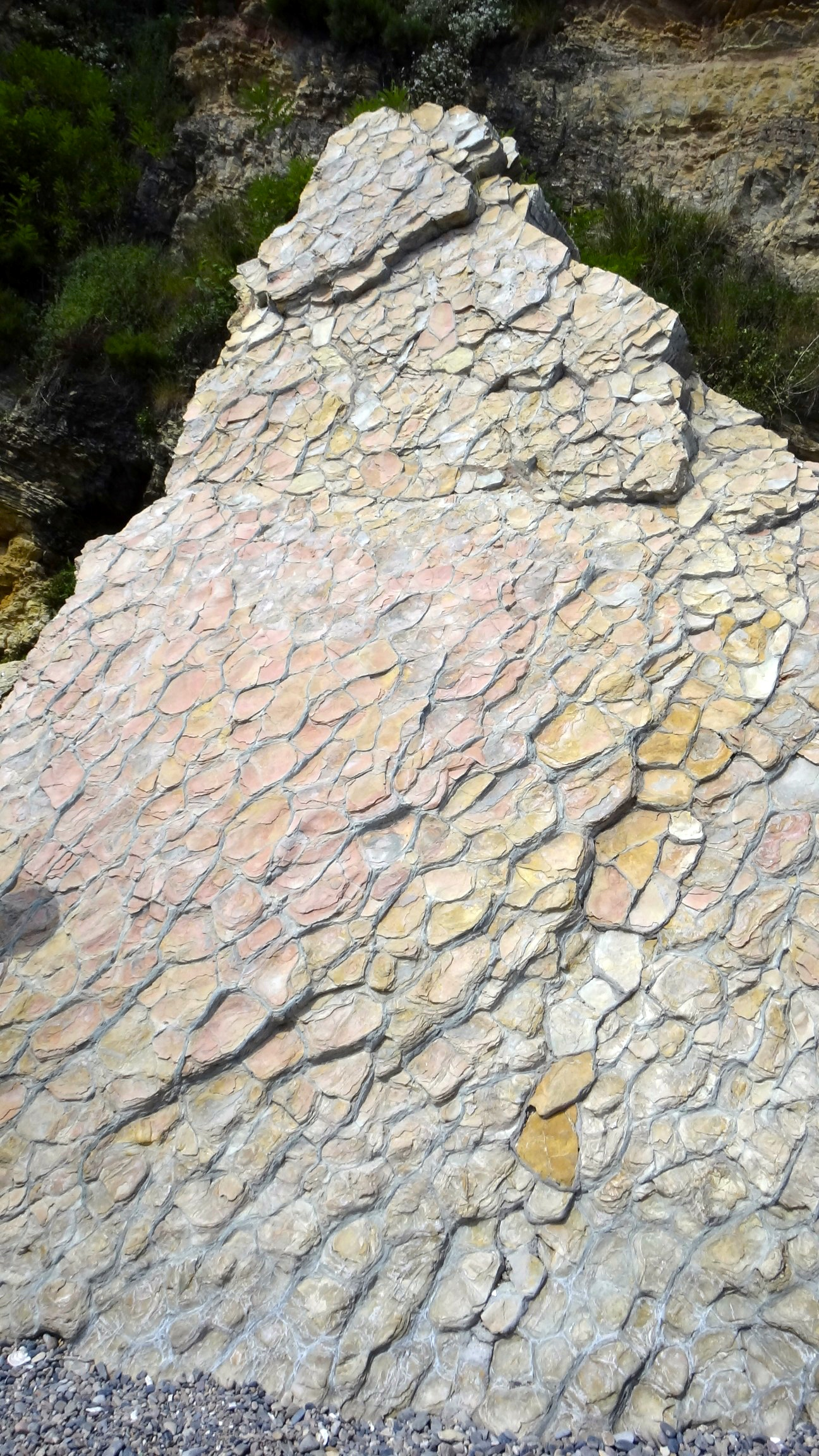
Concretionary nodular limestone at Jinshitan Coastal National Geopark, Dalian, China

In geology and particularly in sedimentology, a nodule is a small, irregularly rounded knot, mass, or lump of a mineral or mineral aggregate that typically has a contrasting composition from the enclosing sediment or sedimentary rock. Examples include pyrite nodules in coal, a chert nodule in limestone, or a phosphorite nodule in marine shale. Normally, a nodule has a warty or knobby surface and exists as a discrete mass within the host strata. In general, they lack any internal structure except for the preserved remnants of original bedding or fossils. Nodules are closely related to concretions and sometimes these terms are used interchangeably. Minerals that typically form nodules include calcite, chert, apatite (phosphorite), anhydrite, and pyrite.

Nodular is used to describe a sediment or sedimentary rock composed of scattered to loosely packed nodules in a matrix of like or unlike character. It is also used to describe mineral aggregates that occur in the form of nodules, e.g. colloform mineral aggregate with a bulbed surface.

Nodule is also used for widely scattered concretionary lumps of manganese, cobalt, iron, and nickel found on the floors of the world's oceans. This is especially true of manganese nodules. Manganese and phosphorite nodules form on the seafloor and are syndepositional in origin. Thus, technically speaking, they are concretions instead of nodules.

Chert and flint nodules are often found in beds of limestone and chalk. They form from the redeposition of amorphous silica arising from the dissolution of siliceous spicules of sponges, or debris from radiolaria and the postdepositional replacement of either the enclosing limestone or chalk by this silica.

== See also ==
- Chert – Hard, fine-grained sedimentary rock composed of cryptocrystalline silica
- Flint – Cryptocrystalline form of the mineral quartz
