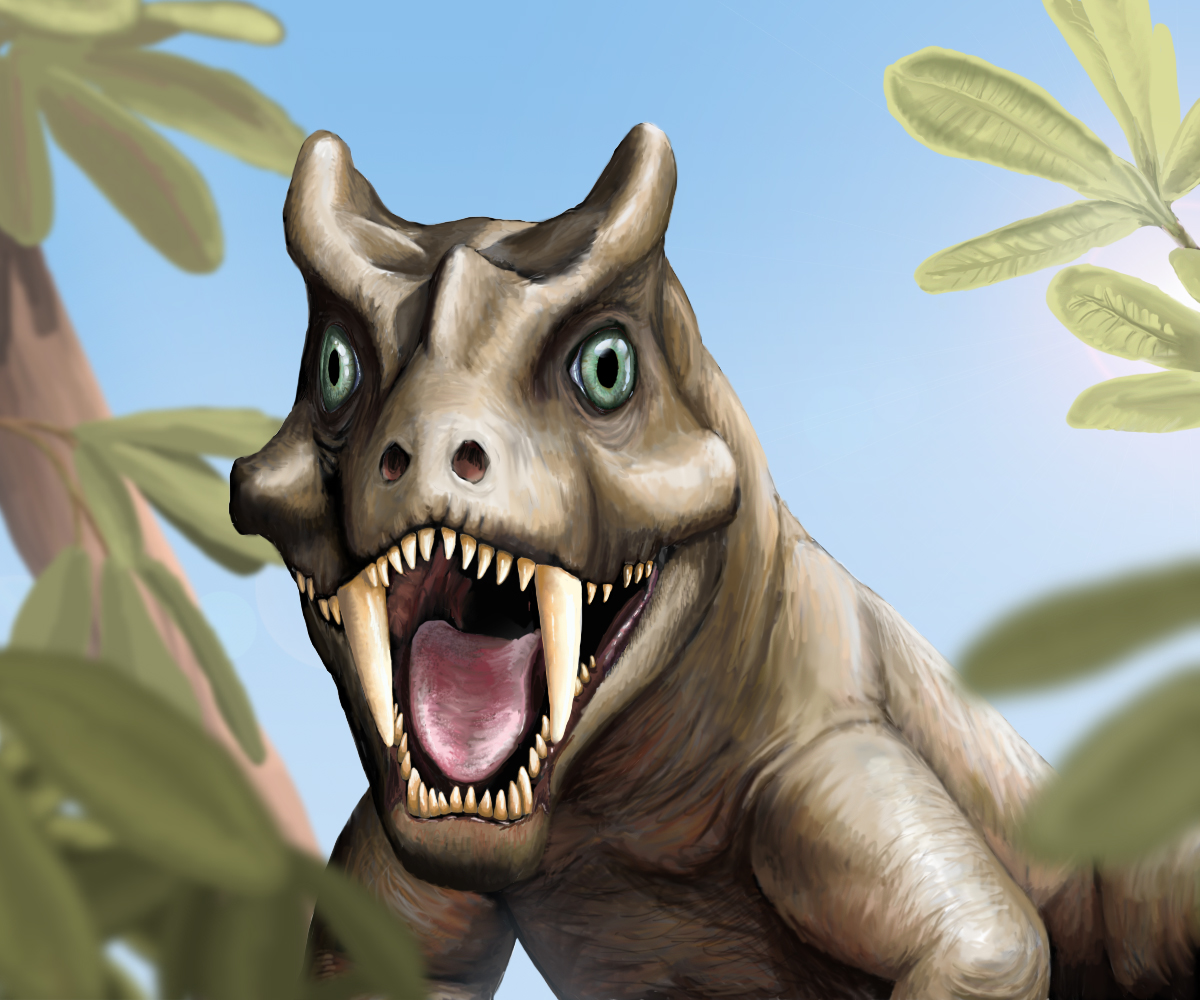
- Life restoration of Lophorhinus willodenensis

Scientific classification
- Domain: Eukaryota
- Kingdom: Animalia
- Phylum: Chordata
- Clade: Synapsida
- Clade: Therapsida
- Suborder: †Biarmosuchia
- Clade: †Burnetiamorpha
- Genus: †Lophorhinus; Sidor and Smith, 2007

Type species
- †L. willodenensis Sidor and Smith, 2007

= Lophorhinus =

Lophorhinus Temporal range: Late Permian

Extinct genus of therapsids

Lophorhinus is an extinct genus of biarmosuchian therapsids from the Late Permian of South Africa. The type species L. willodenensis was named in 2007. It is known from the anterior half of a skull.

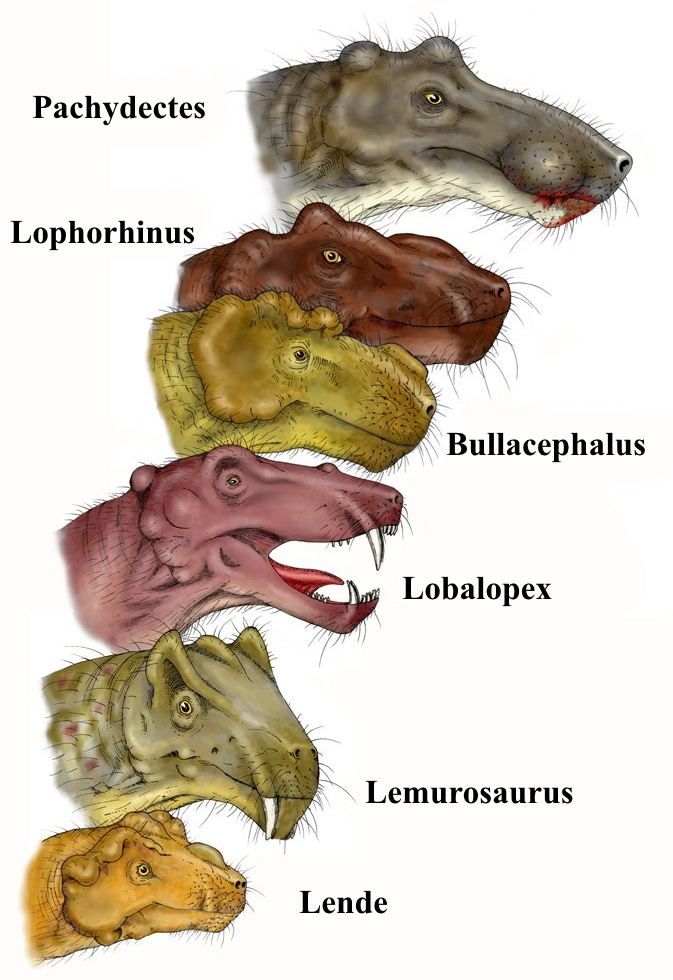
Lophorhinus (second) and relatives
