= Usili Formation =

Geologic formation in Tanzania

- Stratigraphic range: Lopingian (Wuchiapingian to Changhsingian); ~259–253 Ma
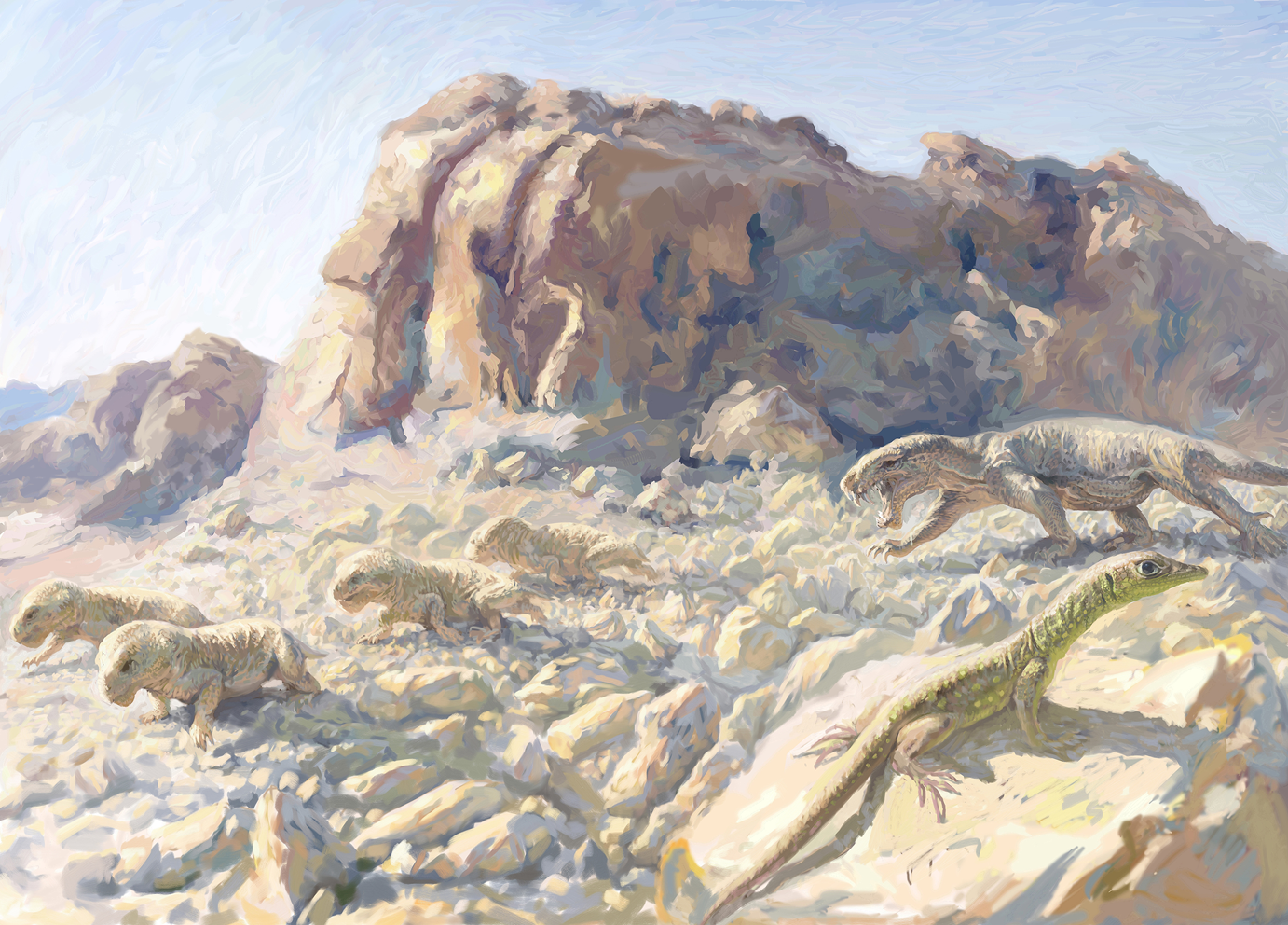
- Paleoenivronment reconstruction of locality B35
- Type: Geological formation
- Unit of: Songea Group
- Underlies: Manda Formation
- Overlies: Ruhuhu Formation
- Thickness: 260 m (850 ft)

Lithology
- Primary: Sandstone, conglomerate
- Other: Siltstone, mudstone

Location
- Coordinates: 10.3°S 35.1°E
- Approximate paleocoordinates: 55.1°S 15.2°E
- Region: Ruvuma Region
- Country: Tanzania
- Extent: Ruhuhu Basin

Type section
- Named for: Usili Mountain
- Named by: Stockley
- Year defined: 1932
- Usili Formation (Tanzania)

The Usili Formation is a Late Permian geologic formation in Tanzania. It preserves fossils of many terrestrial vertebrates from the Permian, including temnospondyls, pareiasaurs, therapsids, and the archosauromorph Aenigmastropheus.

== History of study ==
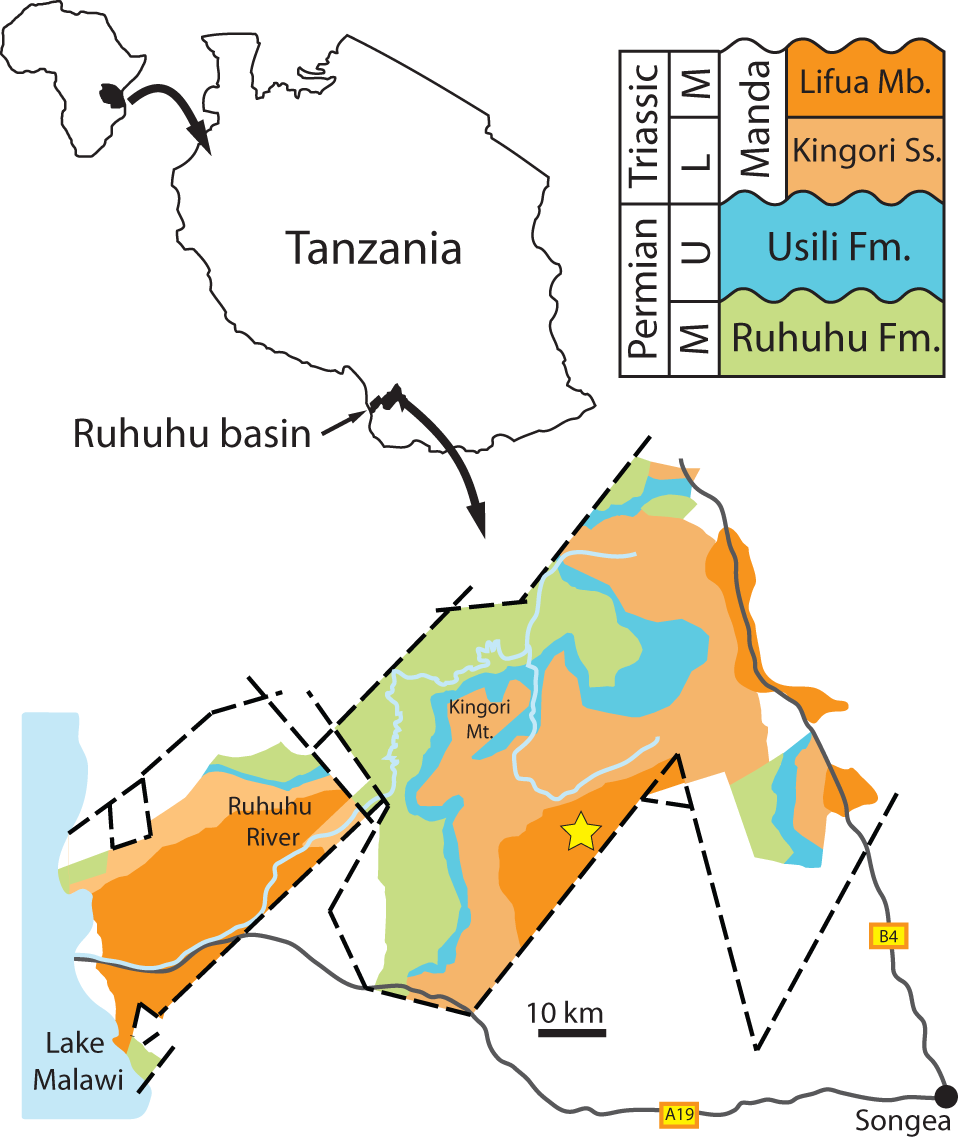
Lifua Member of the Manda beds

One of the first to study rocks of the Usili Formation was British geologist G. M. Stockley. In 1932, Stockley explored the geology of the Ruhuhu Basin in Tanzania. He called a series of layers dating from the Late Carboniferous to the Middle Triassic of the Songea Series and divided it into eight units labelled K1-K8. Stockley was also the first to describe fossils from these rocks, naming an older layer the "Lower Bone Bed" and a younger layer the "Upper Bone Bed".

In 1957, paleontologist Alan J. Charig described many more fossils from the upper bone beds in his Ph.D. thesis for the University of Cambridge. Subsequently, Stockley's units were renamed, Charig (1963) calling unit K6 the Kawinga Formation, K7 the Kingori Sandstones, and K8 the Manda Formation. Fossils were identified in many strata, invalidating Stockley's division into two distinct bone beds. Since Charig's description, the Kawinga Formation has been renamed the Usili Formation, the Kingori Sandstones have become the Kingori Sandstone Member of the Manda Formation, and Charig's original Manda Formation has become a subunit of the formation called the Lifua Member. Six formations and one informal unit are currently recognized in the Songea Group (Ruhuhu basin) rocks range in age from Pennsylvanian to Anisian, including the Idusi (K1), Mchuchuma (K2), Mbuyura (K3), Mhukuru (K4), Ruhuhu (K5), and Usili (K6) formations and the informal Manda Beds, which include the Kingori Sandstone (K7) and Lifua Member (K8).

Recent studies have described the Usili Formation as a 260 metres (850 ft) thick fluvio-lacustrine succession made up of a lowermost conglomeratic interval that is approximately 5 meters thick, grading up into a trough cross-bedded, coarse-grained, sandstone-dominated interval that is 25 to 40 metres (82 to 131 ft) thick, overlain by massive nodular siltstone and laminated mudstone beds with minor ribbon sandstones forming the bulk of the succession. Since Parrington (1956), the Usili Formation became widely recognized as a Late Permian formation that correlates with the Teekloof and Balfour formations of South Africa, as well as with the Zambian Upper Madumabisa Mudstone (Cistecephalus AZ). Comparison of Usili tetrapods with those of the lower Beaufort Group has suggested a broad biostratigraphic correlation with the Cistecephalus, Dicynodon, and Tropidostoma assemblage zones. Sidor et al. (2010) recognized only one undivided tetrapod faunal assemblage in the Usili Formation, which includes Aenigmastropheus, temnospondyls, pareiasaurs, gorgonopsians, therocephalians, cynodonts, and dicynodonts, whose remains were collected from various localities. This suggests that several therapsid genera have unequal stratigraphic ranges and temporal durations in the Ruhuhu and Karoo basins. The Kingori Locality is regarded as being equivalent in time to the Lower Daptocephalus Assemblage zone.

Sidor et al. (2010) and Sidor et al. (2013) noted that it is probable that the Chiweta Beds of Malawi and the Usili Formation of Tanzania represent the same rock unit, separated only by political boundaries and geologic faulting (being located on either side of Lake Nyasa). Except for the burnetiid MAL 240, which is unique to the Chiweta Beds, the Usili Formation hosts identical genera, including Aelurognathus, Dicynodontoides, Rhachiocephalus, Endothiodon cf. E. bathystoma, Oudenodon baini, Gorgonops? dixeyi and an indeterminate tusked dicynodont (SAM-PK-7862, SAM-PK-7863).

== Paleobiota ==
=== Tetrapods ===
Color key: Taxon / Reclassified taxon / Taxon falsely reported as present / Dubious taxon or junior synonym / Ichnotaxon / Ootaxon / Morphotaxon	Notes; Uncertain or tentative taxa are in small text; ~~crossed out~~ taxa are discredited.

==== †Temnospondyls ====
Taxon	Species	Locality	Material	Notes	Images
Peltobatrachus	P. pustulatus			A stereospondyl, endemic to this formation.	

==== †Parareptiles ====
Taxon	Species	Locality	Material	Notes	Images
Anthodon	A. serrarius	B18	A specimen	A pareiasaur. Originally named Anthodon minisculus, it was considered a junior synonym of A. serrarius by Lee (1997).	
Pareiasaurus	P. serridens			A pareiasaur.	
Unidentified Parareptilia	Indeterminate		GPIT K72, six or seven dorsal vertebrae with articulated osteoderms	A pareiasaur originally described by von Huene (1944), endemic to this formation.	

==== Eureptiles ====
Taxon	Species	Locality	Material	Notes	Images
Aenigmastropheus	A. parringtoni	B35	UMZC T836, a partial postcranial skeleton including five posterior cervical and anterior dorsal vertebrae, the distal half of the right humerus, a fragment of probable left humeral shaft, the proximal end of the right ulna, and three indeterminate fragments of bone, one of which may represent a partial radius.	A protorosaurid archosauromorph, endemic to this formation.	

==== Therapsids ====
===== †Anomodonts =====
Taxon	Species	Locality	Material	Notes	Images
Compsodon	C. helmoedi	L35, Z04	A highly damaged mandible as well as articulated craniodental remains (skull and mandible)	First preservation of a mandible for this taxon.	
Daptocephalus	D. huenei	B2 (Kingori)	SAM-PK-10630, fragmentary skull and postcrania; 7 additional skulls	A dicynodontoid dicynodont, the holotype was formerly assigned as a species of Dicynodon.	
Daptocephalus	D. leoniceps			A dicynodontoid dicynodont, previously considered to be a species of Dicynodon, known only from South Africa.	
Dicynodon	D. angielczyki		UMZC T1089, a complete skull; 6 additional partial to complete skulls and some possible postcrania	A species named for specimens of Dicynodon formerly assigned to Daptocephalus huenei.	
Dicynodon	D. lacerticeps			A dicynodontoid dicynodont, known only from South Africa.	
Dicynodon	D. robertsi			Originally considered to be a species of Dicynodon, but it is a junior synonym of Oudenodon bainii.	
Dicynodon	D. tealei	B32	SAM-PK-10631, fragmentary skull roof	An indeterminate dicynodont, a nomen dubium.	
Dicynodontoides	D. kubwa			A kingoriid dicynodont, previously considered to be a species of Dicynodon	
Dicynodontoides	D. nowacki	Kingori	GPIT/RE/7174, a nearly complete skull; other skulls and skeletons	A kingoriid dicynodont, previously considered to be a species of Dicynodon	
Endothiodon	E. cf. bathystoma			Basal dicynodont, endothiodontid.	
Endothiodon	E. sp. nov.			A new, yet unnamed species.	
Endothiodon	E. uniseries			Basal dicynodont, endothiodontid. Originally placed in its own genus Esoterodon.	
Euptychognathus	E. bathyrhynchus	Kingori	GPIT/RE/7104 (UT K 19), well preserved partial skull	Basal lystrosaurid dicynodont, previously considered to be a species of Dicynodon.	
Geikia	G. locusticeps		GPIT K87/UT von HUENE 1942 Abb.3, juvenile partial skull and dentary; GPIT K114, skull and dentary	A geikiine cryptodont, previously considered to be a species of Dicynodon.	
Katumbia	K. parringtoni	B19 (Kingori); B4 (Katumbi); Usili-Berges	GPIT K120/UT Huene 1942 S.155, fragmentary skull; UMZC T761, UMZC T791, incomplete skulls; A dentary	Basal dicynodontoid, endemic to this formation.	
Kawingasaurus	K. fossilis	Kingori	UT K 52, skull and dentary; UT K 56, skull; UT K 55, 5 skulls and postcrania	A cistecephalid dicynodont, endemic to this formation.	
Mdomowabata	M. trilobops		Many partial to complete skulls, a partial skeleton	A cryptodont dicynodont, endemic to this formation.	
Oudenodon	O. bainii		Many skulls	Basal oudenodontid cryptodont.	
Pachytegos	P. stockleyi	B32	SAM 10639, SAM 10642, fragmentary skull elements	Basal dicynodont, endothiodontid, endemic to this formation.	
Pristerodon	P. mackayi		NMT RB38	Basal dicynodont, eumantellid. Previous reports by King (1988, 1992), King and Rubidge (1993), and Gay and Cruickshank (1999) were based on the holotype specimen of Katumbia parringtoni. The first diagnostic specimen of Pristerodon mackayi from this formation, NMT RB38, was discovered in 2008.	
Rhachiocephalus	R. behemoth		GPIT K 15, nearly complete skull; GPIT K 15B, fragmentary skull	A rhachiocephalid cryptodont.	
Rhachiocephalus	R. magnus		Many specimens	A rhachiocephalid cryptodont.	
Unidentified cryptodont	Indeterminate		NMT RB22, a partial maxilla	An unidentified dicynodont from the base of the formation, originally thought to be a specimen of what is now Mdomowabata.	

===== †Biarmosuchians =====
Taxon	Locality	Material	Notes	Images
Burnetiidae indet.		NMT RB4, partial isolated skull roof; NMT RB36, fragmentary right dorsal margin of the orbit	A burnetiid most closely related to Burnetia mirabilis from the Dicynodon AZ of South Africa. Too fragmentary to be assigned to a new taxon, its morphology is unique among Cistecephalus AZ taxa.	

===== Cynodonts =====
Taxon	Species	Locality	Material	Notes	Images
Procynosuchus	P. delaharpeae		IGP K 92, fragmentary skull	A procynosuchid	

===== †Therocephalians =====
Taxon	Species	Locality	Material	Notes	Images
Silphictidoides	S. ruhuhuensis	Kingori	K 70, nearly complete skull and dentary; K 125, nearly complete skull, dentary and right humerus	A baurioid, endemic to this formation.	
Theriognathus	T. microps	Kingori	K 107 and K 84, two fragmentary skulls	A whaitsiid	

===== †Gorgonopsians =====
Taxon	Species	Locality	Material	Notes	Images
Cyonosaurus	C. broomianus			A gorgonopsian	
Dinogorgon	D. rubidgei	Kingori	IGP K 16, nearly complete skull and dentary	A gorgonopsid, endemic to this formation.	
Gorgonops	G. sp.			A gorgonopsid	
Inostrancevia	I. africana		NMT RB380, an isolated left premaxilla	A gorgonopsid	
Lycaenops	L. sp.			A gorgonopsid	
Njalila	N. nasuta		IGP K 52, nearly complete skull; IGP K 96, fragmentary skull; 6 more skulls	A gorgonopsid, endemic to this formation.	
Rubidgea	R. atrox		IGP K 46, fragmentary skull	A gorgonopsid, formally named Broomicephalus, endemic to this formation.	
Ruhuhucerberus	R. haughtoni	Katumbi, B4	MZC T891, nearly complete skull	A gorgonopsid, endemic to this formation.	
Sauroctonus	S. parringtoni	Usili-Berges	IGP U 28, complete skull and dentary and fragmentary skeleton	A gorgonopsid, endemic to this formation.	
Scylacops	S. capensis	Kingori, B19	MZC T885/FRP 93, skull and cervical vertebrae	A gorgonopsid	
Sycosaurus	S. nowaki	Kingori	IGP K 47, nearly complete skull	A gorgonopsid, endemic to this formation.	
