= Euptychognathus =

Euptychognathus Temporal range: Late Permian (Wuchiapingian–Changhsingian) ~256.6–252 Ma (approx.)

Scientific classification
- Kingdom: Animalia
- Phylum: Chordata
- Clade: Synapsida
- Clade: Therapsida
- Clade: †Anomodontia
- Clade: †Dicynodontia
- Family: †Lystrosauridae
- Genus: †Euptychognathus; Kammerer et al. 2011

Type species
- †Euptychognathus bathyrhynchus (von Huene 1942)

Other species
- †Euptychognathus kingae Kammerer et al. 2025

Synonyms
- Dicynodon bathyrhynchus von Huene 1942

Extinct genus of dicynodonts

Euptychognathus (lit. 'well-folded jaw') is a genus of lystrosaurid dicynodont, an extinct type of therapsid (a group that modern mammals also belong to). The type species E. bathyrhynchus was first named in 1942 as a species of Dicynodon, D. bathyrhynchus, but was not recognised as being its own genus until 2011. Although relatively rare, fossils of Euptychognathus have been discovered in multiple different formations across several countries, including the Usili Formation in Tanzania, the Madumabisa Mudstone Formation of Zambia, and the Balfour Formation of the Karoo Basin in South Africa.

Two species of Euptychognathus are recognised, the type species E. bathyrhynchus and E. kingae. Both are very similar anatomically and largely differ in skull proportions—E. bathyrhynchus has a taller, narrower skull, while E. kingae has a shallower but much wider head. Euptychognathus is a member of the family Lystrosauridae and closely related to the well-known Lystrosaurus and shares some of its distinctive traits, particularly the deflected shape of the snout. Euptychognathus was one of the first lystrosaurids to be definitively recognised from the Permian, and demonstrates that the unusual morphology associated with Lystrosaurus evolved before the ecological disruptions of the Permian-Triassic mass extinction. The widespread range of Euptychognathus despite its relative rarity is unusual for a Permian dicynodont, as many species appear to be locally endemic to individual and immediately adjacent basins.

Although typically recognised as lystrosaurid, the precise relationships of Euptychognathus have not been settled in phylogenetic analyses over the years, including some that placed it outside of Lystrosauridae altogether. The discovery of more specimens of Euptychognathus as well as other Permian lystrosaurids (Madumabisa, Lystrosauravus) have helped to resolve the interrelationships and evolution of lystrosaurids, which re-affirm the inclusion of Euptychognathus in the group.

== History of discovery ==
=== Euptychognathus bathyrhynchus ===
While the genus Euptychognathus was not named until 2011, fossils of Euptychognathus have been known since the middle of the 20th century. In 1942, German palaeontologist Friedrich von Huene named a new species of Dicynodon, Dicynodon bathyrhynchus, from a single skull (GPIT-PV-117020) discovered in what is now recognised as the Usili Formation in Tanzania. The skull was discovered Ernst Nowack on an expedition to the Usili Formation with his wife Maria Nowack between 1934 and 1936, who sent the skull to Germany to be examined. Von Huene named the new species for its distinctively deep snout, which resembles that of another dicynodont, Lystrosaurus. At the time, the genus Dicynodon acted as a taxonomic wastebasket that many species of Permian dicynodonts were dumped into, often over-split into an excessive number of species.

The validity of D. bathyrhynchus was contested during subsequent attempts to revise the taxonomy of Dicynodon, with some authors considering it a valid species (e.g. Sidney H. Haughton and Adrian Smuts Brink in 1954, Gillian King in 1988) while others synonymised it with Dicynodon lacerticeps (e.g. Brink in 1986). One of the major issues affecting the matter is that the skull has been heavily reconstructed with plaster, with a particularly large section of skull below the naris (nostril opening) being entirely reconstructed and putting its proportions into question.

In 2011, palaeontologists Christian F. Kammerer, Kenneth D. Angielczyk and Jörg Fröbisch thoroughly revised the taxonomy of Dicynodon, including the status of D. bathyrhynchus. The species was almost declared to be invalid until they recognised two additional skulls matching the holotype specimen in the collections of the Council for Geoscience (CGP) in Pretoria, South Africa (CGP AF107-83 and CGP/1/310), as well as a third skull in the collections of the University of California, Berkeley (UCMP 42714). These three skulls are better preserved and more complete, and confirm the unusual and distinctive proportions of the holotype specimen GPIT-PV-117020. From their revised taxonomy, it was clear that this species did not belong to the genus Dicynodon.

Without any existing available names for this species, Kammerer and colleagues named the new genus Euptychognathus with the new combination Euptychognathus bathyrhynchus as the type species. The name means lit. 'well-folded jaw' and combines the Ancient Greek words ευ ("good, well"), "πτυχoς" (translated as "folded"), and γνάθος ("jaw"). The name is a literal description of the distinct downwardly deflected snout, but also alludes to the name Ptychognathus—the original name given to Lystrosaurus by Richard Owen in 1860, but already preoccupied by a genus of freshwater crab.

While the original holotype specimen was discovered in Tanzania, these three additional specimens all come from the Karoo Basin in South Africa. Several more specimens have also been discovered and recognised since 2011, including five more from South Africa (RC 401, RC 464, RC 533, RC 798 and SAM-PK-K11781), another from Tanzania (NMT RB1213), one from the Luangwa Valley in Zambia (NHMUK PV R 37079) and one from the Zambezi River Valley of uncertain province, either hailing from either Zambia or Zimbabwe (NHMUK PV R 36715). The majority consist only of skulls and lower jaws, and only SAM-PK-K11781 from South Africa preserves any of the postcranial skeleton—a series of nine partial vertebrae and part of a single rib.

=== Euptychognathus kingae ===
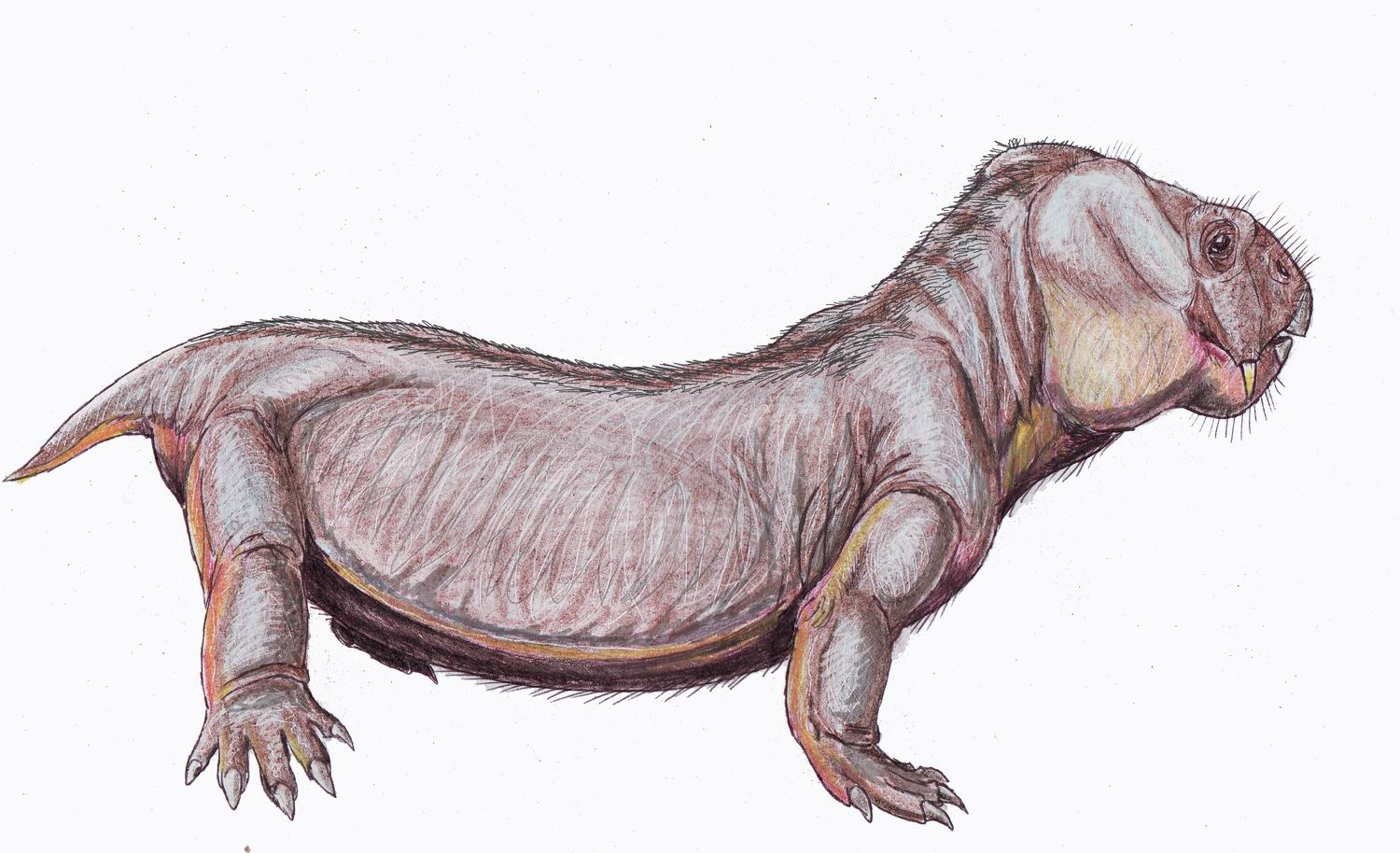
Artist's interpretation of Euptychognathus kingae

In 1974, specimens of dicynodonts were collected by a joint expedition from the University of Oxford and the Geological Survey of Zambia in the Luangwa Basin of Zambia. The expedition included British palaeontologist Thomas S. Kemp, and many of the specimens collected were placed in his collection (TSK) in Oxford, UK. Among the many specimens collected was the nearly complete skeleton of a dicynodont, formerly catalogued as TSK 14 but now accessioned in the Natural History Museum, London as NHMUK PV R 37005. TSK 14 was thoroughly described by British palaeontologist Gillian King in 1981. She identified NHMUK PV R 37005 as a specimen of Dicynodon trigonocephalus, a species originally described from South Africa, as they both had similarly short and broad skulls with wide temporal fenestra, among other features.

When Kammerer and colleagues revised the taxonomy of Dicynodon in 2011, they determined that the unusual proportions of the holotype of D. trigonocephalus was due to compression of the skull, and that in fact is a distorted specimen of D. lacerticeps, synonymising the two species. They also assigned all dicynodontoid (a dicynodont subgroup that includes Dicynodon and its close relatives) specimens from Tanzania and Zambia, including NMHUK PV R 37005, to Dicynodon huenei (a species originally recognised from Tanzania). This assessment was reaffirmed by a team of authors in 2014 re-examining dicynodonts from the Luangwa Basin.

Size of Euptychognathus kingae, based on NHMUK PV R 37005

D. huenei itself would come under revision in 2019 by Kammerer, who now recognised the species as belonging to the genus Daptocephalus instead. However, he also acknowledged that he and other authors had been overly conservative in lumping all the Tanzanian and Zambian dicynodontoids under the single species D. huenei. He restricted D. huenei to only some specimens from Tanzania, and recognised other Tanzanian specimens as belonging to a new species of Dicynodon (D. angielczyki). The taxonomy and affinities of the Zambian specimens, namely NHMUK PV R 37005, was left up in air, however, but were implicitly stated to not belong to either of the two species recognised from Tanzania and that they were being re-examined.

The taxonomy of NHMUK PV R 37005 and other Zambian dicynodontoids was finally revised in 2025 by Kammerer, Angielczyk and Fröbisch, where they were recognised as belonging to multiple species of lystrosaurids. This revision followed a series of expeditions to the Luangwa Basin from 2009 to 2019 by a multi-institutional research group studying the Permo-Triassic fossils of eastern Africa, which collected additional specimens of the Zambian "Dicynodon trigonocephalus" represented by NHMUK PV R 37005. Kammerer and colleagues identified these specimens as belonging to a new species of Euptychognathus. They named the new species Euptychognathus kingae in honour of Gillian King for her work describing and analysing the skeleton of the species in 1981, among her many other contributions to the study of dicynodonts.

Although NHMUK PV R 37005 is a nearly complete skeleton, its skull is damaged, and so Kammerer and colleagues opted to designate NHCC LB200, a better preserved skull and mandible, as the holotype specimen. As of 2025, this specimen is held in the National Heritage Conservation Commission (NHCC) in Lusaka, Zambia, but will be permanently housed in Zambia's Livingstone Museum. They also recognised another specimen collected by Kemp in 1974 (a partial snout) in the collections of the Natural History Museum, UK, as E. kingae (NHMUK PV R 37190, formerly TSK 36), as well as referring two more recently collected but unprepared specimens from Zambia (NHCC LB1045 and NHCC LB1069) to the species.

=== Geological background ===
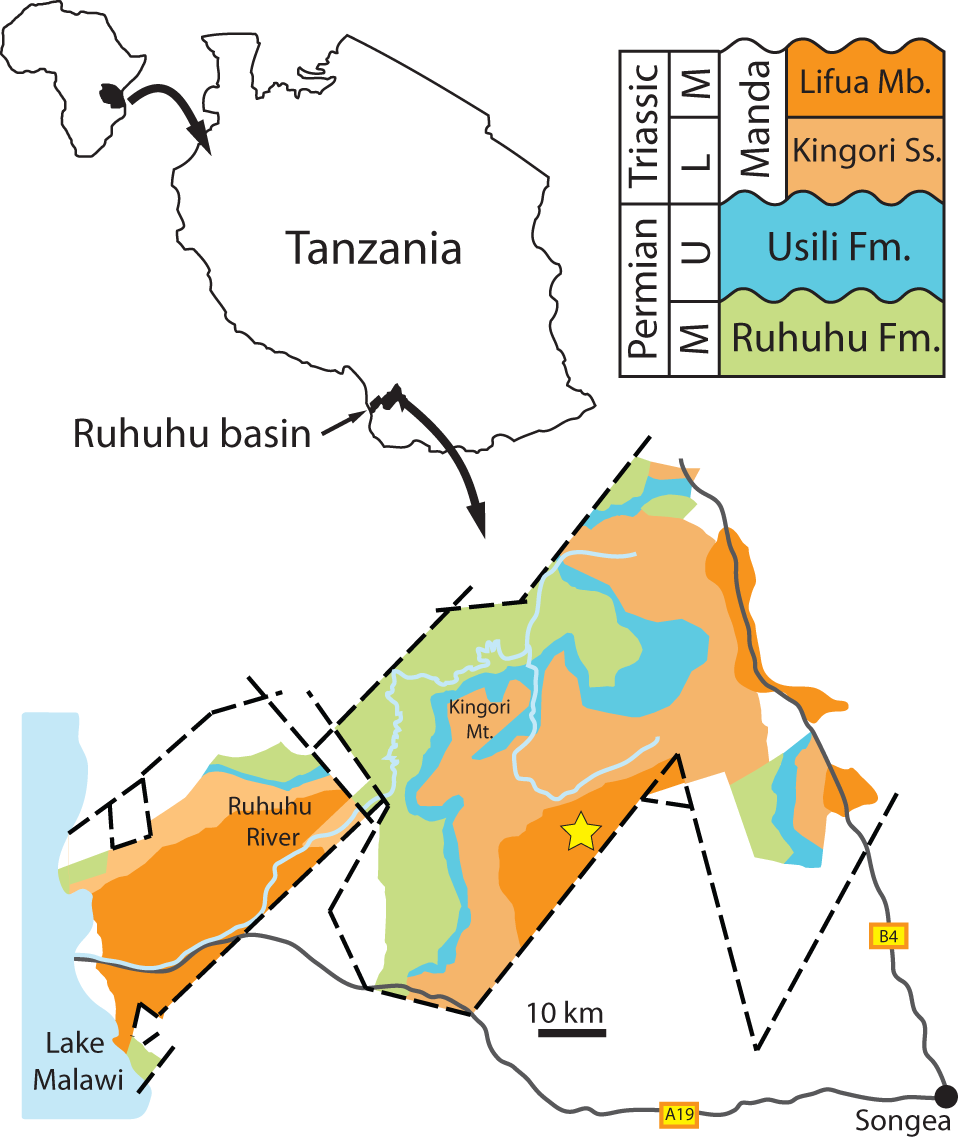
Geological map of the Ruhuhu Basin with the Usili Formation in blue, where the holotype of Euptychognathus was discovered

Unlike many other Permian dicynodontoids, fossils of Euptychognathus are known from multiple sedimentary basins across several different countries. In Tanzania, where it was originally discovered, E. bathyrhynchus is known from the Usili Formation of the Ruhuhu Basin, in Zambia from the Madumabisa Mudstone Formation of the Luangwa Basin as well as the Zambezi Basin, which straddles both Zambia and Zimbabwe. The South African records come from the Balfour Formation, part of the historic Beaufort Group of the Karoo Basin. The stratigraphy of the Beaufort Group has been well-studied and subdivided into a series of discrete biozones with distinct faunal assemblages, which can be correlated with other basins globally, particularly southern and eastern Africa. Despite being widespread across multiple basins, the comparative rarity of Euptychognathus fossils has historically made it unsuited for biostratigraphic correlations.

In the Karoo, the stratigraphic range of Euptychognathus has not been strictly determined, but specimens of E. bathyrhynchus have been recovered from deposits that cover the Cistecephalus and Daptocephalus Assemblage Zones. These assemblage zones have been radiometrically dated to 256.6 ± 0.1 million years ago at the base of the Cistecephalus AZ to roughly 252 million years ago at the top of the Daptocephalus AZ (coinciding with the end of the Permian period), bracketing the age of Euptychognathus to within this timespan. The ages of the upper Madumabisa Mudstone and Usili formations have not been precisely dated and correlating them with the biozones of the Karoo Basin has been inconsistent. Recent work following the expeditions from 2009-19 indicates that both the Madumabisa Mudstone and Usili formations in part correlate to the upper Cistecephalus and lower Daptocephalus AZs. Such an age range is consistent with the ages of Euptychognathus from the Karoo Basin.

The range of E. kingae appears to be much more restricted, as it has only been recovered from the uppermost strata of the upper Madumabisa Mudstone Formation. The upper unit of the Madumabisa Mudstone Formation is itself already correlated to the Daptocephalus AZ, and the uppermost layers that are abundant with E. kingae (as well as fellow lystrosaurid Madumabisa) may represent an upper sub-assemblage mirroring the Lystrosaurus-rich upper subzone of the Daptocephalus AZ (the Lystrosaurus maccaigi-Moschorhinus Subzone).
