= Bondoceras =

Bondoceras Temporal range: Guadalupian?

Scientific classification
- Domain: Eukaryota
- Kingdom: Animalia
- Phylum: Chordata
- Clade: Synapsida
- Clade: Therapsida
- Suborder: †Biarmosuchia
- Family: †Burnetiidae
- Genus: †Bondoceras; Sidor, 2023
- Species: †B. bulborhynchus

Binomial name
- †Bondoceras bulborhynchus Sidor, 2023

Extinct genus of therapsids

Bondoceras is genus of burnetiid therapsid discovered in Zambia and first described in 2023. The only species described is Bondoceras bulborhynchus.

The genus name Bondoceras is derived from "Bondo", a village near the fossil localities, and "ceras", ancient Greek for horn. The species name bulborhynchus refers to the distinctive hemispherical median nasal boss present on the snout.

Bondoceras was collected from several localities southwest of Chamwe, Gwembe District, Southern Province, Zambia. The presence of tapinocephalid teeth near the localities suggests a Guadalupian age for the fossils.
