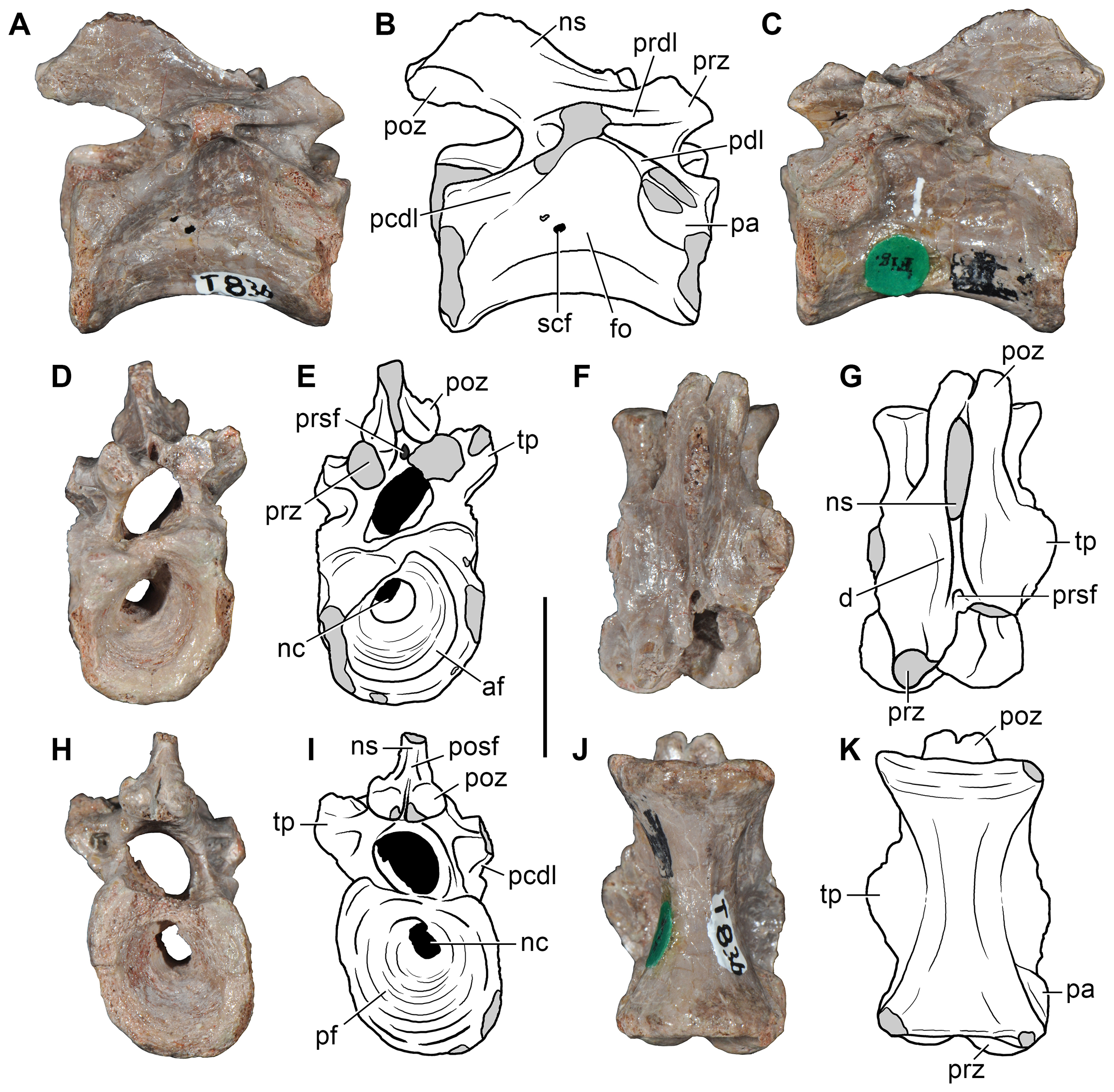
- Cervical vertebrae

Scientific classification
- Kingdom: Animalia
- Phylum: Chordata
- Class: Reptilia
- Clade: Archosauromorpha
- Genus: †Aenigmastropheus; Ezcurra et al., 2014

Type species
- †Aenigmastropheus parringtoni Ezcurra et al., 2014

= Aenigmastropheus =

Aenigmastropheus Temporal range: Lopingian, 254.7 Ma

Extinct genus of reptiles

Aenigmastropheus is an extinct genus of early archosauromorph reptiles known from the middle Late Permian Usili Formation of Songea District, southern Tanzania. It contains a single species, Aenigmastropheus parringtoni, known solely from UMZC T836, a partial postcranial skeleton of a mature individual. It was collected in 1933, and first described in 1956, as a "problematic reptile" due to its unique morphology. Therefore, a binomial name was erected for this specimen in 2014. Aenigmastropheus was probably fully terrestrial.

== Discovery ==
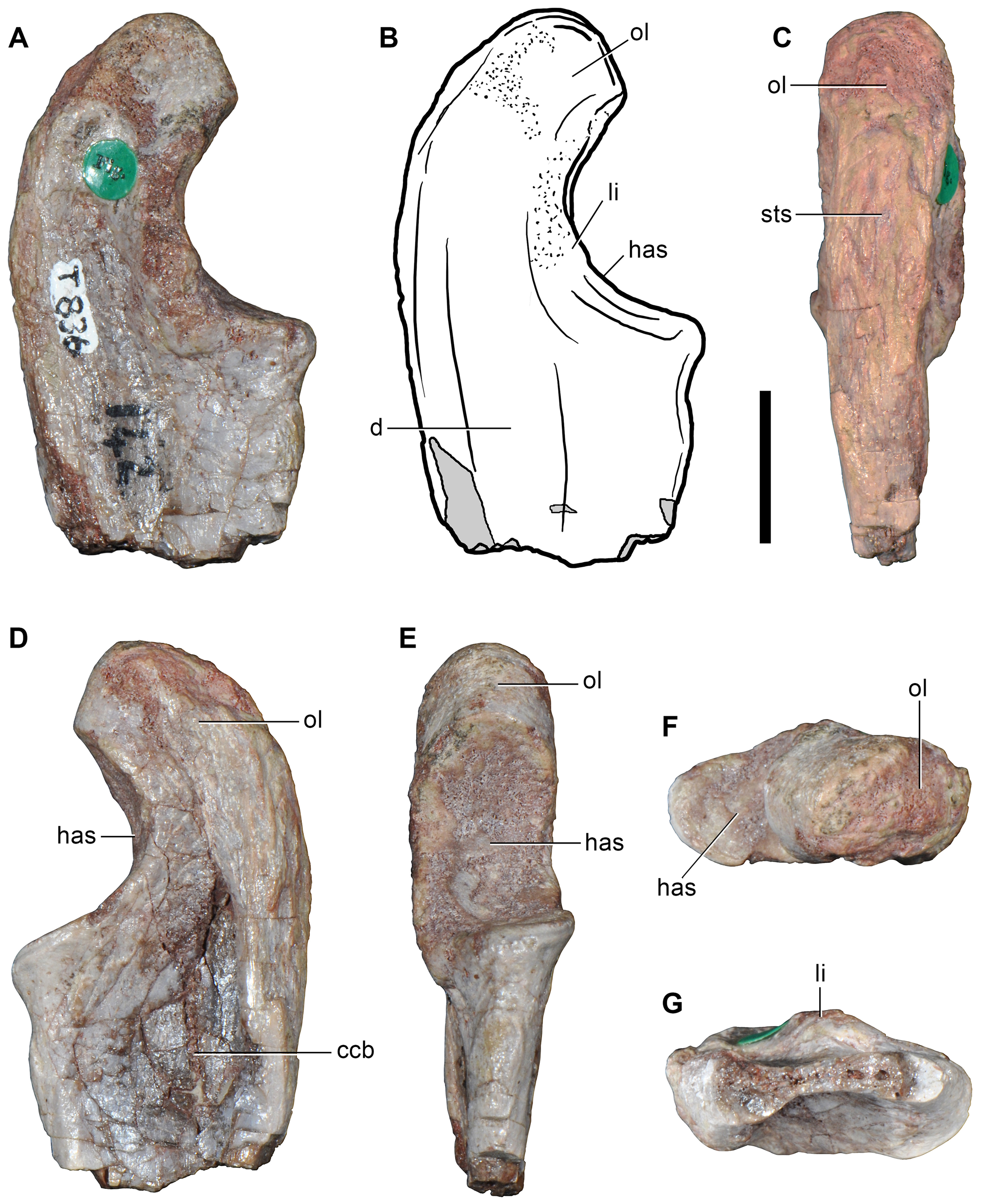
Proximal end of the right ulna

Fossils of Aenigmastropheus were first described by the British paleontologist Dr. Francis Rex Parrington in 1956, in an article titled as "A problematic reptile from the Upper Permian". Parrington reported collecting these remains in the Ruhuhu Valley in the Songea District of southern Tanzania in 1933, and considered them to come from a single individual. This specimen, UMZC T836, in currently housed at the University Museum of Zoology, in Cambridge, UK. UMZC T836 consists of a partial postcranial skeleton including five posterior cervical and anterior dorsal vertebrae, the distal half of the right humerus, a fragment of probable left humeral shaft, the proximal end of the right ulna, and three indeterminate fragments of bone, one of which may represent a partial radius.

In his article, Parrington (1956) highlighted the apparent contrast between the primitive appearance of the forelimb bones and the more derived appearance of the vertebrae, resembling those of archosaurs. Thus, he concluded that the specimen did not bear close resemblances to any known synapsid, including the ones collected at the same locality, and suggested possible close affinities with archosaurs due to the vertebral morphology and the presence of hollow limb bones and an ectepicondylar groove on the humerus. Hughes (1963) subsequently noted similar vertebral morphology in some "pelycosaurian" synapsids and concluded that, as the combination of a derived vertebral column and a primitive limb structure occurs in proterosuchian archosauromorphs, UMZC T836 might possibly be a proterosuchian ancestor. Subsequent studies came to a similar conclusion, listing the specimen as a possible member of Proterosuchidae, however Gower and Sennikov (2000) noted that it still could possibly be archosaurian. Ezcurra, Butler and Gower (2013) indicated that UMZC T836 is an archosauromorph likely not referable to Archosauriformes, and thus not proterosuchian. Aenigmastropheus was first erected for UMZC T836 by Martín D. Ezcurra, Torsten M. Scheyer and Richard J. Butler in 2014 and the type species is Aenigmastropheus parringtoni, following a re-description of this "problematic reptile". The generic name is derived from aenigma, "enigmatic" in Latin, and stropheus, "vertebra" in Greek, in allusion to the problematic taxonomic history of the holotype and only known specimen. The specific name, parringtoni, honors Dr. Francis Rex Parrington for the discovery and initial description of UMZC T836, and for his contribution to the understanding of Permo-Triassic amniotes.

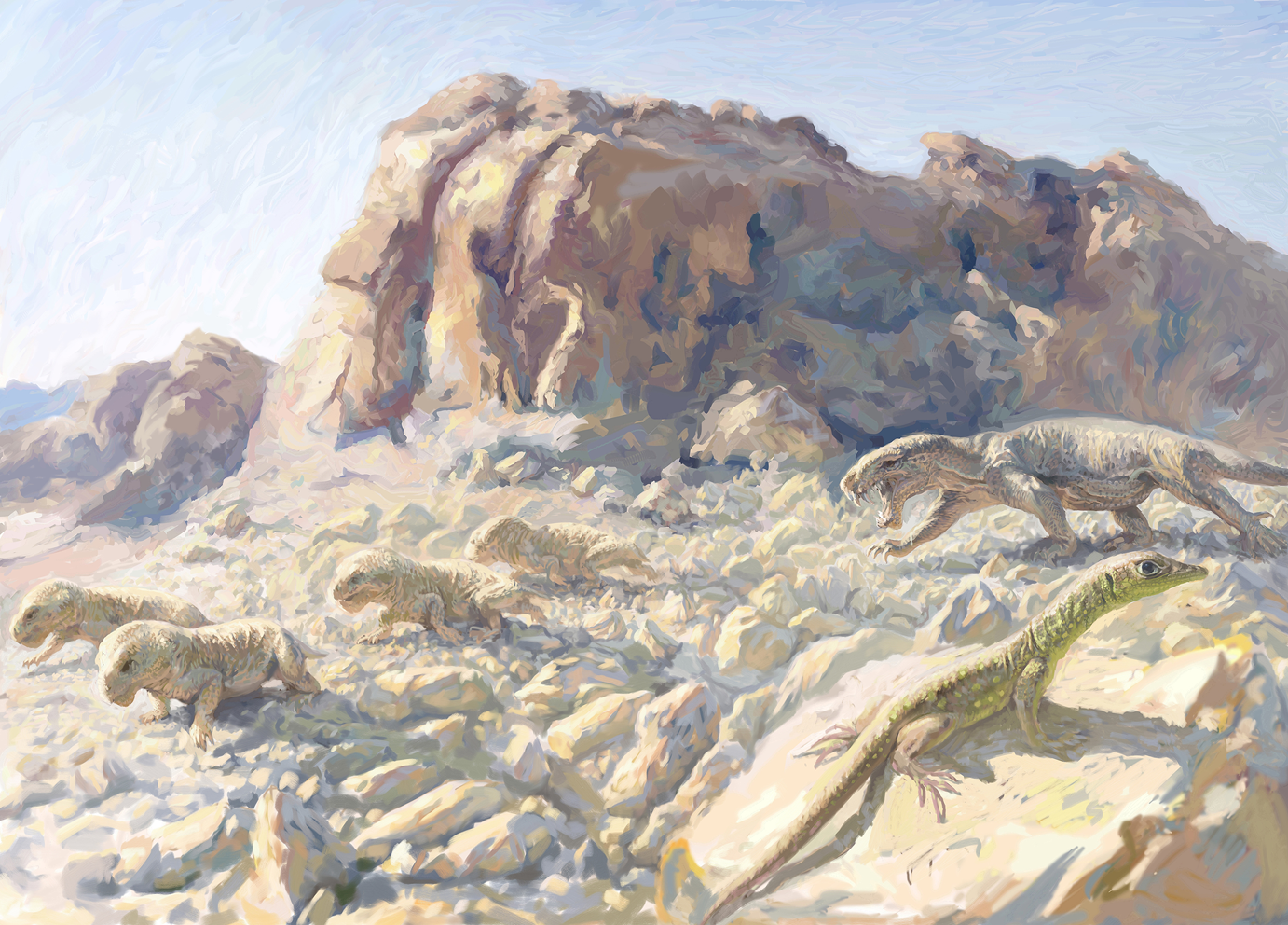
Restoration of Aenigmastropheus (lower right) and other animals from locality B35 of the Usili Formation

UMZC T836 was collected in fossil-bearing levels that correspond to locality B35 of Stockley (1932), which is located close to the road near the town of Ruanda in the Songea District, part of the "Lower Bone Bed" corresponding to his K6 horizon of the Songea Series. This outcrop is currently assigned to the upper part of the Usili Formation, formerly known as the Kawinga Formation, of the Songea Group of the Ruhuhu Basin. Recent studies have described this formation as a 260 meters thick fluviolacustrine succession made up of a lowermost conglomeratic interval that is approximately 5 meters thick, grading up into a trough cross-bedded, coarse-grained, sandstone-dominated interval that is 25–40 meters thick, overlain by massive nodular siltstone and laminated mudstone beds with minor ribbon sandstones forming the bulk of the succession. Sidor et al. (2010) recognized only one tetrapod faunal assemblage in the Usili Formation, which includes, in addition to Aenigmastropheus, temnospondyls, pareiasaurs, gorgonopsians, therocephalians, cynodonts, and dicynodonts. Based on UMZC catalogue and unpublished field notes of Parrington in UMZC collections, an isolated maxilla of a dicynodont listed as cf. "Esoterodon" uniseries (UMZC T969, now Endothiodon), as well as other dicynodont (UMZC T779, T1170) and gorgonopsid (UMZC T882, T883) remains, were collected at locality B35, along with UMZC T836.

Based on the possible presence of Endothiodon, and the more recently described presence of the dicynodonts Dicynodon huenei and possibly Katumbia parringtoni, the faunistic associations of Usili Formation appear to directly correlated with these of the Zambian Upper Madumabisa Mudstone. The well-supported correlation of the later with the rocks of the Cistecephalus Assemblage Zone in the South African Karoo Basin implies that the Usili Formation can be considered a lateral equivalent of this assemblage zone. Therefore, the Usili Formation spans the middle–late Wuchiapingian stage of the middle Late Permian, approximately 260–255 million years ago.

== Description ==
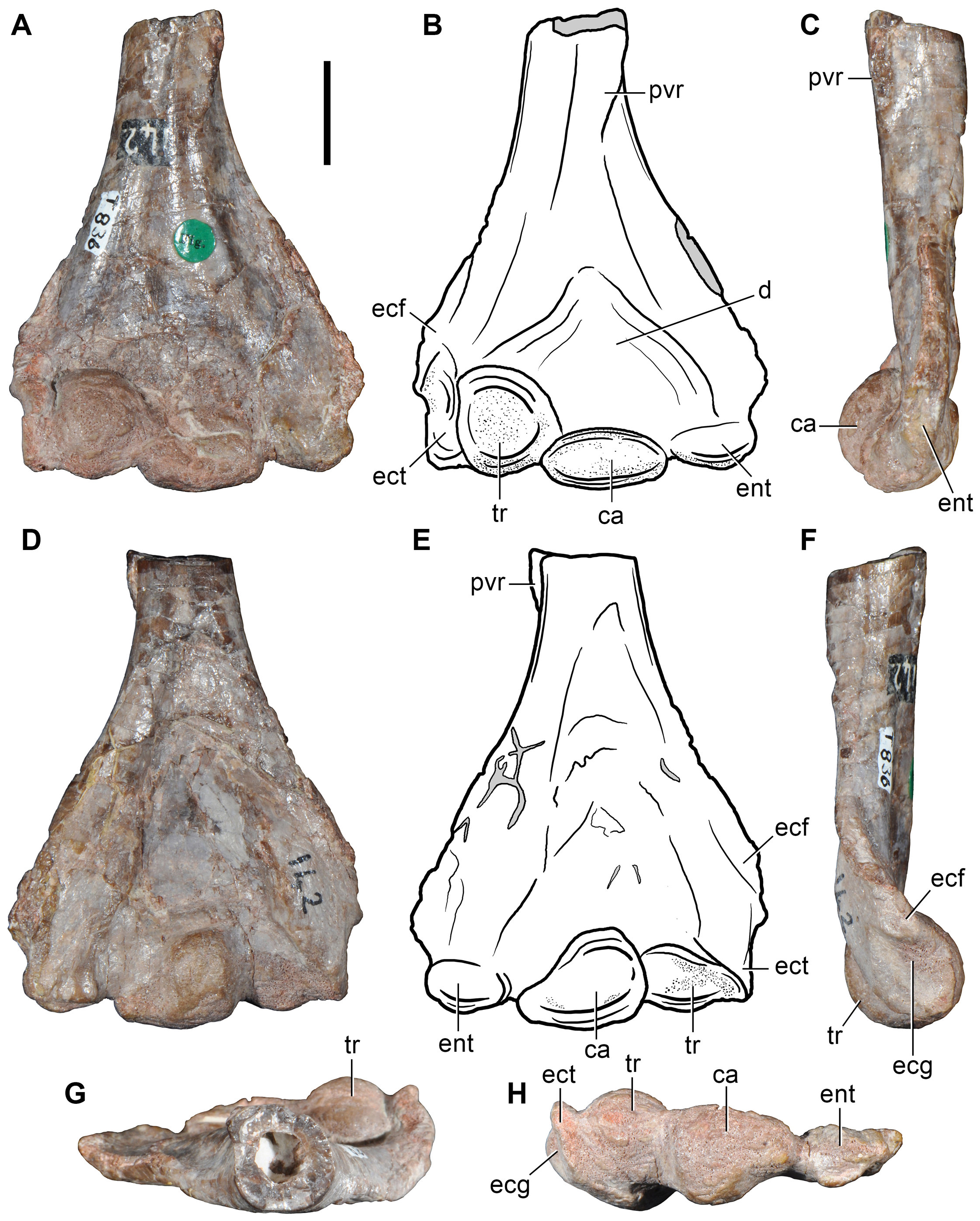
Distal half of the right humerus

Aenigmastropheus is known solely from its holotype, a partial postcranial skeleton. The bones are mostly well preserved, but possess some damaged surfaces, some of which possibly result from preparation with acetic acid. The cortical bone has collapsed or has broken away, and some degree of post-mortem distortion is evident in a few areas of some bones, most notably in the vertebrae. Ezcurra et al. (2014) agreed with Parrington (1956) that all the bones catalogued as UMZC T836 to belong to the same individual. This is supported by the congruent morphology and similar size of the five preserved vertebrae, as well as the right humerus and ulna. The ratio between certain measurements of the axial and appendicular elements also supports this interpretation.

Aenigmastropheus was a medium-sized archosauromorph saurian. Its unique combination of traits that complicates the assessment of its relationships, resulting in Parrington (1956) referring to it as a "problematic reptile", enable differentiating it from any other known amniotes. Its posterior cervical and anterior dorsal vertebrae are notochordal, unlike in other basal archosauromorphs, but with well-developed anterior and posterior centrodiapophyseal and prezygodiapophyseal laminae and zygapophyses that are positioned close to each other medially, unlike in non-archosauromorph reptiles. In side view, its vertebrae have low neural arches with nearly triangular neural spines, unlike the enigmatic neodiapsid Helveticosaurus zollingeri. The humerus of Aenigmastropheus has a thick posteroventral, diagonal ridge on the anterior surface of the shaft, an autapomorphy that is unique to this taxon among basal diapsids. The humerus also lacks entepicondylar (unlike non-archosauromorph reptiles) and ectepicondylar foramina, and shows strongly developed capitellum and trochlea (unlike Helveticosaurus). Finally, its olecranon process is strongly developed, forming a single ossification with the rest of the ulna, unlike other stem archosaurs and Helveticosaurus.

== Paleobiology ==
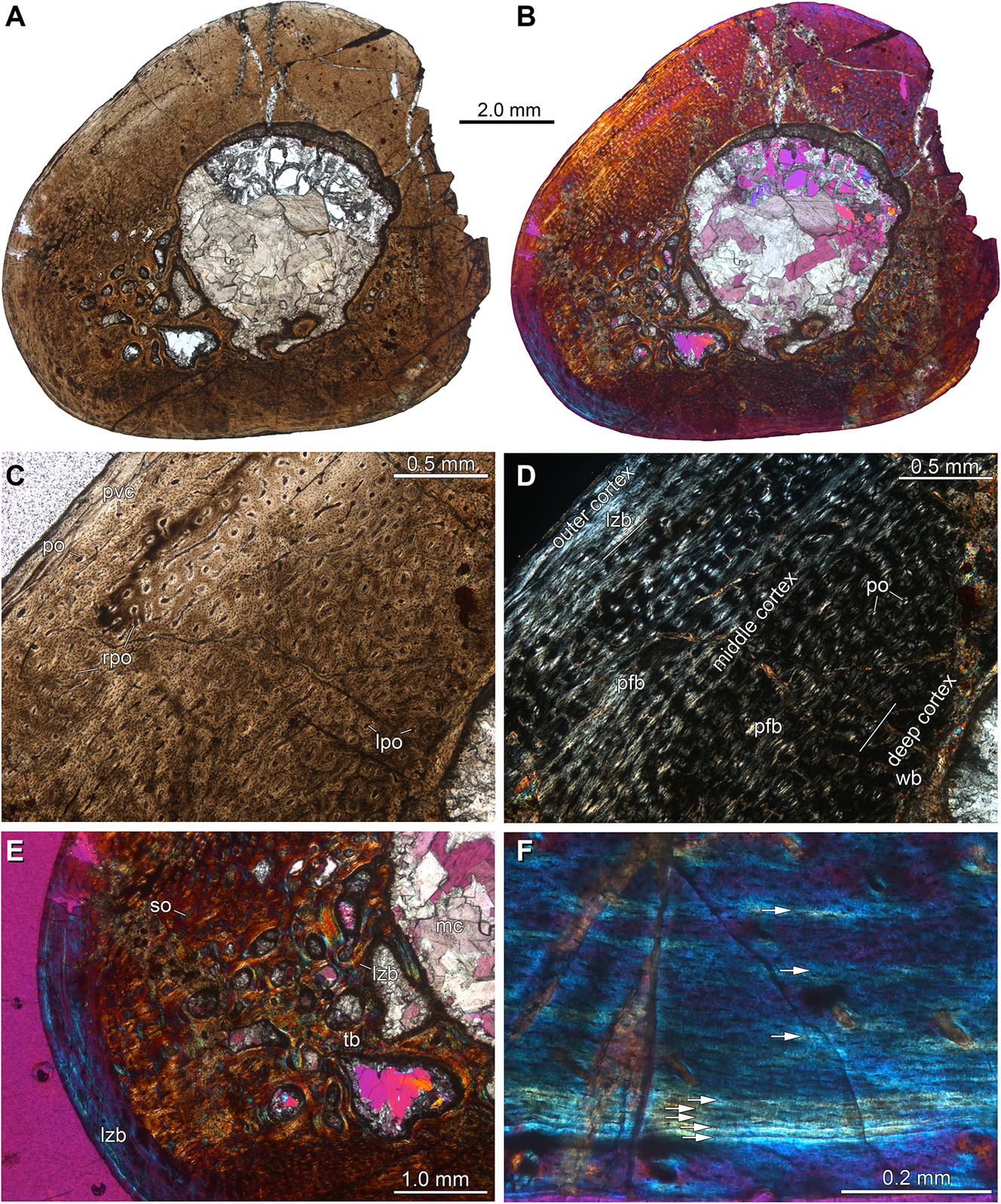
Histological slices

Ezcurra et al. (2014) performed bone histology on the remains of Aenigmastropheus in order to better understand the paleobiology of early archosauromorphs. As evident from the short period of fibrolamellar bone formation, Aenigmastropheus exhibited high growth rates during its early development. However, it was growing more slowly for most of its life, as indicated by the steady decrease in vascularization as well as the increase in spatial organization of the bone matrix up until the formation of lamellar-zonal bone. Ezcurra et al. (2014) noted that the rapid growth during early development observed in Aenigmastropheus resembles those of Prolacerta broomi and the basal archosauriforms Proterosuchus fergusi, Erythrosuchus africanus and Chanaresuchus bonapartei, while extant lepidosauromorphs and the basal archosauromorphs Trilophosaurus buettneri and rhynchosaurs exhibit a slow overall growth pattern. This suggests that even among basal members of Archosauromorpha, diverse growth strategies were already present.

UMZC T836 was likely not a juvenile individual as it has closed neurocentral sutures, but possibly also not fully-grown, as in at least some elements like the fifth vertebra, the notochordal canal is still connected to the neural canal through an hourglass-shaped opening. Histology suggests that UMZC T836 may have reached skeletal maturity, as closely spaced growth marks are present in the lamellar-zonal bone of the outer part of the cortex. It is not known why the outermost thin layer of bone directly below the external bone surface does not show these marks, interpreted as an outer circumferential layer. If they are truly absent, not simply obscured, this would argue against such interpretation indicating that this individual had a prolonged period in life of several years as an adult in which it experienced unfavorable growth conditions, like nutritional shortage, drought or disease, leading to limited growth.

Ezcurra et al. (2014) suggested a fully terrestrial mode of life for Aenigmastropheus, as was already supported by gut content for its relative Protorosaurus speneri. The ratio between the inner diameter and outer diameter of the humerus of Aenigmastropheus was found to be consistent with that of some bones of terrestrial basal archosauriforms, such as the humerus and tibia of Euparkeria capensis and the fibula of Proterosuchus fergusi, while considerably smaller ratio is observed in aquatic and semi-aquatic animals. Furthermore, the strongly developed distal humeral condyles and olecranon process of the ulna also suggest a fully terrestrial mode of life.

== Phylogeny ==
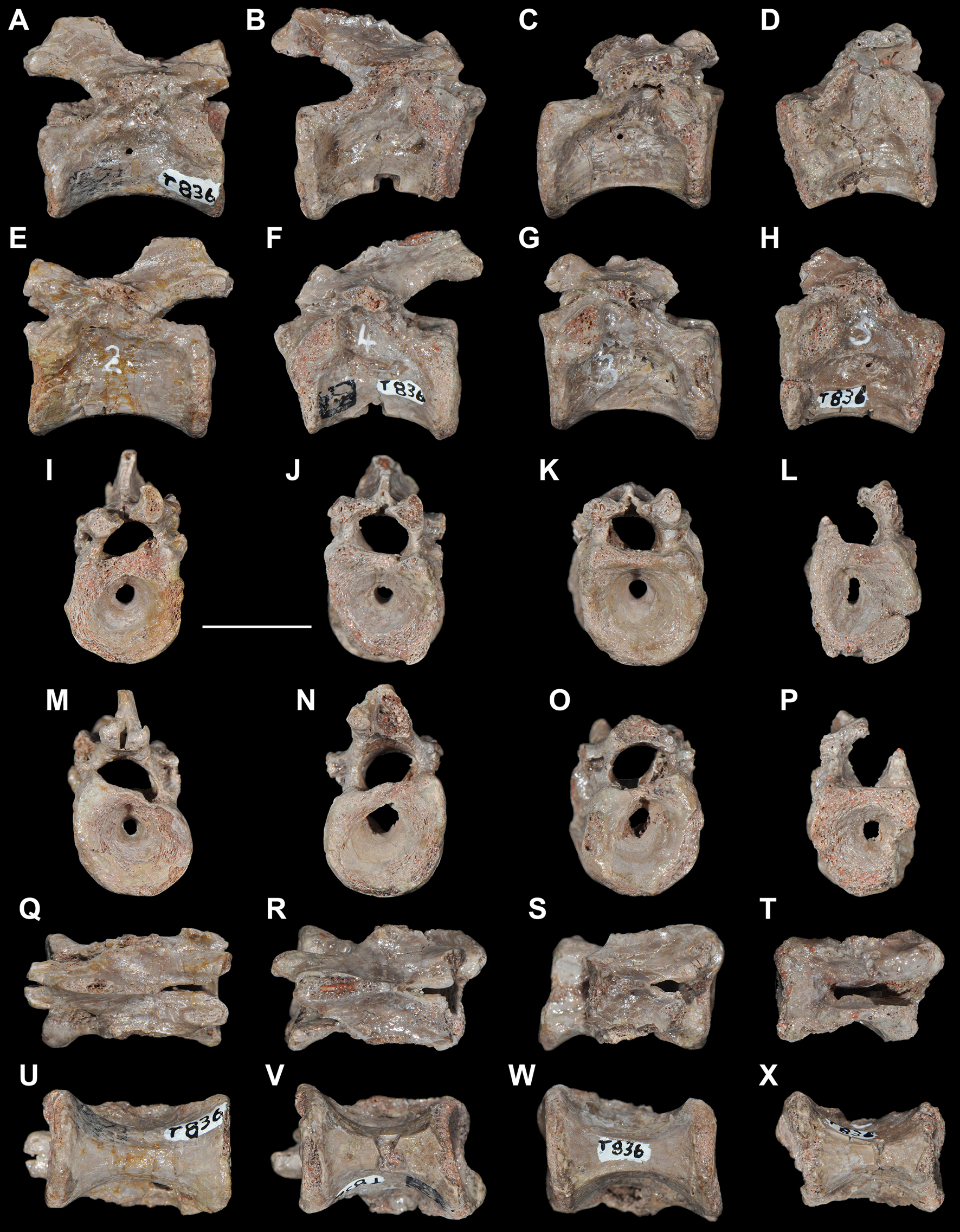
Cervico-dorsal vertebrae

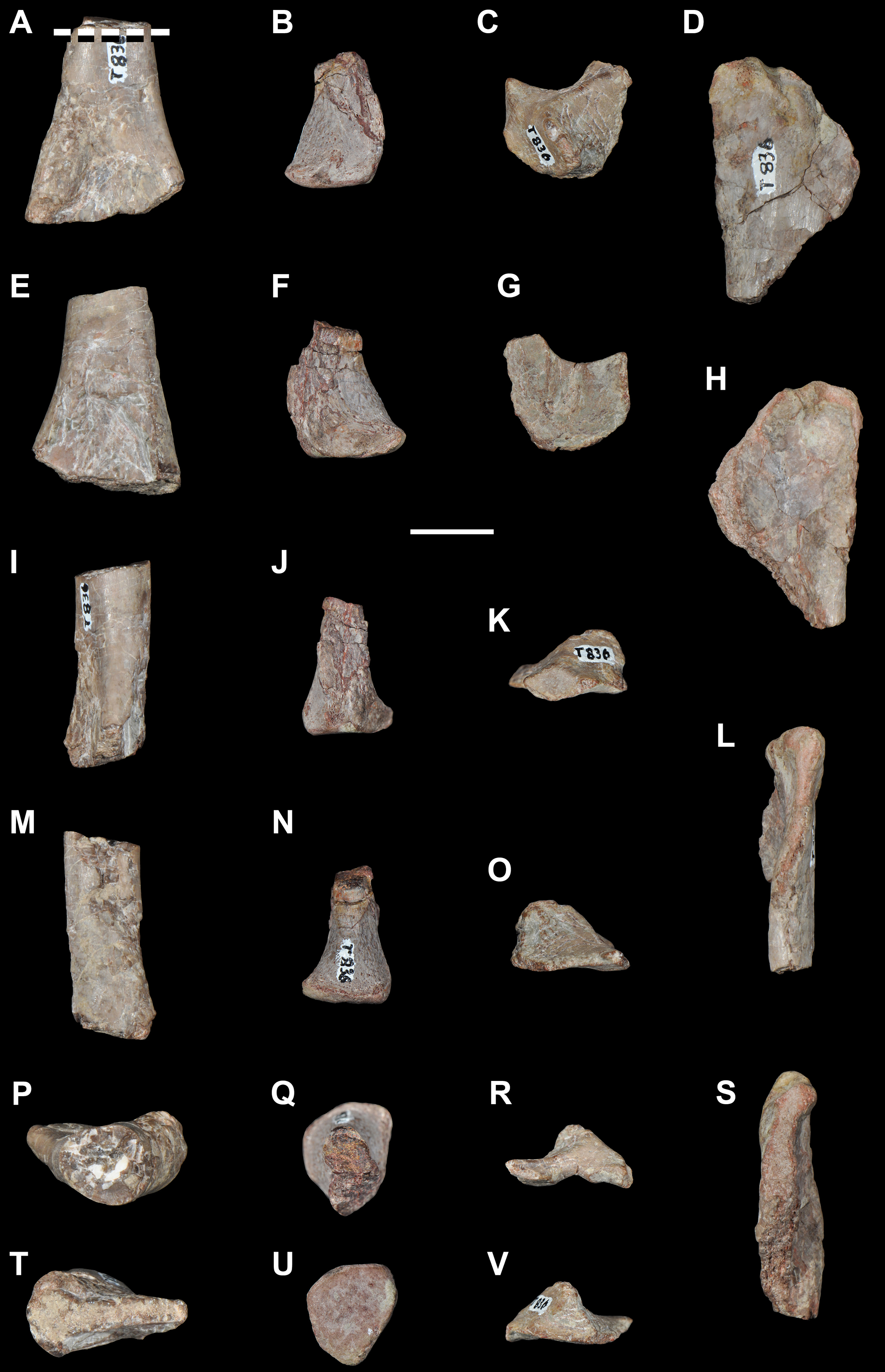
Various bones

The phylogenetic position of Aenigmastropheus was explored by Ezcurra et al. (2014) using a newly constructed data matrix. It is mostly based on the data matrix published by Reisz et al. (2009) with the re-description of Apsisaurus witteri. Thirteen early saurian species, as well as Aenigmastropheus, and 107 characters from Dilkes (1998), Müller (2004) and Senter (2004), as well as some new characters were added to the matrix, and some taxa were scored differently. The resultant data matrix includes 40 amniote taxa, scored based on 219 morphological traits. The cladogram recovered by Ezcurra et al. (2014) was almost entirely consistent with that of Reisz et al. (2009). Aenigmastropheus was recovered as a non-archosauriform archosauromorph, the sister taxon of Protorosaurus speneri from the Wuchiapingian of Germany. Its position within Archosauromorpha was supported by three unambiguous synapomorphies, with two possible synapomorphies supporting the position within Protorosauria. However, due to the fragmentary nature of the holotype of Aenigmastropheus which can be scored for less than 10% of the characters, under constrained topologies only one additional step is required to position Aenigmastropheus outside Archosauromorpha. A more robust version of the same analysis, published in 2016, found it to be one step away from Protorosaurus on the archosauromorph family tree, rather than forming a clade with it. The cladogram below shows the phylogenetic position of Aenigmastropheus among the Sauria following this analysis.

- Sauria
  - †Choristodera
  - Lepidosauromorpha
  - Archosauromorpha
    - - †Aenigmastropheus
      - - †Protorosaurus
        - - †Tanystropheidae
          - Crocopoda
            - †Allokotosauria
              - †Pamelaria
              - - †Azendohsaurus
                - †Trilophosaurus
            - - †Rhynchosauria
              - - †Boreopricea
                - - †Prolacertidae
                  - - †Tasmaniosaurus
                    - Archosauriformes
