= Mobaceras =

Mobaceras Temporal range: Guadalupian

Scientific classification
- Domain: Eukaryota
- Kingdom: Animalia
- Phylum: Chordata
- Clade: Synapsida
- Clade: Therapsida
- Suborder: †Biarmosuchia
- Family: †Burnetiidae
- Genus: †Mobaceras; Kammerer & Sidor, 2021
- Species: †M. zambeziense

Binomial name
- †Mobaceras zambeziense Kammerer & Sidor, 2021

Extinct genus of therapsids

Mobaceras is an extinct genus of biarmosuchian therapsids in the family Burnetiidae from the Guadalupian of Zambia. The type species is M. zambeziense.
