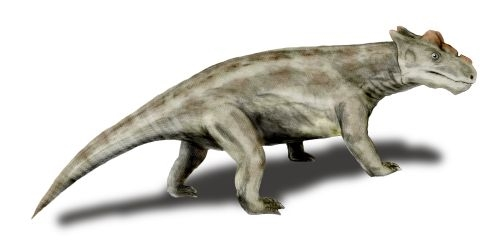
- Life restoration of Proburnetia viatkensis, a burnetiid from the Late Permian of Russia

Scientific classification
- Domain: Eukaryota
- Kingdom: Animalia
- Phylum: Chordata
- Clade: Synapsida
- Clade: Therapsida
- Suborder: †Biarmosuchia
- Clade: †Burnetiamorpha
- Family: †Burnetiidae; Broom, 1923

Subgroups
- †Bondoceras; †Bullacephalus; †Burnetia; †Leucocephalus; †Mobaceras; †Nierkoppia; †Niuksenitia; †Pachydectes; †Paraburnetia; †Proburnetia

= Burnetiidae =

Burnetiidae Temporal range: Middle - Late Permian

Extinct family of therapsids

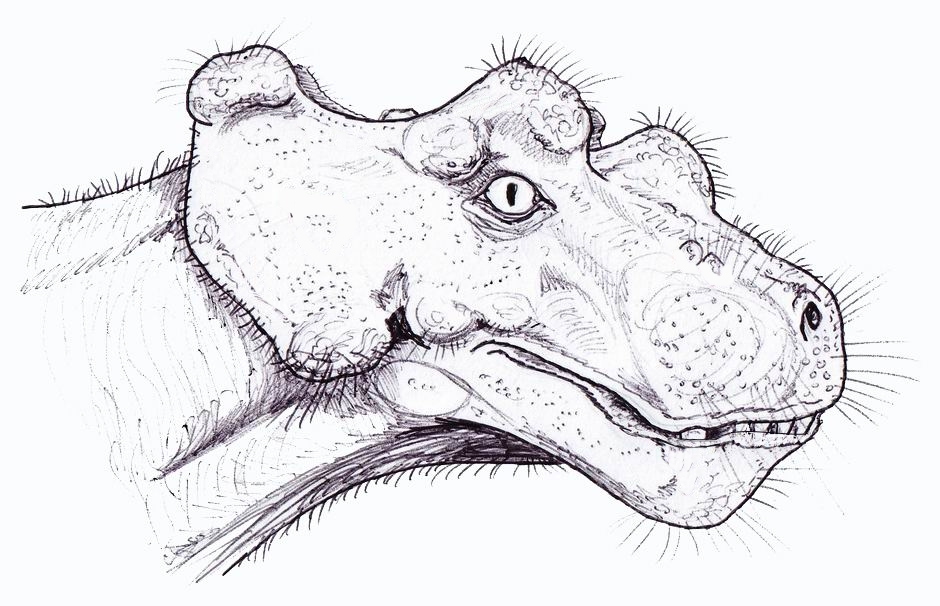
Burnetia mirabilis head

Burnetiidae is an extinct family of biarmosuchian therapsids that lived in the Permian period whose fossils are found in South Africa, Zambia and Russia. It contains Bondoceras, Bullacephalus, Burnetia, Mobaceras, Niuksenitia, Paraburnetia and Proburnetia.
