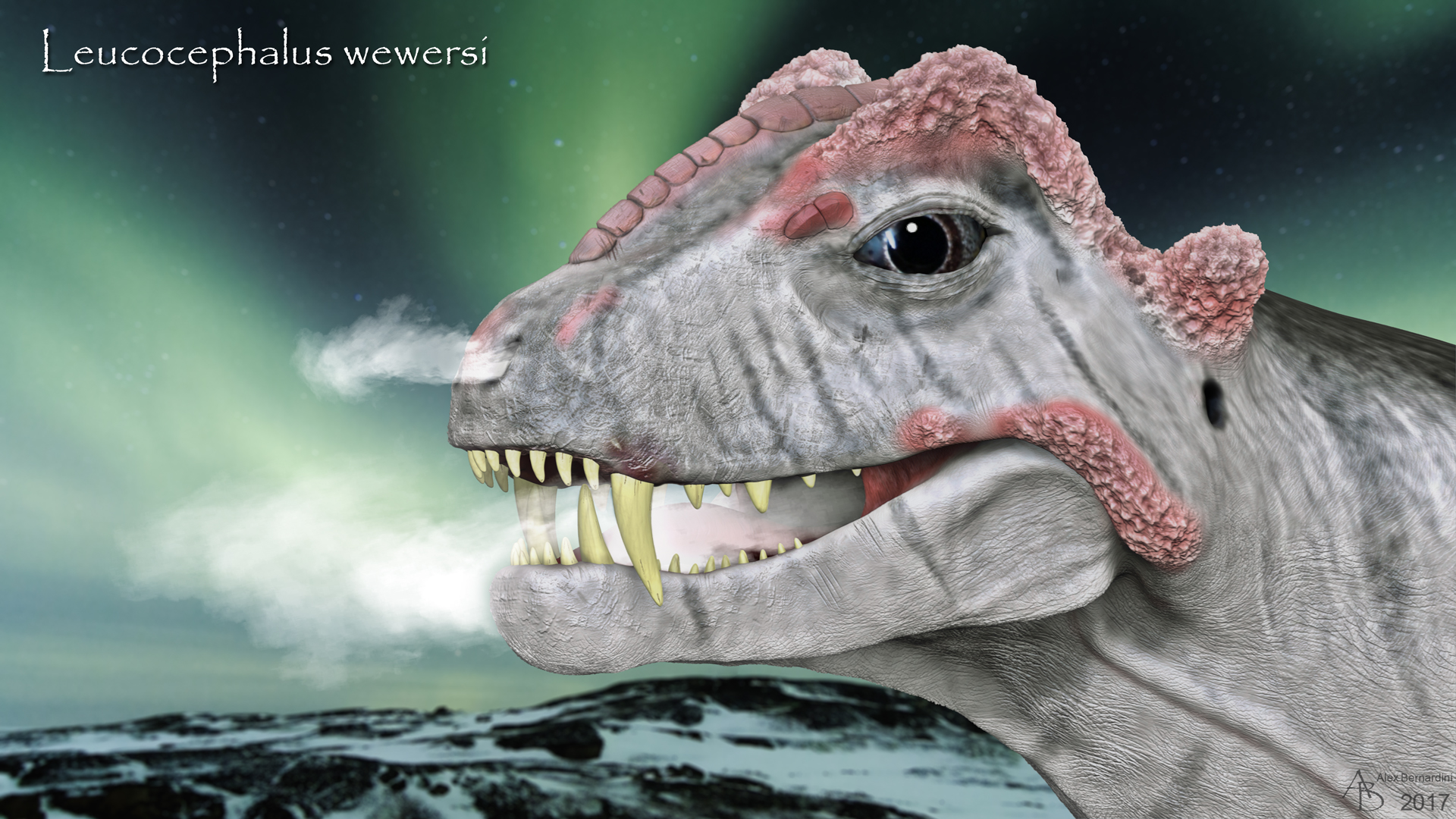

Scientific classification
- Kingdom: Animalia
- Phylum: Chordata
- Clade: Synapsida
- Clade: Therapsida
- Suborder: †Biarmosuchia
- Family: †Burnetiidae
- Genus: †Leucocephalus; Day et al., 2018
- Species: †L. wewersi

Binomial name
- †Leucocephalus wewersi Day et al., 2018

= Leucocephalus =

Leucocephalus Temporal range: Wuchiapingian, 259.1–254.14 Ma

Extinct genus of therapsids

Leucocephalus is a genus of biarmosuchian belonging to the family Burnetiidae dating to the Wuchiapingian (Late Permian). It was found in the Tropidostoma Assemblage Zone of the Main Karoo Basin of South Africa. It is a monotypic taxon which contains one only species, Leucocephalus wewersi. The genus name Leucocephalus is derived from Greek. Leucos, meaning white; kephalos, meaning skull, as the Leucocephalus skull discovered was unusually pale. The species epithet wewersi comes from the farm employee who found the skull, Klaus 'Klaasie' Wewers.

Biarmosuchians are a group of some of the earliest therapsids, a group of synapsids including mammals and their ancestors.

== Discovery ==
The skull of Leucocephalus was found in the Tropidostoma Assemblage Zone (Tropidostoma) of the Main Karoo Basin of South Africa. Only a single skull was found which was located in 2012 at a farm called Amandelboom in Northern Cape Province. It was found on a slope with strata that hosted a tetrapod fossil assemblage to the lower Tropidostoma AZ by a local sheep herder who then hung it on a fence on his farm. Although the skull was outside of its site of burial, strata stuck to it was verified to match that of the adjacent cliff section.

== Paleoenvironment ==
The biostratigraphic occurrence of the skull was in the lowermost Tropidostoma Assemblage Zone. Based on previous dating of the surrounding strata, the Leucocephalus skull is estimated to be around 259 Ma. Other Late Permian therapsids have been collected from the same interval and vicinity including dicynodonts (Pristerodon mackay, Tropidostoma dubium, Diictodon feliceps), a gorgonopsian, and a pareiasaur. Based on discoveries of early therapsids and biarmosuchians, what is now southern Africa may have been the area of origin for burnetiamorphs.

During the period Leucocephalus lived, what is considered the most extensive mass extinction in the history of the earth was occurring, which caused over 80% of the all Earth's species to go extinct. The cause of this end-Permian mass extinction is hypothesized to be climate change induced by volcanic CO_{2} degassing which lead to a cascade of biotic response.

== Description and paleobiology ==
Compared to their pelycosaur ancestors, Leucocephalus and other early therapsids are distinguished by more vertical (mammal like) leg positioning beneath their bodies, larger temporal fenestra and increased jaw complexity and power.

Like other burnetiids, Leucocephalus skulls exhibit numerous distinguished bony protuberances and bosses giving it a bumpy appearance. These include paired supratemporal "horns" formed by the squamosals and parietals. In lateral view, a ridge like boss on the nasal extending exteriorly to the prefrontal is present. The snout is notably tall and the supraorbital region contains large triangular bosses.

Amongst other members of the burnetiid family, Leucocephalus has some distinct features unique to its genus. This includes a longer and rounder than usual vomerine process which is visible in palatal view. The maxilla comprises the majority of the snout and is also larger than usual. Leucocephalus also has a more random arrangement of polygonal raised surfaces and irregular trenches on maxilla than what is observed in other burnetiamorphs. This is hypothesized to be indicators of a thickened dermis or keratinized skin. Leucocephalus exhibits a sinuous intranarial process. Intranarial processes are common in mammal like therapsids, however they are usually straight in biarmosuchians.
