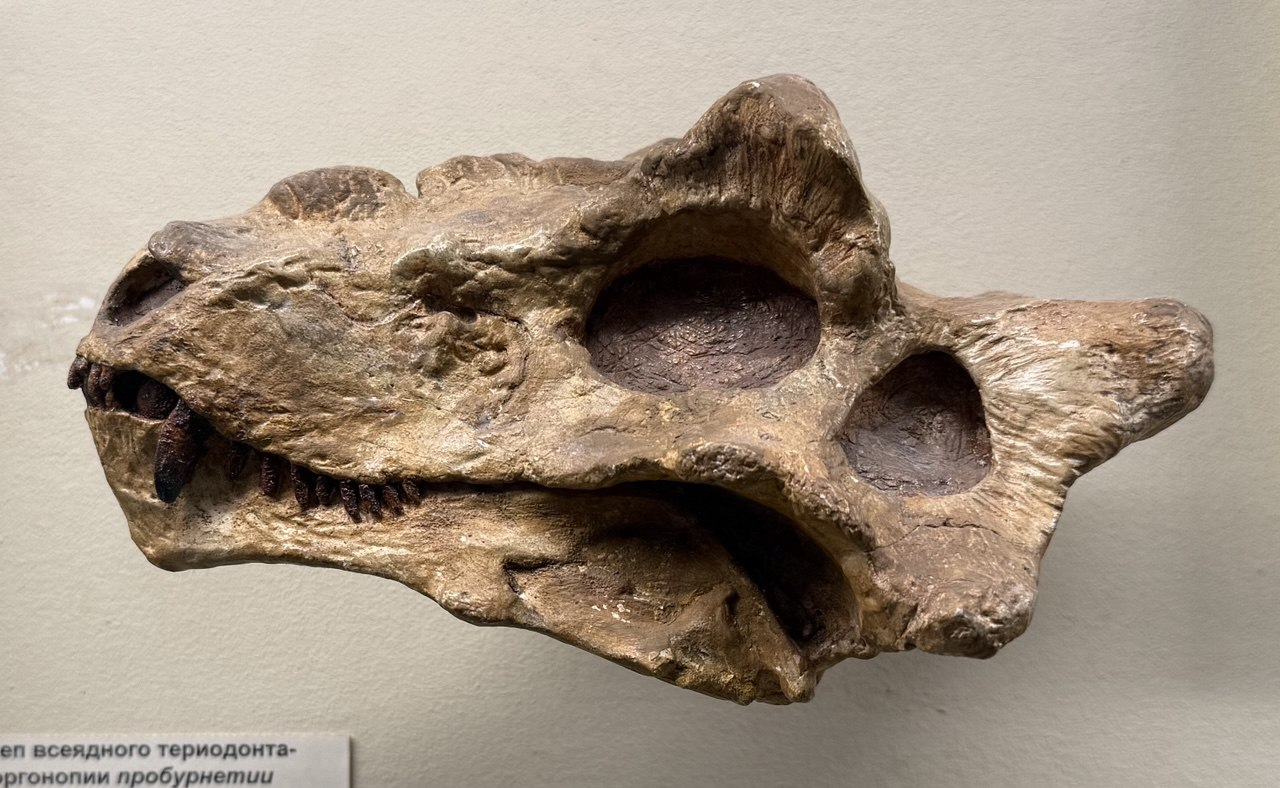
- Skull of Proburnetia viatkensis at the Paleontological Museum of Moscow

Scientific classification
- Kingdom: Animalia
- Phylum: Chordata
- Clade: Synapsida
- Clade: Therapsida
- Suborder: †Biarmosuchia
- Family: †Burnetiidae
- Genus: †Proburnetia; Tatarinov, 1968
- Species: †P. viatkensis

Binomial name
- †Proburnetia viatkensis Tatarinov, 1968

= Proburnetia =

Proburnetia Temporal range: Late Permian

Extinct genus of therapsids

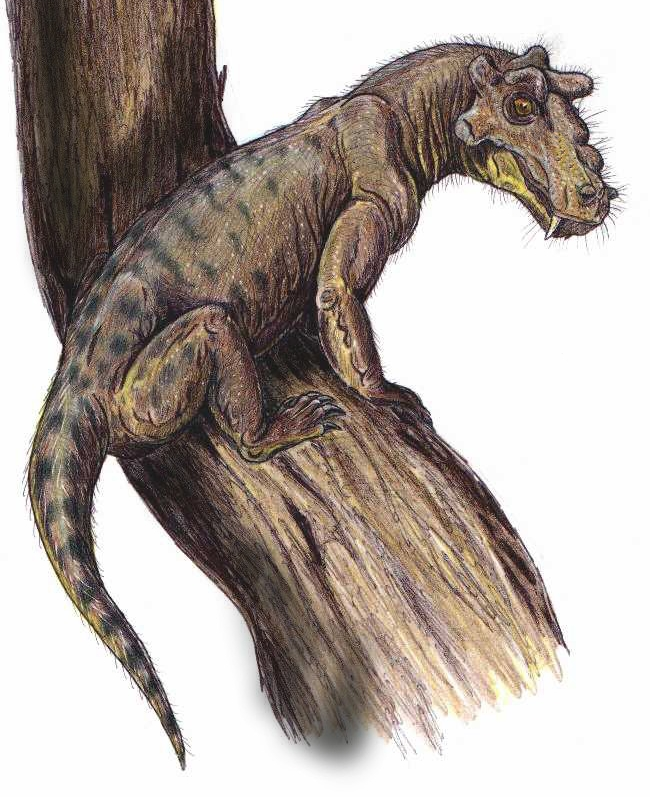
Life restoration

Proburnetia is an extinct genus of biarmosuchian therapsids in the family Burnetiidae, from the Late Permian of Russia. The holotype specimen is preserved as a natural mould. It had bizarre bumps and protrusions on its skull, as is commonly found among burnetiamorph biarmosuchians.
