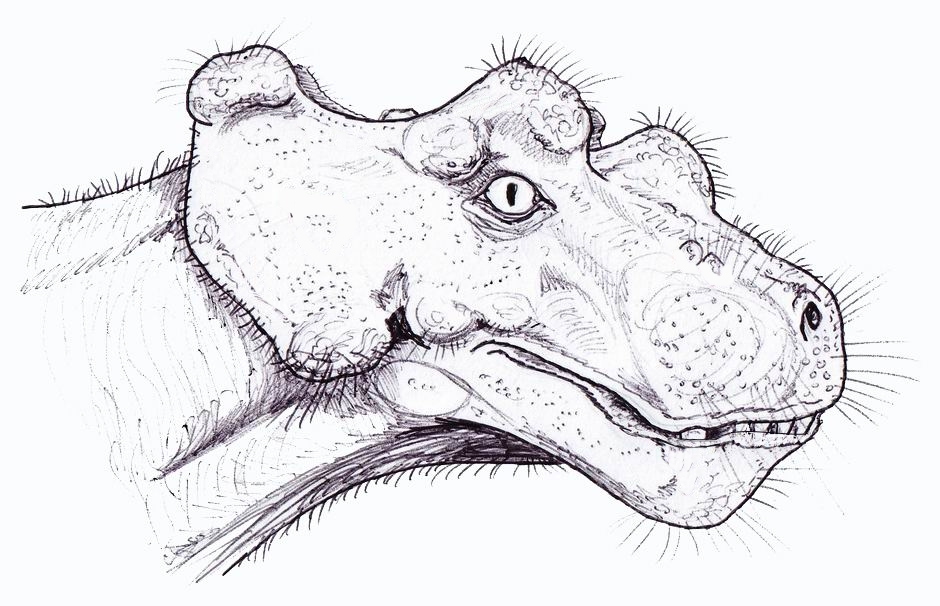
- Life restoration of Burnetia mirabilis

Scientific classification
- Domain: Eukaryota
- Kingdom: Animalia
- Phylum: Chordata
- Clade: Synapsida
- Clade: Therapsida
- Suborder: †Biarmosuchia
- Family: †Burnetiidae
- Genus: †Burnetia; Broom, 1923
- Species: †B. mirabilis

Binomial name
- †Burnetia mirabilis Broom, 1923

= Burnetia =

Burnetia Temporal range: Late Permian

Extinct genus of therapsids

Burnetia is an extinct genus of biarmosuchian therapsids in the family Burnetiidae, from the Late Permian of South Africa. Burnetia is known so far from a single holotype skull lacking the lower jaws described by South African paleontologist Robert Broom in 1923. Due to erosion and dorsoventral crushing, features of the skull are hard to interpret. Stutural lines are further distorted by the unusual shape of the skull roof, including many bosses and protuberances.

== Description ==
When broadly looking at the skull, there are well-developed "cheeks", bosses and pits that resemble Pareiasaurians'. However, the small temporal fossa distinguishes it from the Cotylosaur. The overall shape resembles a triangle. In the nasals, there is a bulging expansion of bone. Unlike proburnetia's median nasal bridge being long, narrow and raised, Burnetia's is splindle-shaped. The median nasal boss is spindle-shaped. The snout is wide and blunt. The large preorbital pits on the lachrymal are significant. Over the orbit there are notable ridges on the prefrontal and frontal. The supra-orbital ridges make the orbits face distally and posteriorly. The suborbital eminence is subdivided into distinguished portions. The small pineal foramen sits dorsally on a boss.

Burnetia's palate is similar to Gorgonopsians'. Anteriorly, the internal nares have the lower canines. The maxilla is adjacent to the palatine, and posterior to the palatine is the long prevomer that meets the premaxilla. The palatine is tooth bearing, as well as the pterygoid that is just posterior to the palatine. The vomer is held by the surrounding vomerine processes that form the choanae's middle border. Unlike the rest of burnetiamorphs, Burnetia's interchoanal part of the vomer is not narrow.

The concave occiput is tilted up, which is shown when it is aligned vertically, the snout faces downward. The supraoccipital sits anterior to the paraoccipital. The size of the basioccipital is considered to be small. The majority of the occipital surface, posterior "horn", and posterior lateral margins are made from the squamosal.

The basisphenoid in Burnetia differs from Gorgonopsians'. In Burnetia, their basisphenoid is round and shallow. In the middle of the basisphenoid, it is separated by a groove. Gorgonopsians' basisphenoid contrasts Burnetia's by having a "single sharp median keel".

== Discovery ==
Broom found Burnetia mirabilis in the Dicynodon Assemblage Zone near Graaff-Reinet, South Africa. Broom concluded that Burnetia was related closest to the group of Gorgonopsians. However, Broom made observations based on the skull when it was covered by matrix and no underlying bone was visible. Lieuwe Boonstra removed this matrix and found that Burnetia and Gorgonopsians differed mainly by the thickening of dermal bones, bosses and their basisphenoids.

== Paleoenvironment ==
Phylogenetic analysis done by Ashley Kruger suggests that a likely origin for burnetiamorphs could be southern Africa. The base and oldest burnetiamorphs are found in South Africa.

== Classification and related taxa ==
The family Burnetiidae came from the discovery of Burnetia, but new discoveries led to the studies of burnetiamorphs. Burnetiamorphs only have about two taxa that represent each genus. It was previously believed that the Burnetiidae clade only contained two taxa, Burnetia mirabilis and Proburnetia viatkensis, but later Pachydectes and Bullacephalus were found to be included in the clade, as well. It was unable to be confirmed if Pachydectes shared the feature of nasal the nasal supporting a middle boss like Burnetia. However, like Burnetia, above the postorbital bar they have a significant boss. Lycaenodon longiceps is in the clade Biarmosuchia and has some similarities to Burnetia. Both Lycaenodon and Burnetia likely had a large foramen, surrounded by the vomer and vomerine process. This foramen implies that in biarmosuchians, the vomeronasal organ may have communicated with the oral cavity. They also share the trait of having a long vomerine process. The first burnetiid therapsid found in Tanzania's Usili Formation was found to most resemble Burnetia. The Usili burnetiid and Burnetia both had bosses above their orbits that were "S"-like.
