= Niuksenitia =

Niuksenitia Temporal range: Late Permian

Scientific classification
- Domain: Eukaryota
- Kingdom: Animalia
- Phylum: Chordata
- Clade: Synapsida
- Clade: Therapsida
- Suborder: †Biarmosuchia
- Family: †Burnetiidae
- Genus: †Niuksenitia; Tatarinov, 1977
- Species: †N. sukhonensis

Binomial name
- †Niuksenitia sukhonensis Tatarinov, 1977

Extinct genus of therapsids

Niuksenitia is an extinct genus of biarmosuchian therapsids from the Late Permian of Russia. It is only known from a partial skull including part of the posterior half of the skull and the palate. Because so little of it is known, it is difficult to determine the closest relatives of this species.
