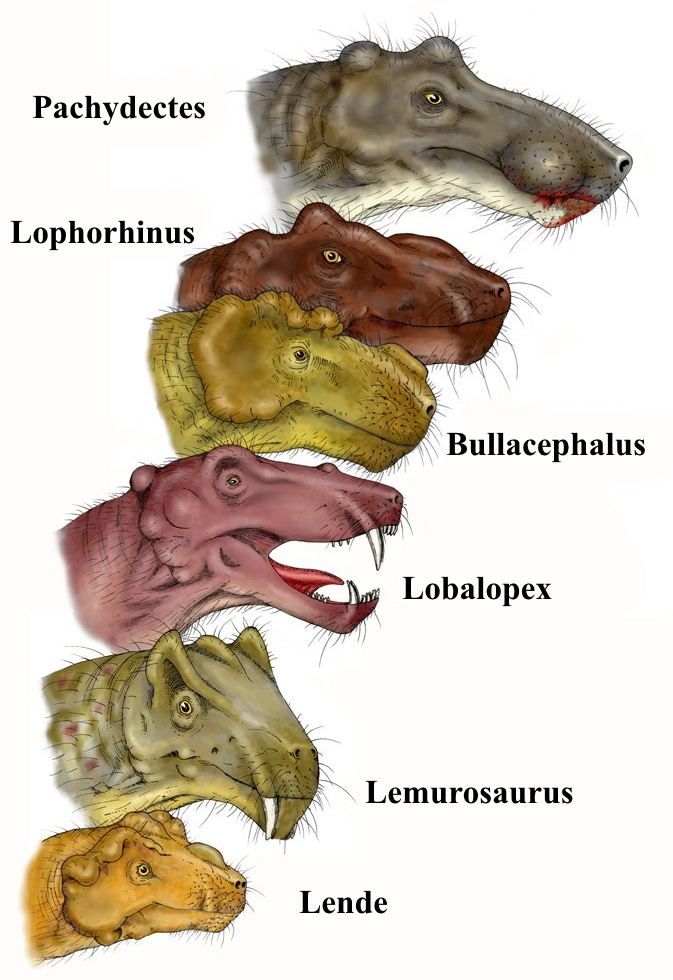

Scientific classification
- Kingdom: Animalia
- Phylum: Chordata
- Clade: Synapsida
- Clade: Therapsida
- Suborder: †Biarmosuchia
- Family: †Burnetiidae
- Genus: †Bullacephalus; Rubidge and Kitching, 2003
- Species: †B. jacksoni

Binomial name
- †Bullacephalus jacksoni Rubidge and Kitching, 2003

= Bullacephalus =

Bullacephalus Temporal range: Late Permian

Extinct genus of animal

Bullacephalus is an extinct genus of biarmosuchian therapsids belonging to the family Burnetiidae. The type species B. jacksoni was named in 2003. It is known from a relatively complete skull and lower jaw, discovered in the Late Permian Tapinocephalus Assemblage Zone of the Beaufort Group of South Africa. This genus of therapsida lived during the Late Permian period, approximately 250 million years ago.

The name Bullacephalus comes from the Latin words "bullatus," meaning "bossed" or "knobbed," and "cephalus," meaning "head." This name refers to the distinctive bony knob on the top of the therapsid's skull, which contributes to the history of this genus. This stem based taxon includes Ictidorhinus or Hippasaurs. Bullacephalus can even be characterized as having "skull moderately to greatly pachyostotic; swollen boss present above the postorbital bar formed by the postfrontal and postorbital; deep linear sculpturing of the snout; exclusion of the jugal from the lateral temporal fenestra". Further research into the morphology, phylogenetics, and ecology of Bullacephalus and other Burnetiamorpha will likely continue to yield insights into the evolution of therapsids and the complex history of life on Earth.

== Taxonomy ==
Despite the limited amount of fossil material available, Bullacephalus has generated considerable interest among paleontologists due to its unique morphology and uncertain taxonomic classification. It is a part of the Burnetiamorpha suborder. Currently, the Burnetiamorpha comprise nine genera: Bullacephalus, Burnetia, Lemurosaurus, Lobalopex, Lophorhinus, Paraburnetia, and Pachydectes from South Africa. (Kruger et al., 2015). Some researchers have suggested that Bullacephalus are a type of Therapsida: Biarmoschia, related to the successful tetrapod Anomadontia helping researchers understand the basic morphology. This specific therapsid could be distinguished by the short snout, septomaxilla, and has a short facial exposure between nasal and maxilla, along with many other skull characteristics. Its unique morphology, particularly its short snout and septomaxilla, have led researchers to speculate about its feeding habits and ecological niche.
