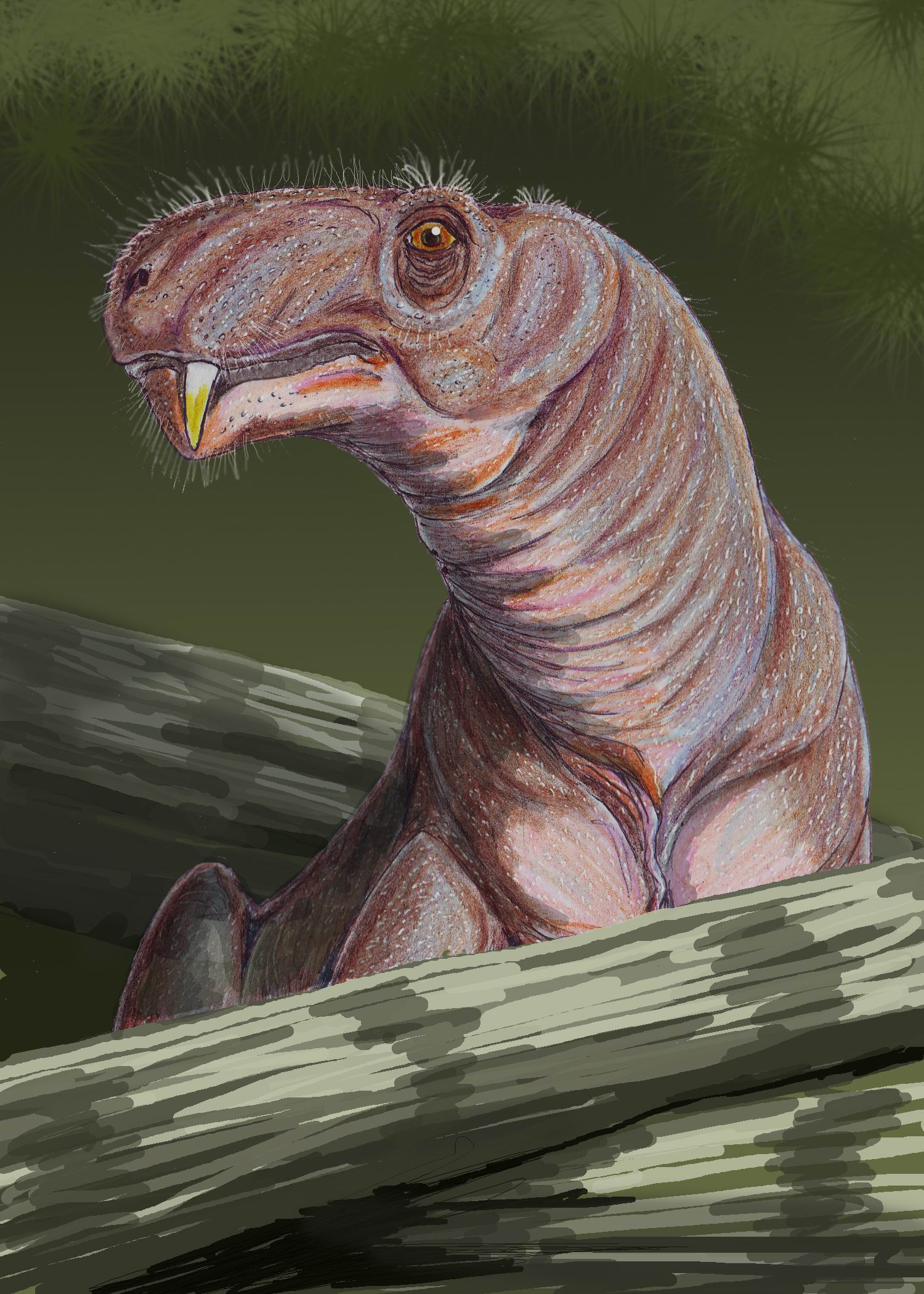
- Life restoration of Kamagorgon ulanovi

Scientific classification
- Domain: Eukaryota
- Kingdom: Animalia
- Phylum: Chordata
- Clade: Synapsida
- Clade: Therapsida
- Clade: †Gorgonopsia (?)
- Genus: †Kamagorgon; Tatarinov, 1998
- Species: †K. ulanovi

Binomial name
- †Kamagorgon ulanovi Tatarinov, 1998

= Kamagorgon =

Kamagorgon Temporal range: Permian, 270–269 Ma

Extinct genus of therapsids

Kamagorgon is an extinct genus of therapsids from the Middle Permian of Russia. The type and only species is Kamagorgon ulanovi. It is only known from an incomplete skull. The snout is short and the canine teeth are very large. Kamagorgon was named in 1998 and originally classified in the biarmosuchian family Eotitanosuchidae along with the poorly known therapsid Eotitanosuchus. More recently, Kamagorgon has considered as a primitive gorgonopsian rather than a biarmosuchian due to the length of the front jawbone and rear side of the skull. These features are commonly shared by the brithopodid and biarmosuchid lineages.
