= Hipposauroides =

Hipposauroides Temporal range: Late Permian

Scientific classification
- Domain: Eukaryota
- Kingdom: Animalia
- Phylum: Chordata
- Clade: Synapsida
- Clade: Therapsida
- Suborder: †Biarmosuchia
- Family: †Hipposauridae (?)
- Genus: †Hipposauroides; Boonstra, 1952
- Species: †H. rubidgei

Binomial name
- †Hipposauroides rubidgei Boonstra, 1952

Extinct genus of therapsids

Hipposauroides is an extinct genus of biarmosuchian therapsids from the Late Permian of South Africa.
