= Ustia (therapsid) =

Ustia Temporal range: Middle Permian

Scientific classification
- Kingdom: Animalia
- Phylum: Chordata
- Clade: Synapsida
- Clade: Therapsida
- Suborder: †Biarmosuchia
- Genus: †Ustia; Ivachnenko, 2003

Type species
- †Ustia atra Ivachnenko, 2003

Extinct genus of therapsids

Ustia is an extinct genus of biarmosuchian therapsids from the Middle Permian of Russia. It is known from a single species, Ustia atra, which was described in 2003 from an isolated lower jaw. Ustia was classified in the family Ictidorhinidae, which also includes the genus Ictidorhinus from South Africa. Both are relatively small biarmosuchians. Several other Russian therapsids known only from lower jaw bones have been placed in Ictidorhinidae, and the family is likely a paraphyletic assemblage representing a small body type than a true clade.

They are also small mammals. They were at first misclassified as gorgonopsians. Their bones are very important in classifying other bones from other biarmosuchians therapsids.
