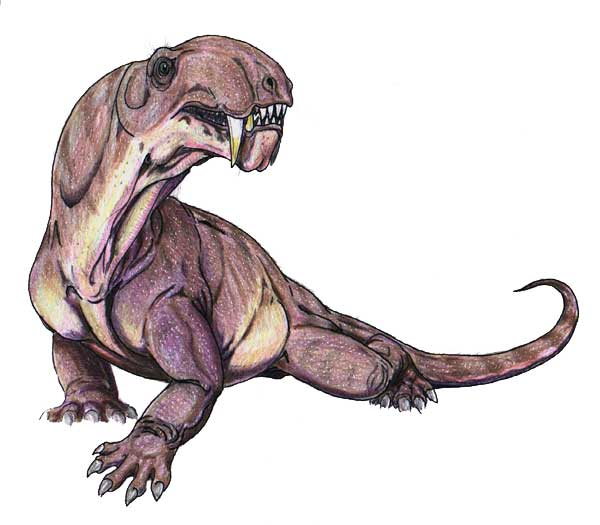
- Life restoration

Scientific classification
- Domain: Eukaryota
- Kingdom: Animalia
- Phylum: Chordata
- Clade: Synapsida
- Clade: Therapsida
- Suborder: †Biarmosuchia
- Family: †Eotitanosuchidae
- Genus: †Ivantosaurus; Tchudinov, 1983

Type species
- †Ivantosaurus ensifer Tchudinov, 1983

= Ivantosaurus =

Ivantosaurus Temporal range: Wordian, 267 Ma

Extinct genus of therapsid reptile

Ivantosaurus is an extinct genus of therapsid that lived in Russia during the Wordian stage of the Permian period, named in honor of paleontologist Ivan Antonovich Efremov.

== Description ==
Ivantosaurus is based on a very fragmentary skull, consisting of 2 partial maxillae and a quadrate. The specimen was discovered in the Perm Region of the Ochersky District, Russia. Fossils from the region date to the Upper Kazanian Substage of the Upper Permian, making it one of the latest Therapsids known. It was carnivorous and may have grown to a length of 6 m (20 ft). Ivantosaurus would have been the largest carnivorous therapsid known, exceeding in size even the largest Late Wordian/early Capitanian anteosaurs.

=== Teeth ===
Two canine teeth are set side-to-side in Ivantosaurus' jaw and with their axes inclined forward. It is possible that this therapsid had a unique dentition (no other known animal has two sets of canine teeth), but more likely that a replacement tooth was growing in next to the old tooth about to be lost. Sigogneau-Russell (1989) seems to think this is unlikely, which would make this a quite different animal from Eotitanosuchus. As with the therocephalian family Lycosuchidae, these may simply be replacement canines. There are few known animals, living or extinct, with two sets of canines (it would be a very inefficient chewing mechanism).

== See also ==
- List of therapsids

== Sources ==
- The Age of Dinosaurs in Russia and Mongolia. Benton, Michael J.; Shishkin, Mikhail A.; Unwin, David M. 2003. pp. 91–92.
