= Pseudohipposaurus =

Pseudohipposaurus Temporal range: Late Permian

Scientific classification
- Kingdom: Animalia
- Phylum: Chordata
- Clade: Synapsida
- Clade: Therapsida
- Suborder: †Biarmosuchia
- Family: †Hipposauridae (?)
- Genus: †Pseudohipposaurus; Boonstra, 1952
- Species: †P. kitchingi

Binomial name
- †Pseudohipposaurus kitchingi Boonstra, 1952

Extinct genus of therapsids

Pseudohipposaurus is an extinct genus of biarmosuchian therapsids from the Late Permian of South Africa.

== See also ==
- List of therapsids
