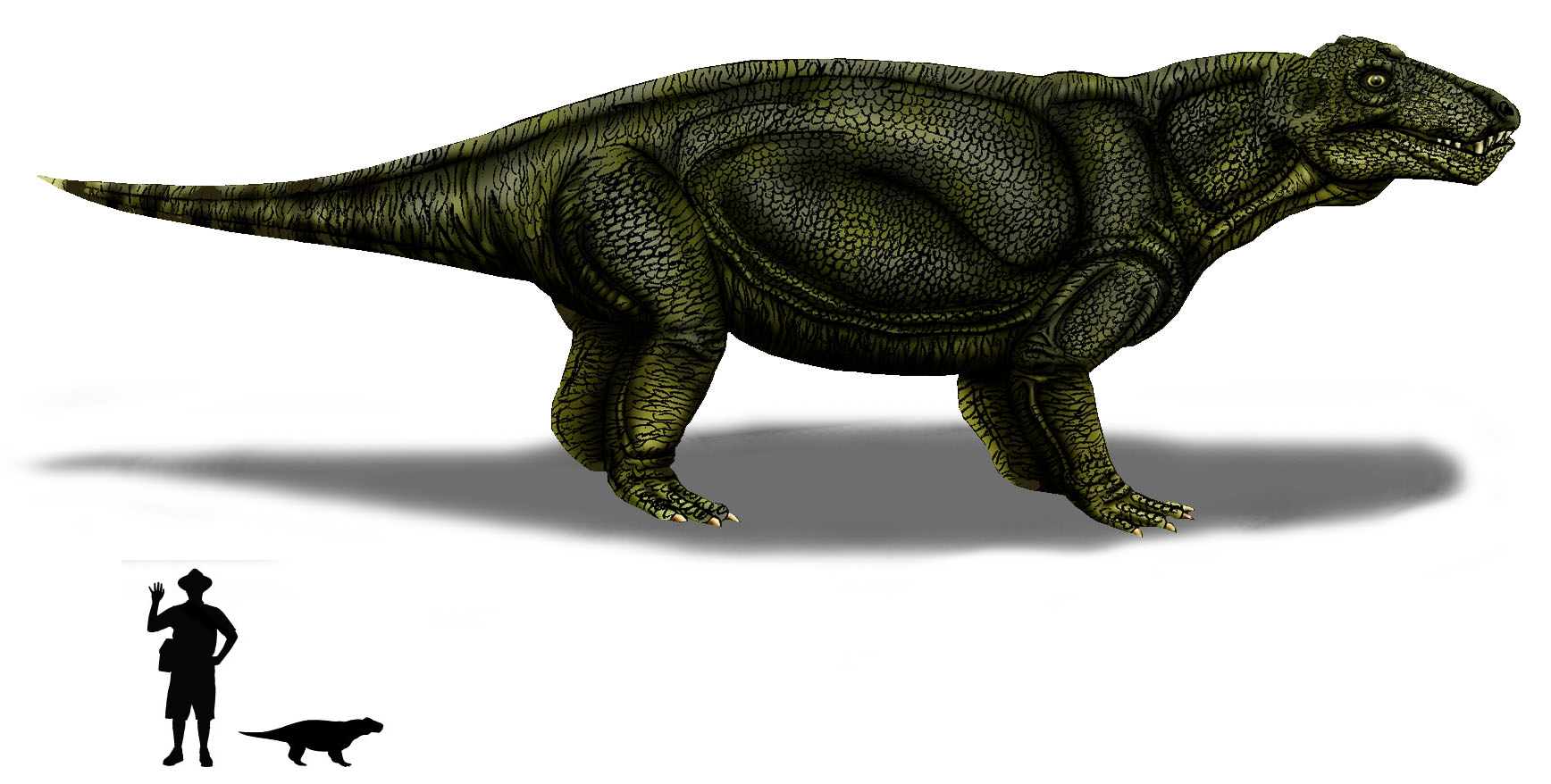
- Life restoration of Hipposaurus boonstrai

Scientific classification
- Kingdom: Animalia
- Phylum: Chordata
- Clade: Synapsida
- Clade: Therapsida
- Suborder: †Biarmosuchia
- Family: †Hipposauridae; Romer, 1956

Genera
- †Hipposauroides?; †Hipposaurus; †Pseudohipposaurus?

= Hipposauridae =

Hipposauridae Temporal range: Late Permian

Extinct family of therapsids

Hipposauridae is an extinct family of biarmosuchian therapsids from the Late Permian of South Africa. It includes the genus Hipposaurus, and possibly the genera Hipposauroides and Pseudohipposaurus. A closely related biarmosuchian is Ictidorhinus, which has been placed in the family Ictidorhinidae.
