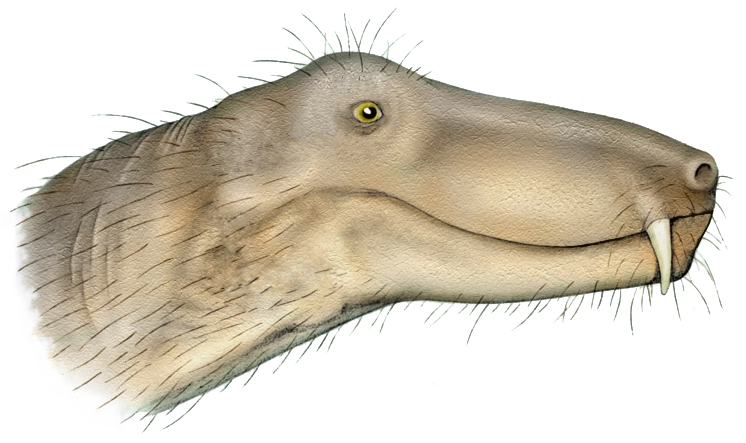
- Herpetoskylax hopsoni

Scientific classification
- Kingdom: Animalia
- Phylum: Chordata
- Clade: Synapsida
- Clade: Therapsida
- Suborder: †Biarmosuchia
- Genus: †Herpetoskylax; Sidor and Rubidge, 2006
- Species: †H. hopsoni

Binomial name
- †Herpetoskylax hopsoni Sidor and Rubidge, 2006

= Herpetoskylax =

Herpetoskylax Temporal range: Late Permian 259–254 Ma

Extinct genus of therapsids

Herpetoskylax is an extinct genus of biarmosuchian therapsids which existed in South Africa. The type species is Herpetoskylax hopsoni. It lived in the Late Permian Period.

The genus name means 'reptile-puppy', from the Ancient Greek herpeto- (ἑρπετόν, 'creeping animal') and skylax (σκύλαξ, 'young dog'). The juxtaposition of reptilian and mammalian names highlights the transitional characters of non-mammalian therapsids. The type specimen is CGP 1/67, a skull. The skull and lower jaw were the only components found.

== Description ==
=== Skull ===
The skull of Herpetoskylax is noted to have been preserved unusually well in regards to other biarmosuchians. It is approximately 13 centimeters long. Skull sutures can be recognized and the skull itself is only compressed slightly. It displays primitive features such as a convex curve to the skull roof when viewed from the side, a "deep snout," a small temporal opening, and the absence of a freestanding coronoid process on the lower jaw. It has large eyes, a trait shared with other biarmosuchians. It is inferred that the premaxilla was short, similar to its fellow biarmosuchian, Lycaenodon.

Four premaxillary teeth are present with few serrations (likely from attrition), but it is suggested there was an additional tooth based on a gap noted in the region. The genus has no precanine maxillary teeth, but it does have significant canines. Serrations are present on the posterior side of said canines, as well as on the postcanine teeth.

The skull differs from other biarmosuchians in the configuration of the septomaxilla, of which both sides were preserved. The septomaxilla, a small bone associated with the nose area, goes in between the maxilla and the external naris (nose). The maxilla is a smooth, sizable bone. The relation between the premaxilla and maxilla is unknown due to insufficient preservation. The postfrontal bone, dorsal to the eyes, is flat, particularly in contrast with this specimen's relatives, which often have display structures in this region. Sidor and Rubidge comment that the morphology of Herpetoskylax's jugal (cheek bone) is easiest to see compared to other biarmosuchians.

Across non-mammal therapsids, of which Herpetoskylax is part of, in terms of the braincase, the inside shape of the skull is generally primitive. They have no enlargement of their cerebral hemisphere or their cerebellum, no divide between cerebral hemispheres, and they may have had small olfactory bulbs. However, biarmosuchians have more derived features as well, such as a strong flexure at the level of the midbrain.

==== Palate ====
Herpetoskylax lacks palatal dentition, which is a feature seen in many tetrapods. It has been theorized that the loss of palatal teeth in more derived tetrapods was perhaps due to changes in feeding or the expansion of the secondary palate, but it cannot be confirmed.

There is compression in the palate so its finer details are unknown, such as whether the vomer is connected to the palatine or pterygoid.

==== Lower Jaw ====
In the holotype, the left side of the back lower jaw is missing, but the right side was preserved well. The lower jaw is fairly narrow. Anteriorly, the jaw is shallow, but posteriorly it deepens, which is characteristic of biarmosuchians.

== Discovery and Name ==
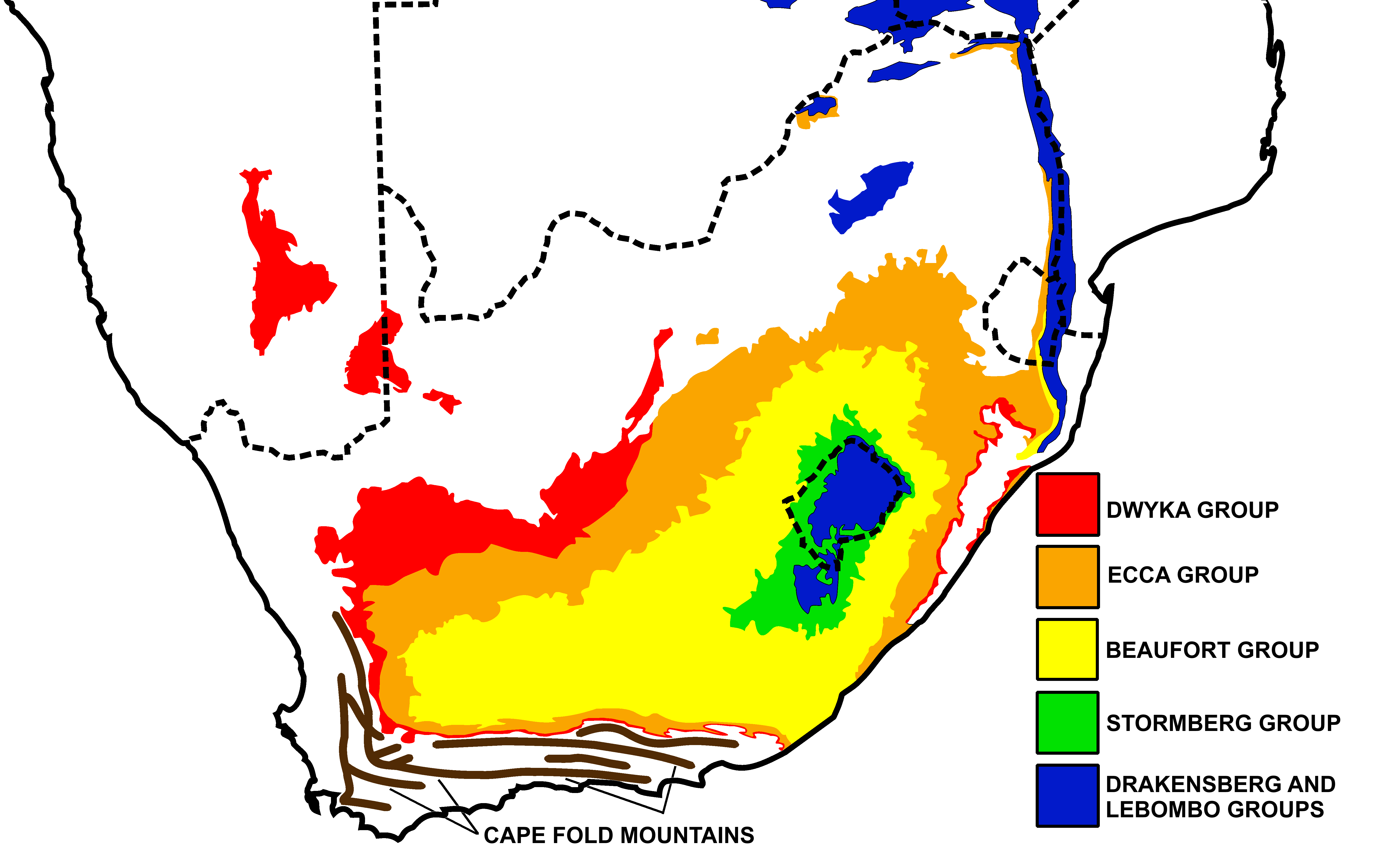
The region (in yellow) where Herpetoskylax was found

The holotype skull was found in the Beaufort Group in the Karoo Basin of South Africa, located in the Beaufort West District, Western Cape Province. It was found on a farm, and it was determined that the skull was from the Cistecephalus Assemblage Zone, which was used as evidence for the conclusion that its age was Late Permian. The species was described and named by Christian A. Sidor and Bruce S. Rubidge in 2006.

The species name hopsoni honors Dr. James A. Hopson who did extensive and relevant research on biarmosuchians.

== Classification ==
The group Biarmosuchia, including Herpetoskylax

- Biarmosuchia
  - Biarmosuchus
  - - Hipposaurus
    - - Herpetoskylax
      - - Lycaenodon
        - - Ictidorhinus
          - - Lobalopex
            - Lemurosaurus

Based on Sidor and Rubidge, 2006

Herpetoskylax belongs to the basal non-mammal therapsid group Biarmosuchia, with suggested sister taxa Hipposaurus and Lycaenodon based on Sidor and Rubidge's phylogenetic trees. More broadly, it is a synapsid.

Rubidgina has been proposed as a possible juvenile Herpetosklyax hopsoni, but a study in 2021 by Duhamel et al. advised that this is uncertain.

== Paleobiology ==
Biarmosuchians, including Herpetoskylax, had skulls specialized for a carnivorous diet, with their large canines and enlarged jaw muscles. Herpetoskylax was estimated to have a hearing range of 8248.16 hertz and a mean frequency of 4691.32 hertz based on an analysis of the skull.

There are various theories relating to snout sensitivity in non-mammal therapsids; members of the group may have had whiskers, given that they share maxillary features with mammals like specific snout foramen. Similar features are present in reptiles, so it is not a certainty, though it is likely given their relation to mammals.

Paleontologist Robert Bakker theorized that therapsids were endothermic (i.e., warm-blooded), citing evidence that the Permian climate was often cold and therapsids would have needed the advantage to be so prolific during this time. In 1986, a paper by Bennett and Ruben asserted that the Permian was sufficiently warm to support ectothermy (cold-bloodedness), additionally noting that other successful fauna of the time were ectothermic. They concluded, however, that it was possible for therapsids to have been endothermic based on features shared with mammalian groups such as monotremes and therians. Herpetoskylax did not possess nasal turbinals, a trait associated with endothermy in extant mammals and birds, as this character has only been confirmed in more derived therapsids.

== Paleoenvironment ==
Herpetoskylax lived in what is now the Beaufort Group in South Africa, a region in the Karoo Basin. This area in the late Permian is thought to have been seasonal and varied from wet to dry climates. Vegetation along streams and lakes were theorized to provide a diet for reptilians and acted as a foundation for carnivorous non-mammal therapsids like Herpetoskylax.
