= Biarmosuchoides =

Biarmosuchoides Temporal range: 268–265 Ma

Scientific classification
- Domain: Eukaryota
- Kingdom: Animalia
- Phylum: Chordata
- Clade: Synapsida
- Clade: Therapsida
- Suborder: †Biarmosuchia
- Family: †Biarmosuchidae
- Genus: †Biarmosuchoides; Tverdokhlebova and Ivakhnenko, 1994
- Species: †B. romanovi

Binomial name
- †Biarmosuchoides romanovi Tverdokhlebova and Ivakhnenko, 1994

Extinct genus of therapsids

Biarmosuchoides is a genus of a therapsid found in Dubovka I in Orenburg Oblast (Russia). It is known only from SGU 104B/2051, a left dentary. It was originally classified as a biarmosuchian, but Suchkova, Golubev & Shumov (2022) subsequently reinterpreted it as a therocephalian belonging to the family Scylacosauridae.
