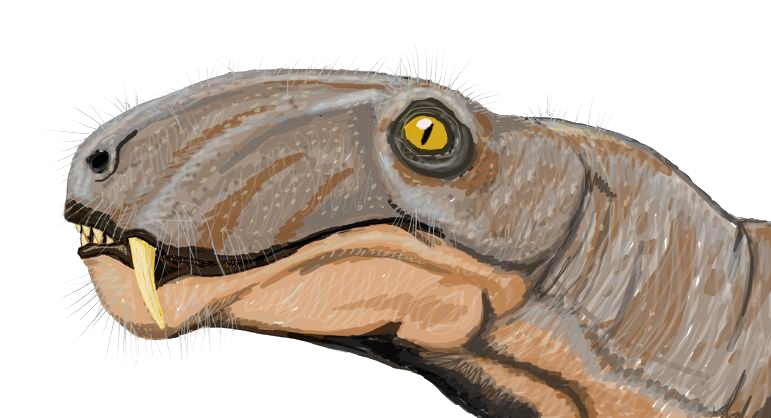
- Life restoration of the eotitanosuchid Eotitanosuchus olsoni

Scientific classification
- Kingdom: Animalia
- Phylum: Chordata
- Clade: Synapsida
- Clade: Therapsida
- Suborder: †Biarmosuchia
- Infraorder: †Eotitanosuchia; Boonstra, 1963
- Family: †Eotitanosuchidae; Tchudinov, 1960

Type species
- †Eotitanosuchus olsoni Tchudinov, 1960

Genera
- †Eotitanosuchus; †Ivantosaurus; †Kamagorgon?

= Eotitanosuchidae =

Eotitanosuchidae Temporal range: Wordian, 267 Ma

Extinct family of therapsids

Eotitanosuchidae is an extinct family of biarmosuchian therapsids. The Eotitanosuchidae were large predatory therapsids of the Wordian epoch. It was once considered to belong to a separate infraorder of therapsids called Eotitanosuchia.

== Characteristics ==
The Eotitanosuchians seem to be more advanced than the Biarmosuchia in that the temporal opening behind the eye socket—although small—is still somewhat larger than the biarmosuchians; it is expanded in the upper rear (posterodorsal) margin, allowing the area of attachment of the adductor (jaw closing) muscles to be visible from the dorsal (top) view looking down. The eotitanosuchian bite was stronger and more efficient than the biarmosuchian bite. For this reason, some paleontologists see the eotitanosuchids as transitional between the biarmosuchians and higher therapsids. It is at least as likely that features of a larger temporal opening—and hence increased muscle mass and biting power—evolved simultaneously among a number of early therapsid groups, due to the obvious advantages this adaptation conferred. One must be wary in applying cladistic methodology to characteristics that are likely to evolve simultaneously among many competing lineages. In other respects the eotitanosuchians are quite primitive; they were the least modified in their jaw apparatus from their sphenacodont ancestry.
