= Wantulignathus =

Wantulignathus Temporal range: 272.5–259 Ma

Scientific classification
- Kingdom: Animalia
- Phylum: Chordata
- Clade: Synapsida
- Clade: Therapsida
- Suborder: †Biarmosuchia
- Genus: †Wantulignathus; Whitney and Sidor, 2016
- Species: †W. gwembensis

Binomial name
- †Wantulignathus gwembensis Whitney and Sidor, 2016

Extinct genus of mammal ancestors

Wantulignathus is genus of biarmosuchian therapsid from the Madumabisa Mudstone Formation, Zambia. It is known from fragmentary lower jaws and ribs.
