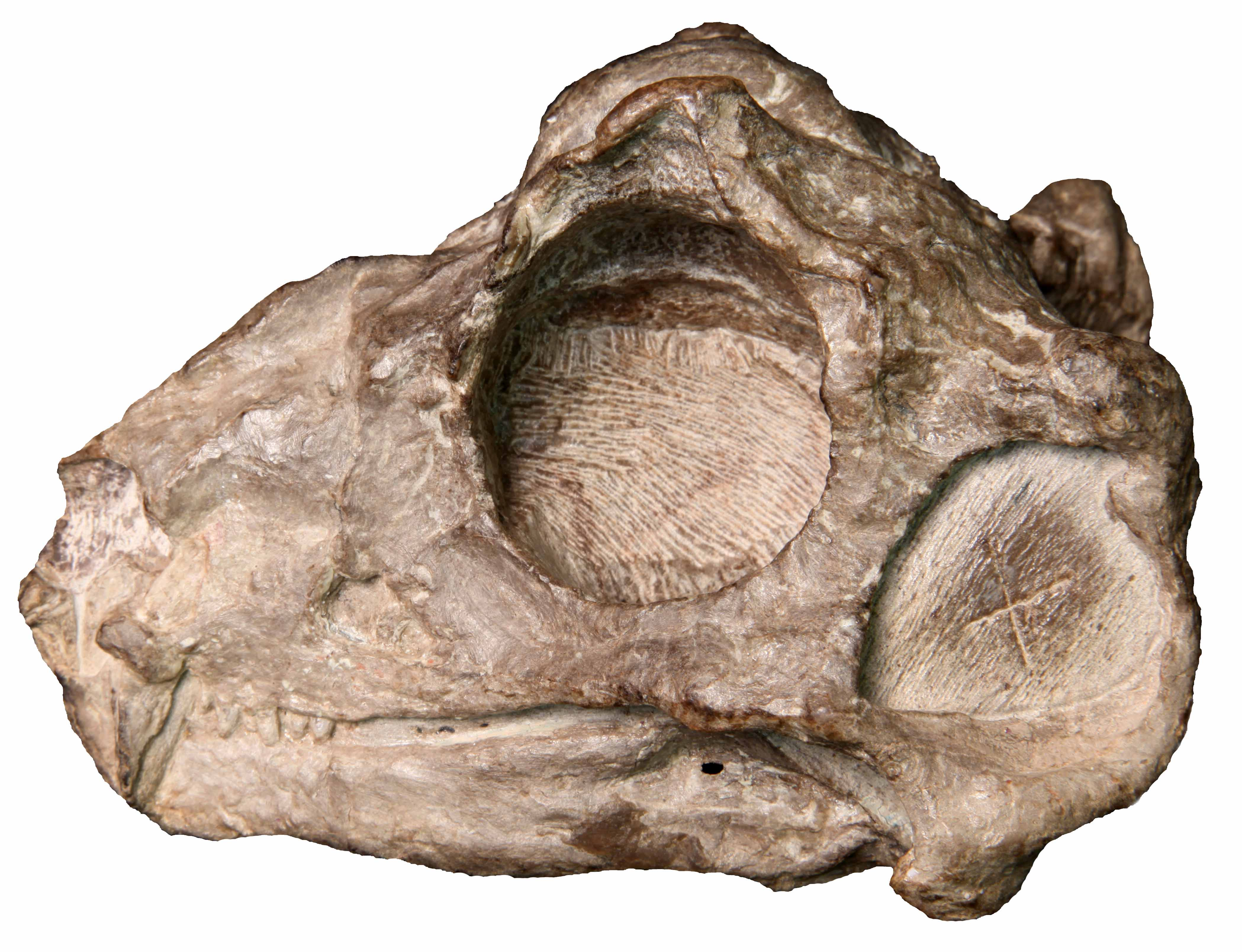
- MAL 290, the holotype of Lende chiweta

Scientific classification
- Kingdom: Animalia
- Phylum: Chordata
- Clade: Synapsida
- Clade: Therapsida
- Suborder: †Biarmosuchia
- Clade: †Burnetiamorpha
- Genus: †Lende; Kruger et al. 2015

Type species
- Lende chiweta Kruger et al. 2015

= Lende =

Lende Temporal range: Lopingian ~259–254 Ma

Extinct genus of therapsids

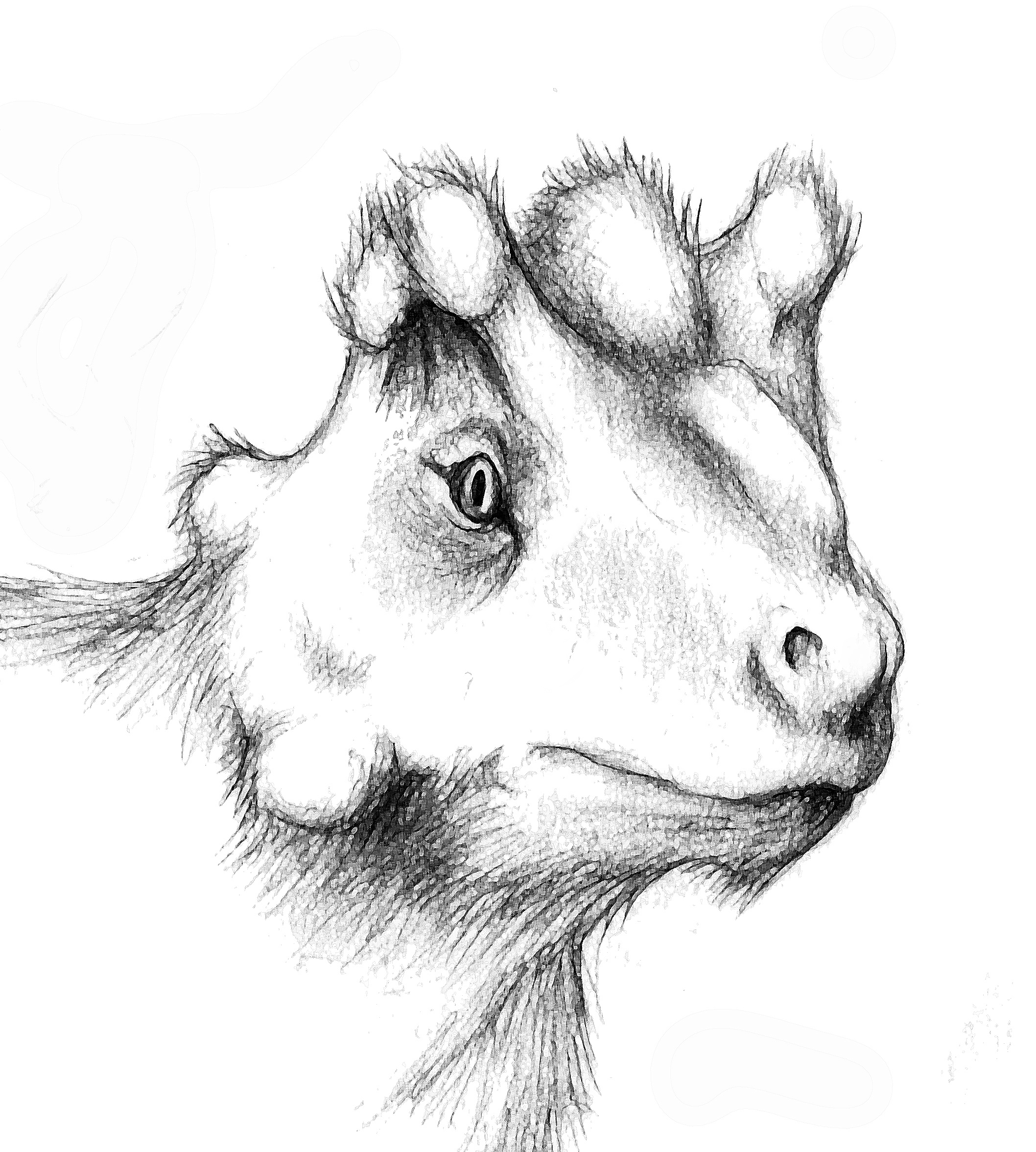
A reconstruction of L. chiweta

Lende is an extinct genus of biarmosuchian from Malawi. It contains one species, Lende chiweta, first described by Jacobs and colleagues in 2005 and is a burnetiamorph – a group of biarmosuchians characterized by numerous bosses and swellings on the skull. The type specimen was discovered in the early 1990s in the Permian Lower Bone Bed (B1) of the Chiweta Beds of Malawi, which are believed to correlate with the Cistecephalus Assemblage Zone of the South African Karoo Supergroup, the Usili Formation of Tanzania, and the Upper Madumabisa Mudstone of Zambia. The holotype of the genus Lende is MAL 290, which comprises an almost complete skull and lower jaw.
