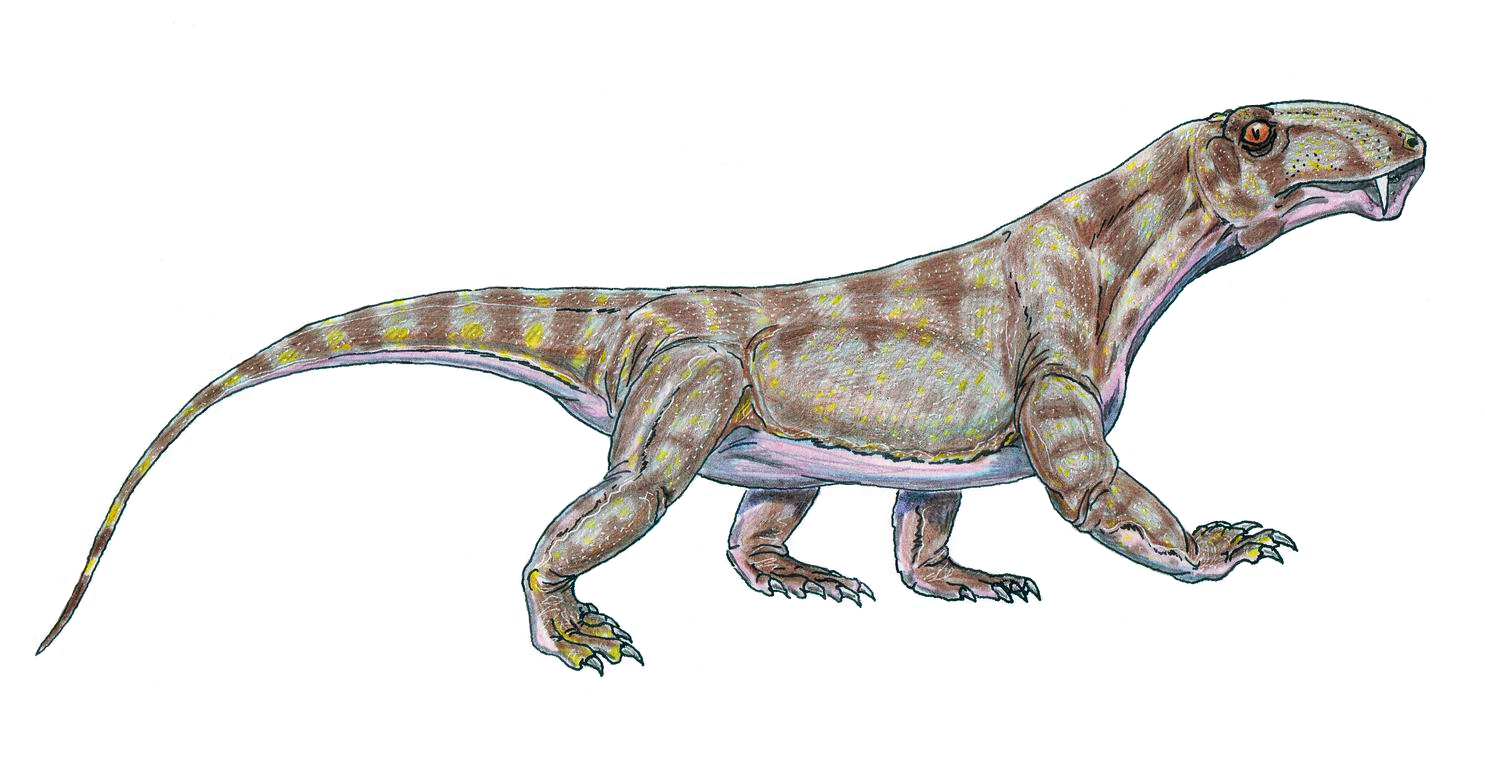
- Life restoration of Biarmosuchus

Scientific classification
- Kingdom: Animalia
- Phylum: Chordata
- Clade: Synapsida
- Clade: Therapsida
- Suborder: †Biarmosuchia
- Family: †Biarmosuchidae; Oslon, 1962

Genera
- †Biarmosuchoides; †Biarmosuchus

= Biarmosuchidae =

Biarmosuchids Temporal range: 268–265 Ma

Extinct family of therapsids

Biarmosuchidae is a family of biarmosuchian therapsids from Russia.
