= Alrausuchus =

Alrausuchus Temporal range: Middle Permian

Scientific classification
- Domain: Eukaryota
- Kingdom: Animalia
- Phylum: Chordata
- Clade: Synapsida
- Clade: Therapsida
- Suborder: †Biarmosuchia
- Family: †Alrausuchidae; Ivakhnenko, 2008
- Genus: †Alrausuchus; Ivakhnenko, 2008

Type species
- †Alrausuchus tagax Ivakhnenko, 1990

Extinct genus of therapsids

Alrausuchus is an extinct genus of biarmosuchian therapsids from Russia. It was named by M.F. Ivakhnenko in 2008, as a reclassification of the species Biarmosuchus tagax that Ivachnenko had named in 1990. Ivachnenko erected the monotypic family Alrausuchidae for the genus.
