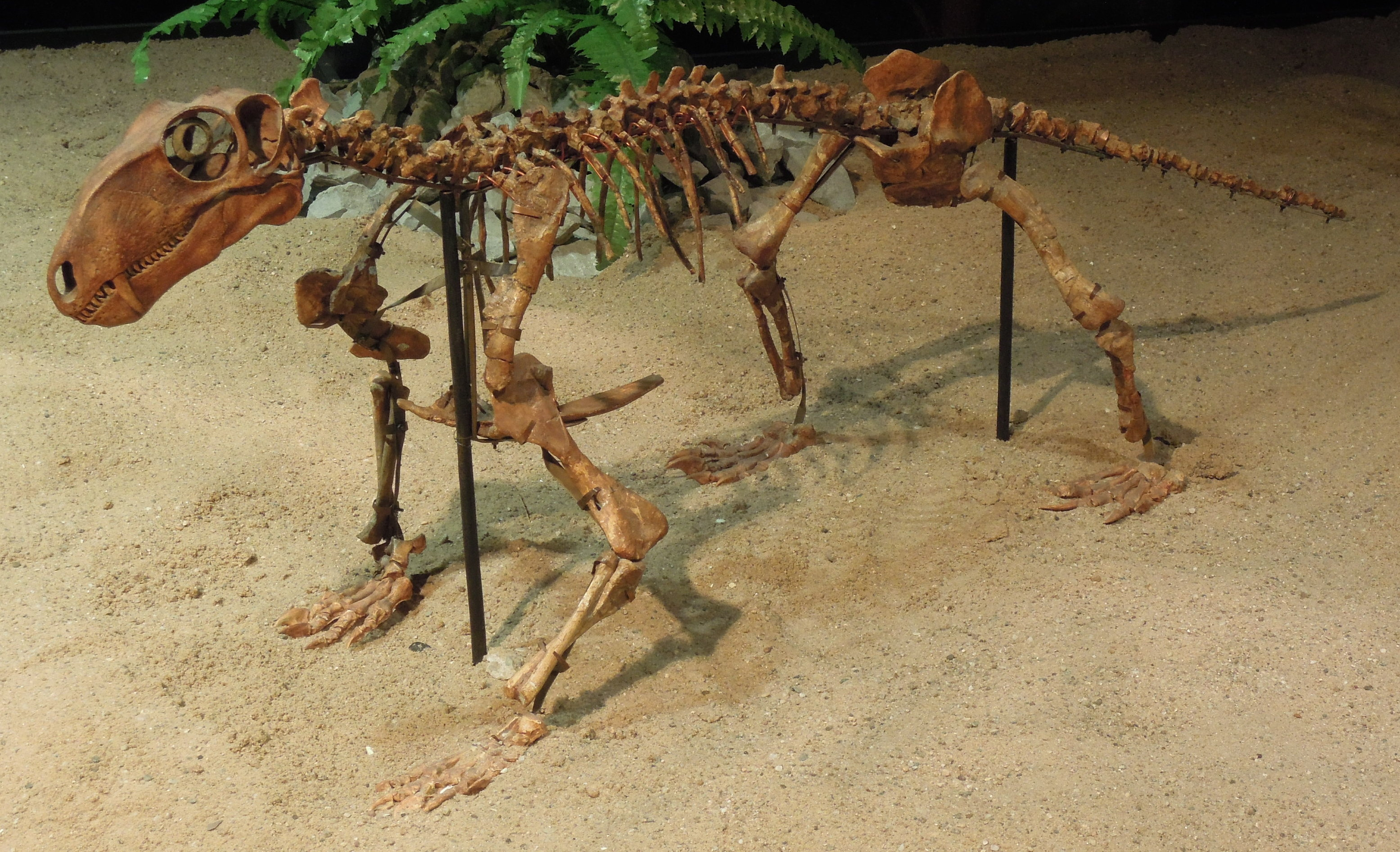
- Mounted skeleton of Biarmosuchus tener
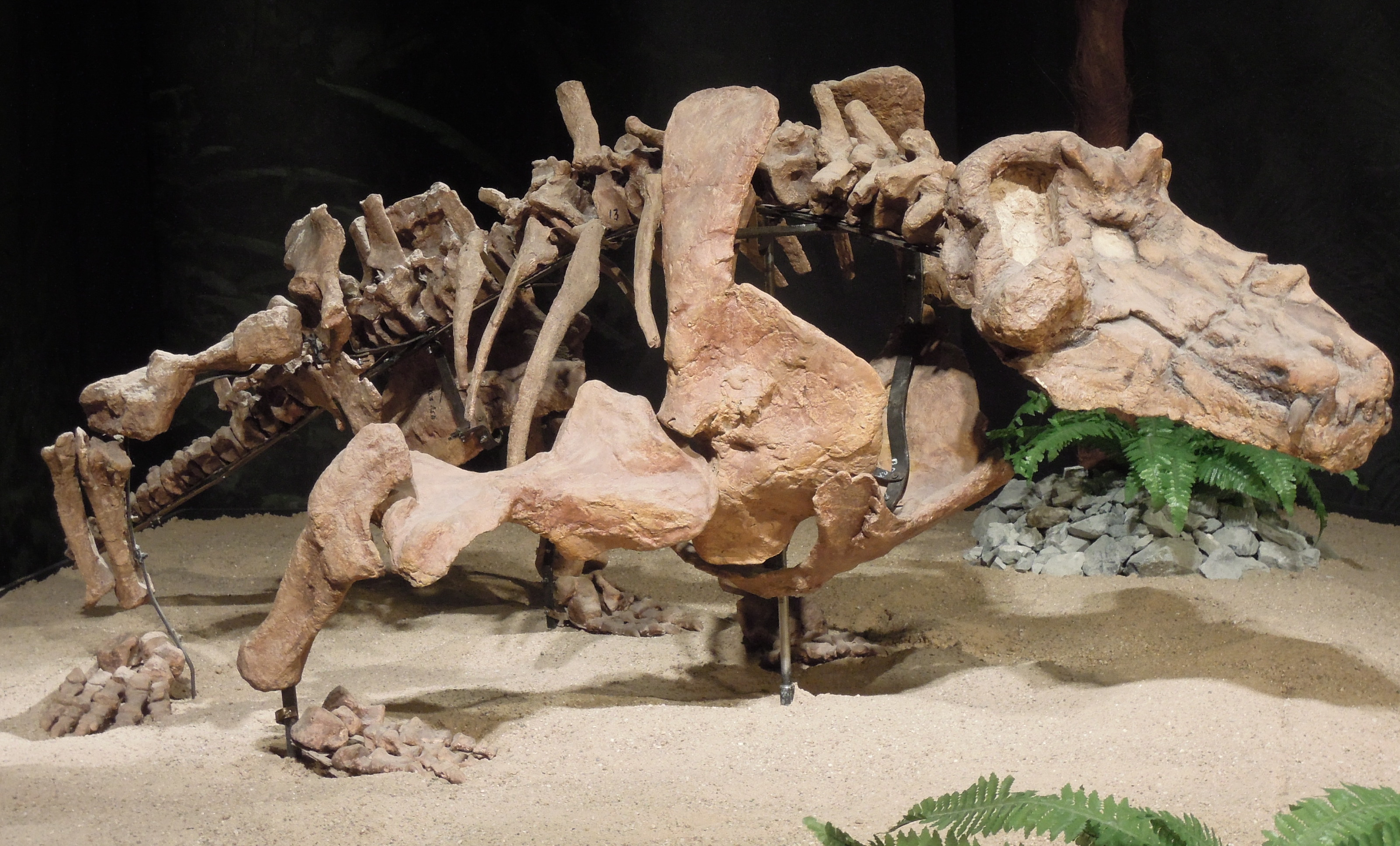
- Mounted skeleton of Estemmenosuchus uralensis

Scientific classification
- Kingdom: Animalia
- Phylum: Chordata
- Clade: Synapsida
- Clade: Therapsida
- Clade: †Dinomorpha; Ivachnenko, 2008 emmend. Duhamel et al., 2026

Subgroups
- †Biarmosuchia; †Dinocephalia

= Dinomorpha =

Dinomorpha Temporal range: Middle Permian - Late Permian, 274.4–252 Ma

Extinct clade of therapsids

Dinomorpha is a proposed clade of extinct therapsids uniting Biarmosuchia and Dinocephalia to the exclusion of other major therapsid groups. The usage of the grouping was introduced in a paper focusing on early therapsid evolution in eastern Europe. Most phylogentic analysis had supported the alternative, more traditional placement of biarmosuchians and dinocephalians in a pectinate arrangement relative to the clade Neotherapsida (Anomodontia and Theriodontia), a 2026 paper from Duhamel et al. focusing on the phylogenetic relationships of therapsids using exclusively on cranial characters, recovered a clade uniting Biarmosuchia and Dinocephalia. The authors recommended using Ivachnenko (2008) "Dinomorpha" as the available clade name for Biarmosuchia and Dinocephalia, along with using modern definitions for both members in a stem-based manner.
