= Rubidgina =

Rubidgina Temporal range: 259–254 Ma

Scientific classification
- Kingdom: Animalia
- Phylum: Chordata
- Clade: Synapsida
- Clade: Therapsida
- Suborder: †Biarmosuchia
- Genus: †Rubidgina; Broom, 1942
- Species: †R. angusticeps

Binomial name
- †Rubidgina angusticeps Broom, 1942

Extinct genus of mammal ancestors

Rubidgina is a genus of Biarmosuchian therapsid from Patrysfontein, Wellwood, South Africa known from RC 55, a skull with lower jaws. This specimen is a putative juvenile. It has been suggested that this specimen actually represents a juvenile of Herpetoskylax hopsoni. However, because the specimen lacks distinctive features, it cannot be determined if it is actually a juvenile of Herpetoskylax or if its current name of Rubidgina should remain.
