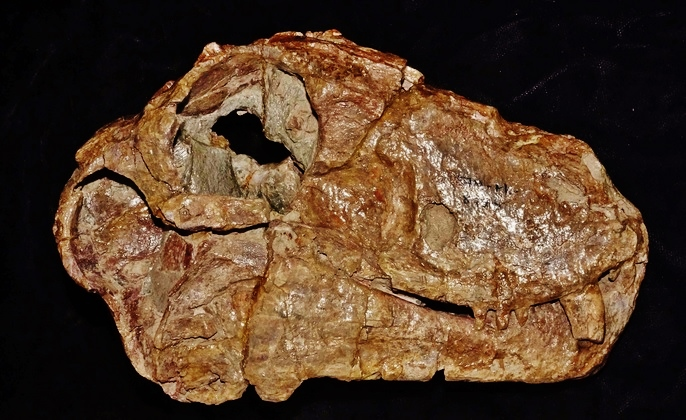

Scientific classification
- Kingdom: Animalia
- Phylum: Chordata
- Clade: Synapsida
- Clade: Therapsida
- Suborder: †Biarmosuchia
- Family: †Hipposauridae
- Genus: †Hipposaurus; Haughton, 1929

Species
- H. boonstrai; H. brinki

= Hipposaurus =

Hipposaurus Temporal range: Capitanian, 262–260 Ma

Extinct genus of therapsids

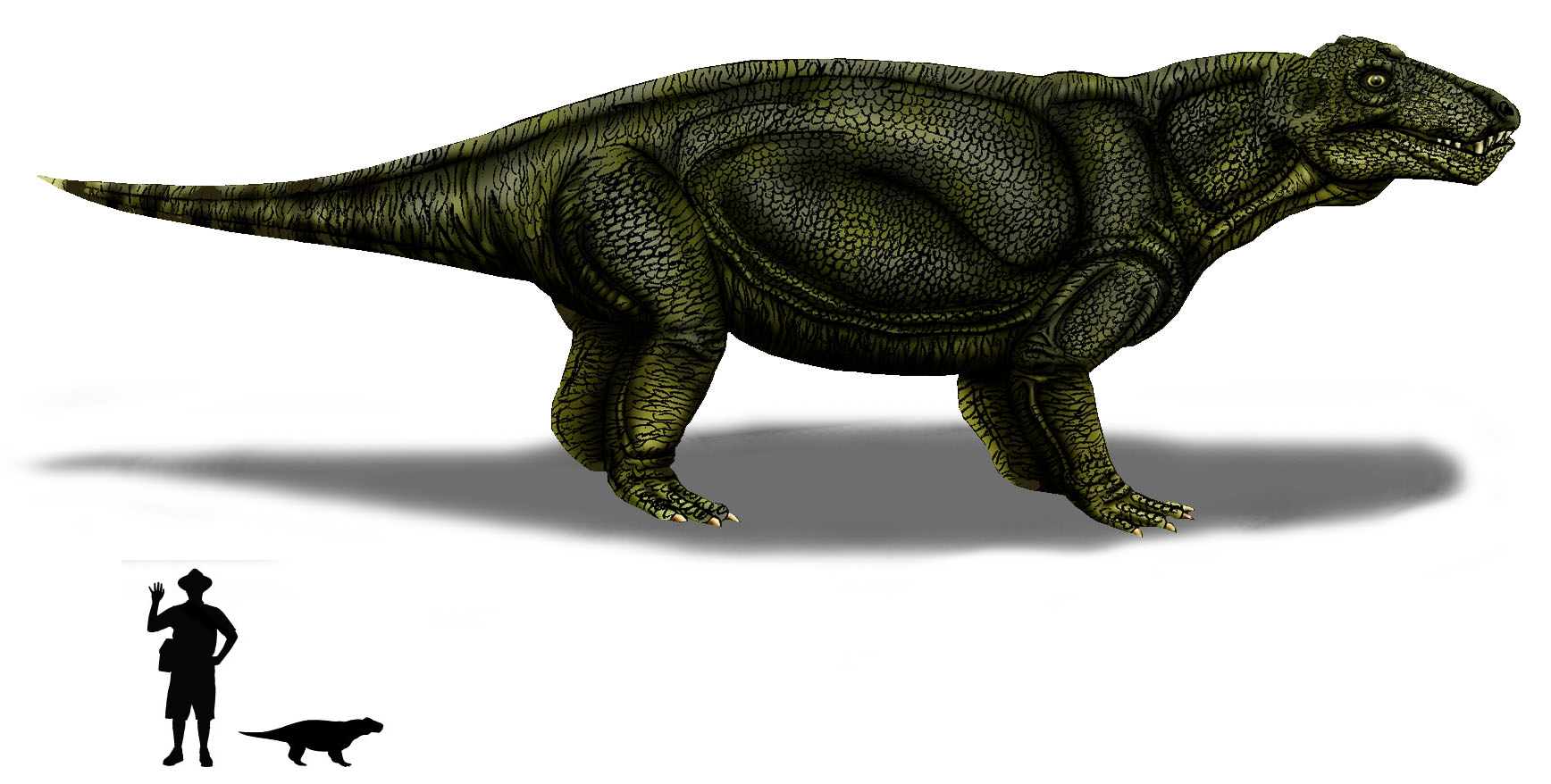
Restoration of H. boonstrai

Hipposaurus ('horse lizard') is an extinct genus of basal therapsids known from the Tapinocephalus Assemblage Zone of the Main Karoo Basin, South Africa. Chronologically this is within the Capitanian stage of the Guadalupian Series (Middle Permian). The genus was first described by S.H. Haughton as H. boonstrai on the basis of a skull and associated skeleton and was later considered a gorgonopsian in the family 'Ictidorhinidae' by Robert Broom. It is now considered a basal biarmosuchian, but its affinities remain uncertain. Some authors note the similarity of its braincase with that of Herpetoskylax. H. boonstrai is currently known from only two specimens in the Iziko South African Museum, Cape Town.

"H. brinki" is based on a single skull that was described by D. Sigogneau in 1970; however, the poor condition of the holotype means most considerations of biarmosuchians ignore it.

== See also ==
- List of therapsids
