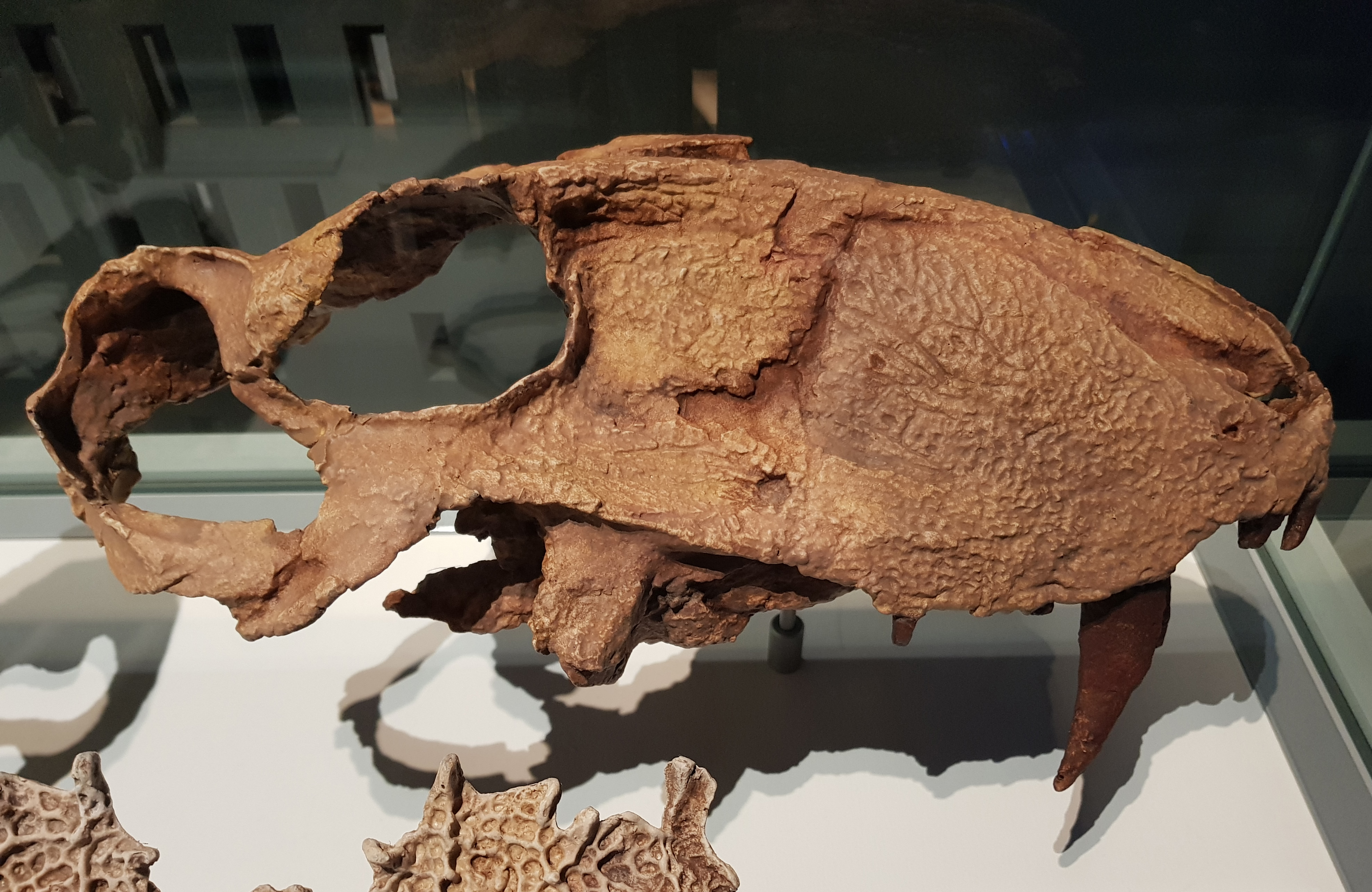
- Skull cast

Scientific classification
- Kingdom: Animalia
- Phylum: Chordata
- Clade: Synapsida
- Clade: Therapsida
- Suborder: †Biarmosuchia
- Family: †Eotitanosuchidae
- Genus: †Eotitanosuchus; Tchudinov, 1960
- Species: †E. olsoni

Binomial name
- †Eotitanosuchus olsoni Tchudinov, 1960

Synonyms
- Ivantosaurus Tchudinov, 1983

= Eotitanosuchus =

Eotitanosuchus Temporal range: Wordian, 267 Ma

Extinct genus of therapsids

Eotitanosuchus ("dawn giant crocodile") is an extinct genus of biarmosuchian therapsids whose fossils were found in the town of Ochyor in Perm Krai, Russia. It lived about 267 million years ago. The only species is Eotitanosuchus olsoni.

== Description ==
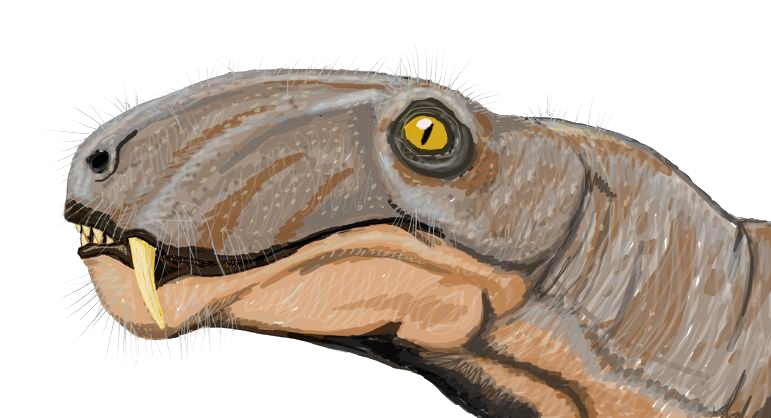
Life restoration

Eotitanosuchus is known from a single large skull without a lower jaw. The skull was 35 cm (14 in), but the overall length may have been over 2.5 m (8 ft 2 in), possibly up to 6 m (20 ft) and more than 600 kg (1,300 lb) in weight for adult specimens. Like Biarmosuchus tener, it was primitive in that, though it was a predator, the temple opening behind the eye was small, giving it a weak bite. The temple was, however, larger at the top than in other biarmosuchians.

== Paleobiology ==
Eotitanosuchus fossils were found in the Perm (or Cis-Urals) region of Russia. Eotitanosuchus was without doubt a dominant animal of its environment. Found preserved in flood deposits (once coastal bogs) containing many skeletons of estemmenosuchids, it has been suggested that this large predator was an excellent swimmer, possibly semi-aquatic or frequenting marshy ground. This, however, is just speculation.

== Classification ==
Eotitanosuchus is often grouped with the Phthinosuchidae and the Biarmosuchidae. In fact, Ivakhnenko (1999) argues that Biarmosuchus tener and Eotitanosuchus olsoni are the same organism, which would eliminate the Eotitanosuchia as a separate taxon, though this conclusion does not seem to have been widely accepted. Regardless of the eventual outcome of this debate, Ivakhnenko's paper does seem to show that Eotitanosuchus is very similar to Biarmosuchus. Further, given the rather close similarity between Eotitanosuchus and later therapsids, this observation supports the view that Biarmosuchia is paraphyletic. Others view Eotitanosuchus as quite distinct from other basal therapsids and perhaps closer to the Gorgonopsia but gorgonopsian specializations are either not present in Eotitanosuchus or, as is more often the case, the state of the characters is unknown. This genus is characterized by many primitive features of the septomaxilla, the postorbital, the parietal, the interparietal, the basioccipital, the quadrate rami of the pterygoid and the vomers of the skull. The length of the dorsal process of the premaxilla (front jawbone) and the postorbital twisting (rear side of the skull) constitute specializations that indicate it is not a direct gorgonopsian ancestor. These features, however, are shared by the anteosaur and biarmosuchid lineages.

== See also ==
- List of therapsids
