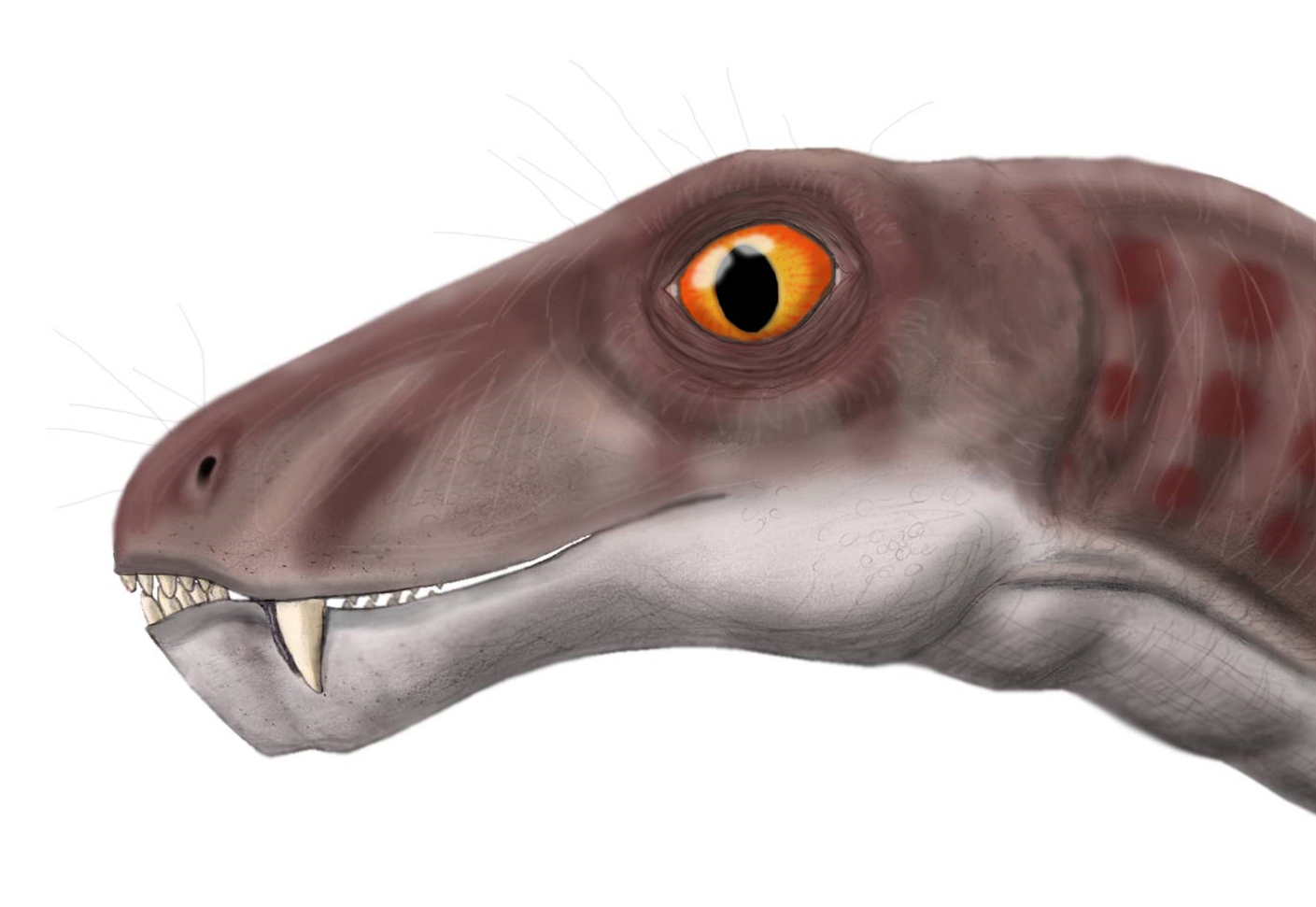
- Life restoration of Ictidorhinus martinsi

Scientific classification
- Domain: Eukaryota
- Kingdom: Animalia
- Phylum: Chordata
- Clade: Synapsida
- Clade: Therapsida
- Suborder: †Biarmosuchia
- Family: †Ictidorhinidae; Broom, 1932
- Genus: †Ictidorhinus; Broom, 1913

Type species
- †Ictidorhinus martinsi Broom, 1913

= Ictidorhinus =

Ictidorhinus Temporal range: Late Permian

Extinct genus of therapsids

Ictidorhinus is an extinct genus of biarmosuchian therapsids. Fossils have been found from the Dicynodon Assemblage Zone of the Beaufort Group in the Karoo Basin, South Africa and are of Late Permian age. It had a short snout and proportionally large orbits. These characteristics may be representative of a juvenile animal, possibly of Lycaenodon. However, these two genera are not known to have existed at the same time, making it unlikely for Ictidorhinus material to be from a juvenile form of Lycaenodon.

Ictidorhinus is the best-known representative of the family Ictidorhinidae, named by South African paleontologist Robert Broom in 1932. Many biarmosuchians have been identified as ictidorhinids since the family was first named, mostly on the basis of their small size. Several biarmosuchians from Russia have been classified as ictidorhinids on the basis of partial jaw bones alone. Recent phylogenetic studies of biarmosuchians have found that Ictidorhinidae is a paraphyletic collection of species that fall outside the more derived clade Burnetiamorpha.

== See also ==
- List of therapsids
