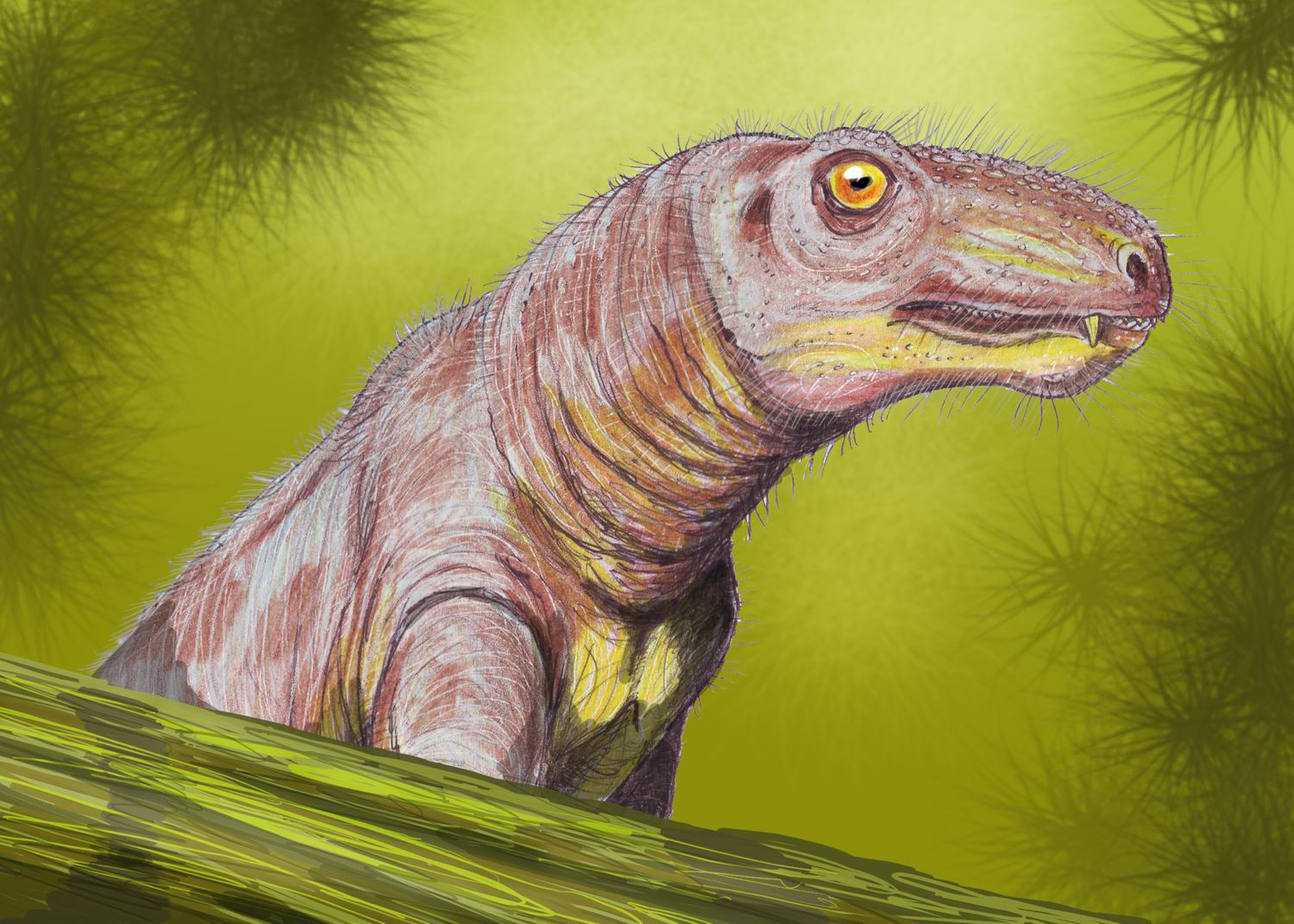

Scientific classification
- Domain: Eukaryota
- Kingdom: Animalia
- Phylum: Chordata
- Clade: Synapsida
- Clade: Therapsida
- Genus: †Microurania; Ivakhnenko, 1995
- Species: †M. minima

Binomial name
- †Microurania minima Ivakhnenko, 1995

= Microurania =

Microurania Temporal range: Wordian

Extinct genus of therapsids

Microurania is an extinct genus of therapsids from the Middle Permian first named and described by Mikhaïl Ivakhnenko. It is known from a single partial skull found in the region of Orenburg, Russia. According to Kammerer, 2011, it likely represents the remains of a juvenile dinocephalian.

== Skull ==
Microurania was small, with a skull of about 5 cm in length, though the postorbital portion of the skull is missing. It has a leaf-like postcanine tooth similar to the one on Phthinosuchus. It was probably omnivorous.

== See also ==
- List of therapsids
