= Lycaenodon =

Lycaenodon Temporal range: Late Permian

Scientific classification
- Kingdom: Animalia
- Phylum: Chordata
- Clade: Synapsida
- Clade: Therapsida
- Suborder: †Biarmosuchia
- Genus: †Lycaenodon; Broom, 1925

Type species
- †Lycaenodon longiceps Broom, 1925

Extinct genus of therapsids

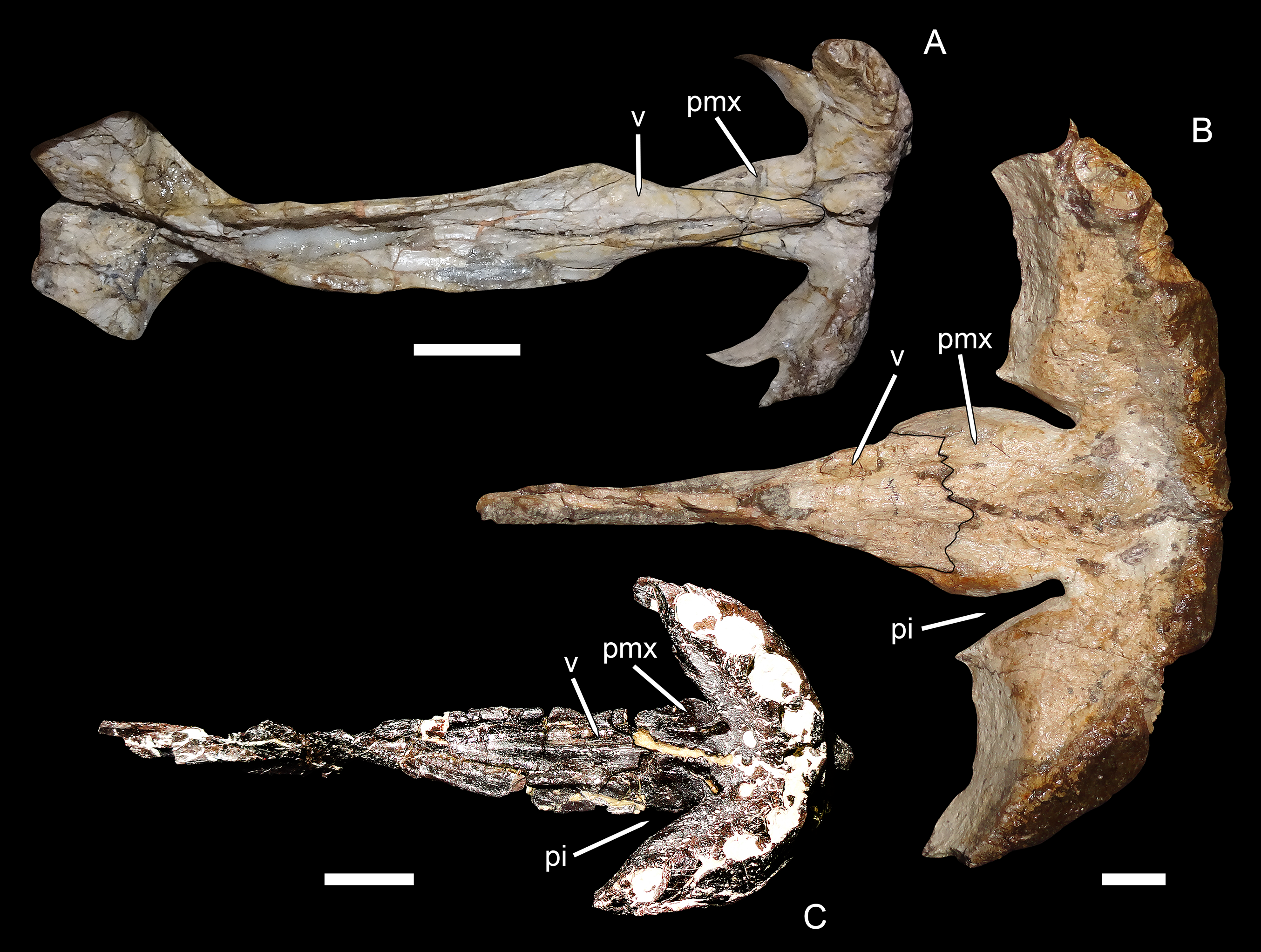
Premaxillary-vomerine complex in Lycaenodon (A) and other genera

Lycaenodon is an extinct genus of biarmosuchian therapsids from the Late Permian of South Africa. It is known from a single species, Lycaenodon longiceps, which was named by South African paleontologist Robert Broom in 1925. Both are small-bodied biarmosuchians. Two specimens are known, and both preserve only the front portions of the skull. These specimens come from the Cistecephalus Assemblage Zone of the Karoo Basin. Broom attributed the back portion of a third skull to Lycaenodon, but subsequent examiners considered it to belong to a gorgonopsian or dinocephalian and not a biarmosuchian. Most of the distinguishing features of Lycaenodon come from its palate. As a member of Biarmosuchia, the most basal group of therapsids, Lycaenodon shares many features with earlier and less mammal-like synapsids like Dimetrodon.

A 2012 phylogenetic analysis of biarmosuchians found Lycaenodon to be a close relative of the derived clade Burnetiamorpha.
