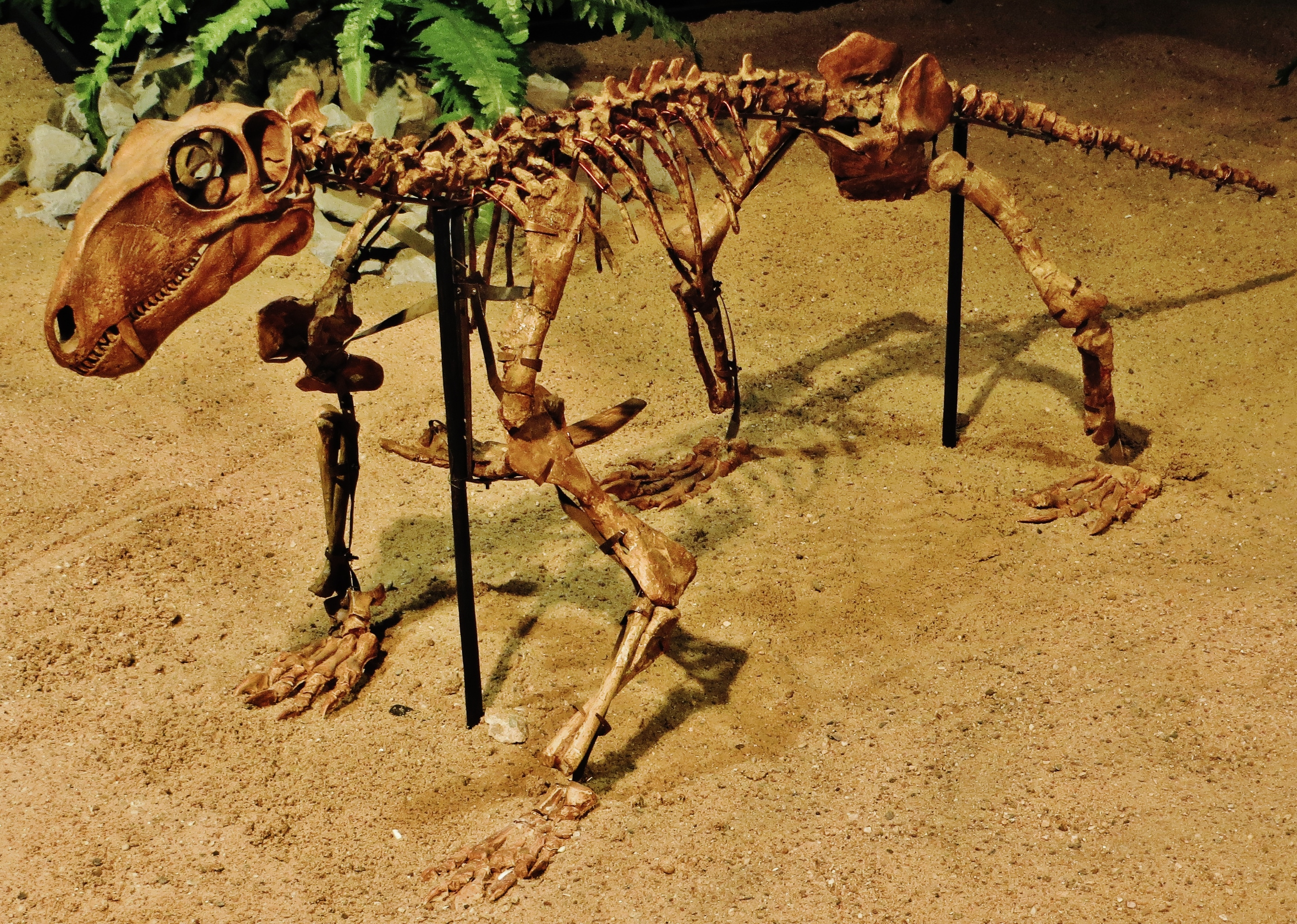
- Mounted skeleton of Biarmosuchus tener

Scientific classification
- Kingdom: Animalia
- Phylum: Chordata
- Clade: Synapsida
- Clade: Therapsida
- Suborder: †Biarmosuchia; Sigogneau-Russell, 1989

Subgroups
- †Alrausuchus; †Herpetoskylax; †Ictidorhinus; †Lycaenodon; †Microurania; †Niaftasuchus; †Rubidgina; †Ustia; †Wantulignathus; †Biarmosuchidae; †Burnetiamorpha; †Eotitanosuchidae; †Hipposauridae; †Nikkasauridae

= Biarmosuchia =

Biarmosuchia Temporal range: Middle Permian - Late Permian, 272.5–252 Ma

Extinct suborder of therapsids

Biarmosuchia is an extinct clade of Permian non-mammalian therapsids. One of the earliest diverging therapsid groups, they were moderately-sized, lightly built carnivores, intermediate in form between basal sphenacodont "pelycosaurs" and more advanced therapsids. Biarmosuchians were rare components of Permian ecosystems, and the majority of species belong to the clade Burnetiamorpha, which are characterized by elaborate cranial ornamentation.

== Characteristics ==
Cranial ornamentation in burnetiamorph biarmosuchians

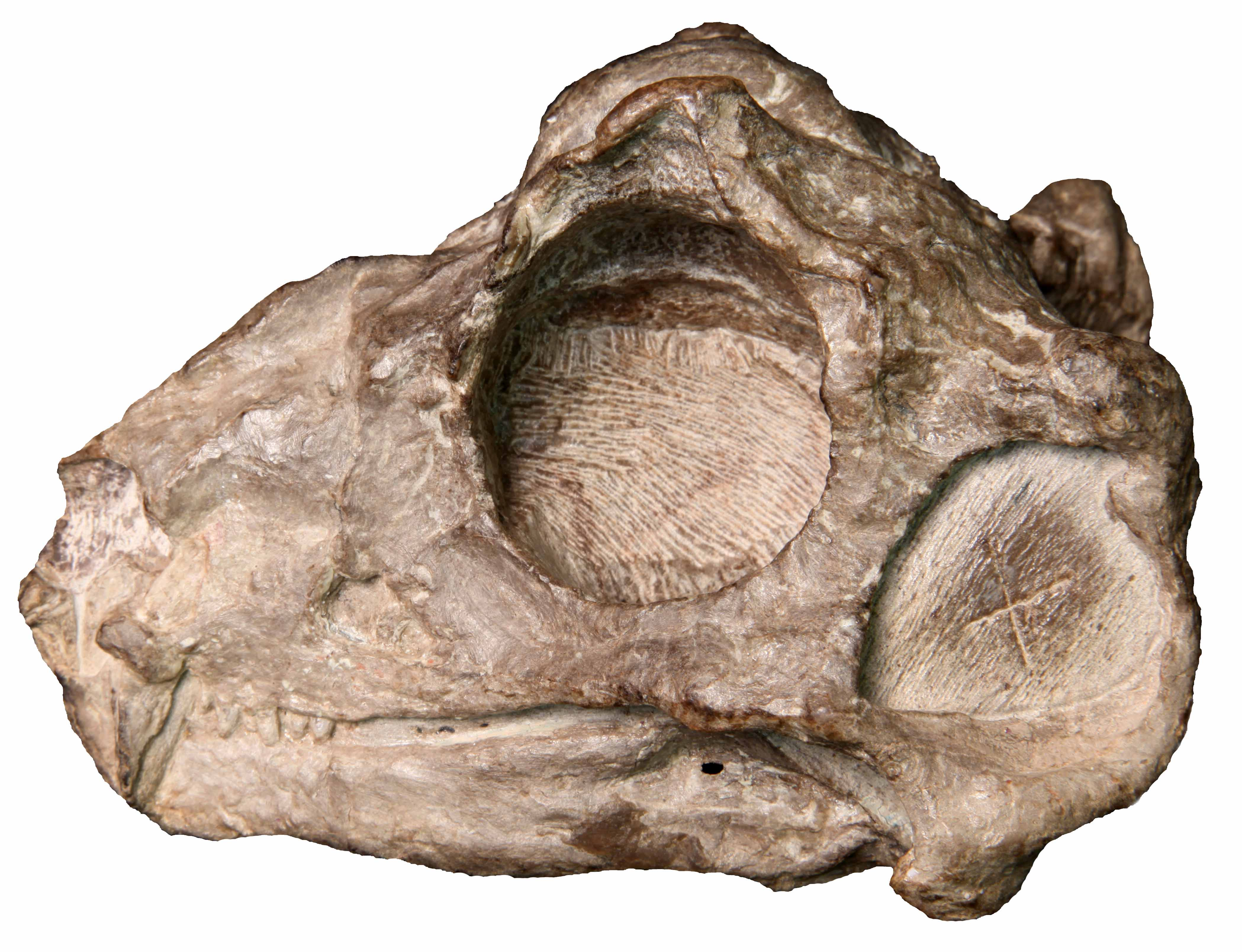
Lende

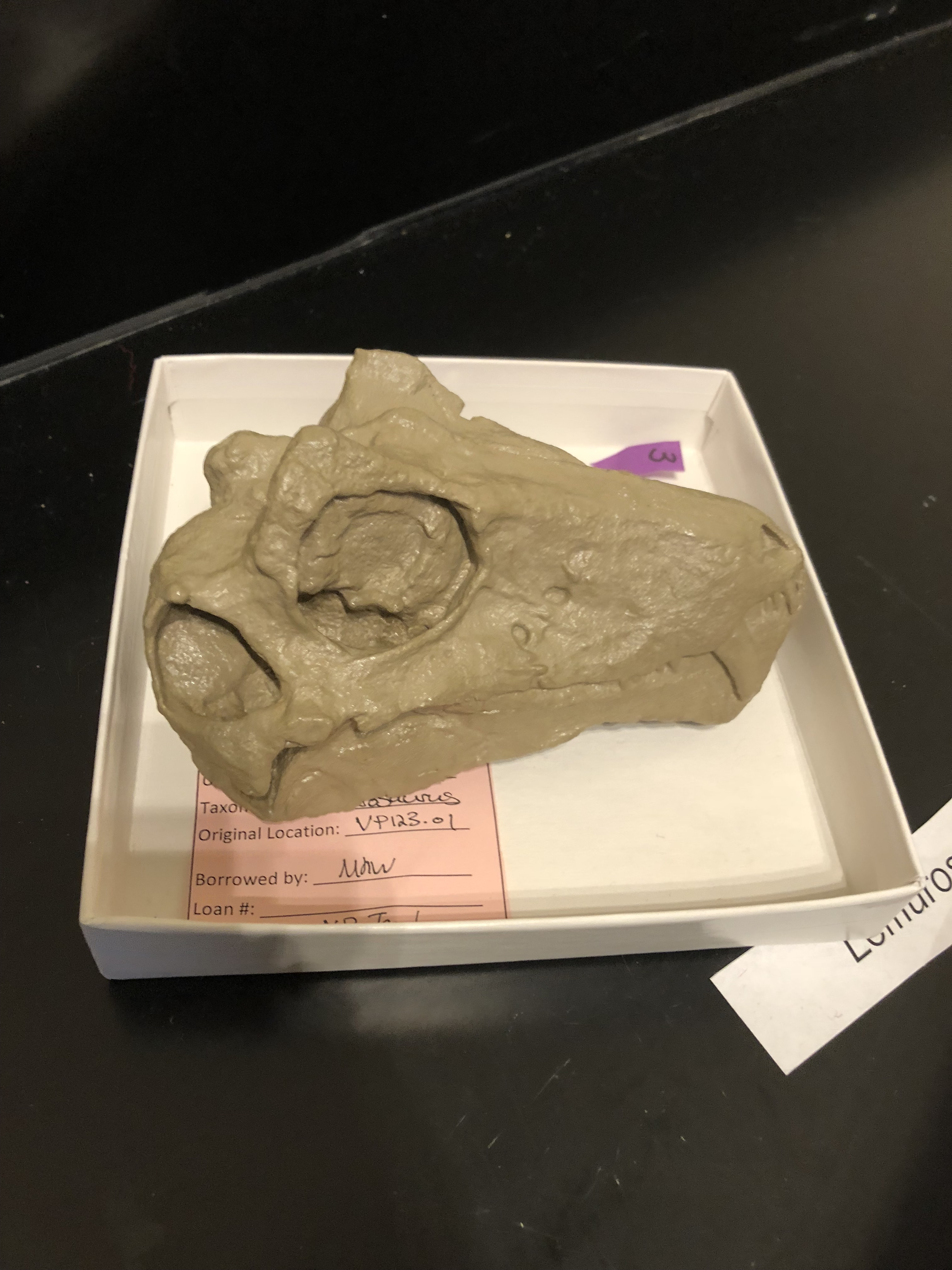
Lemurosaurus

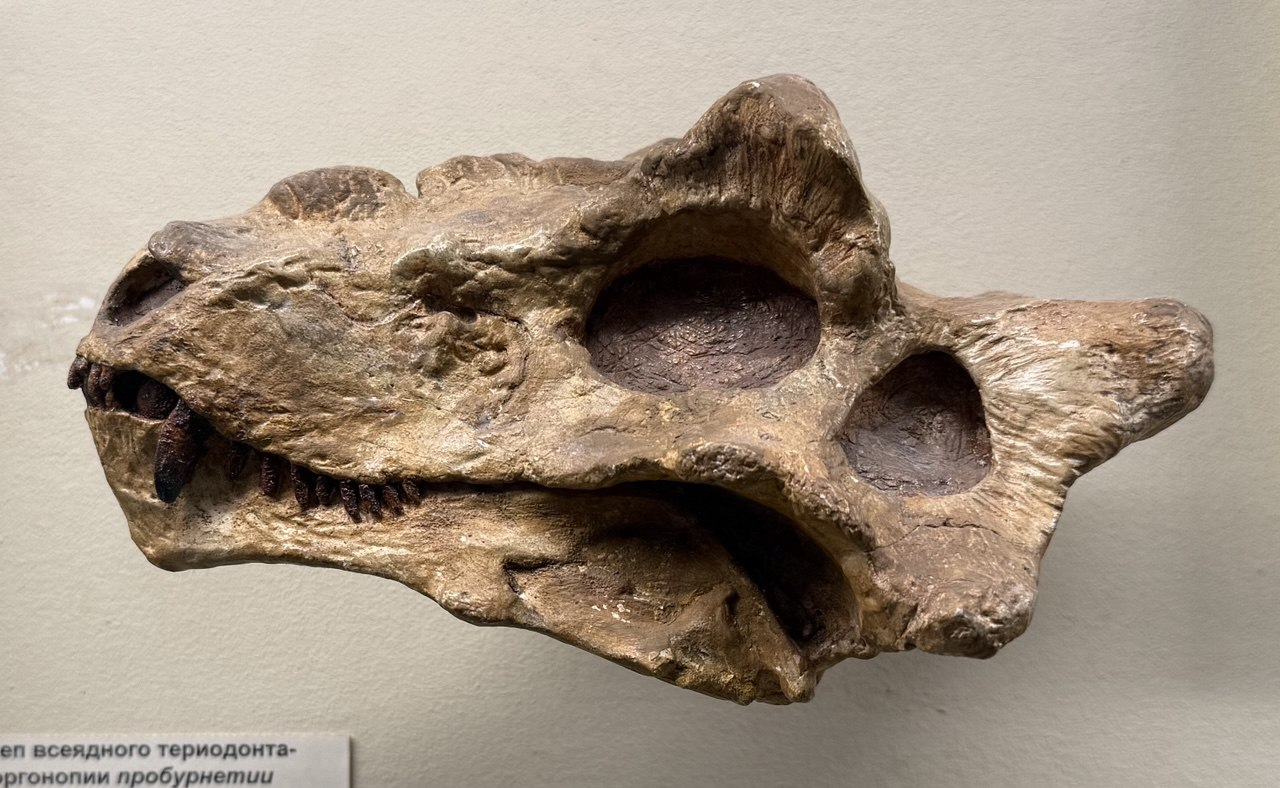
Proburnetia

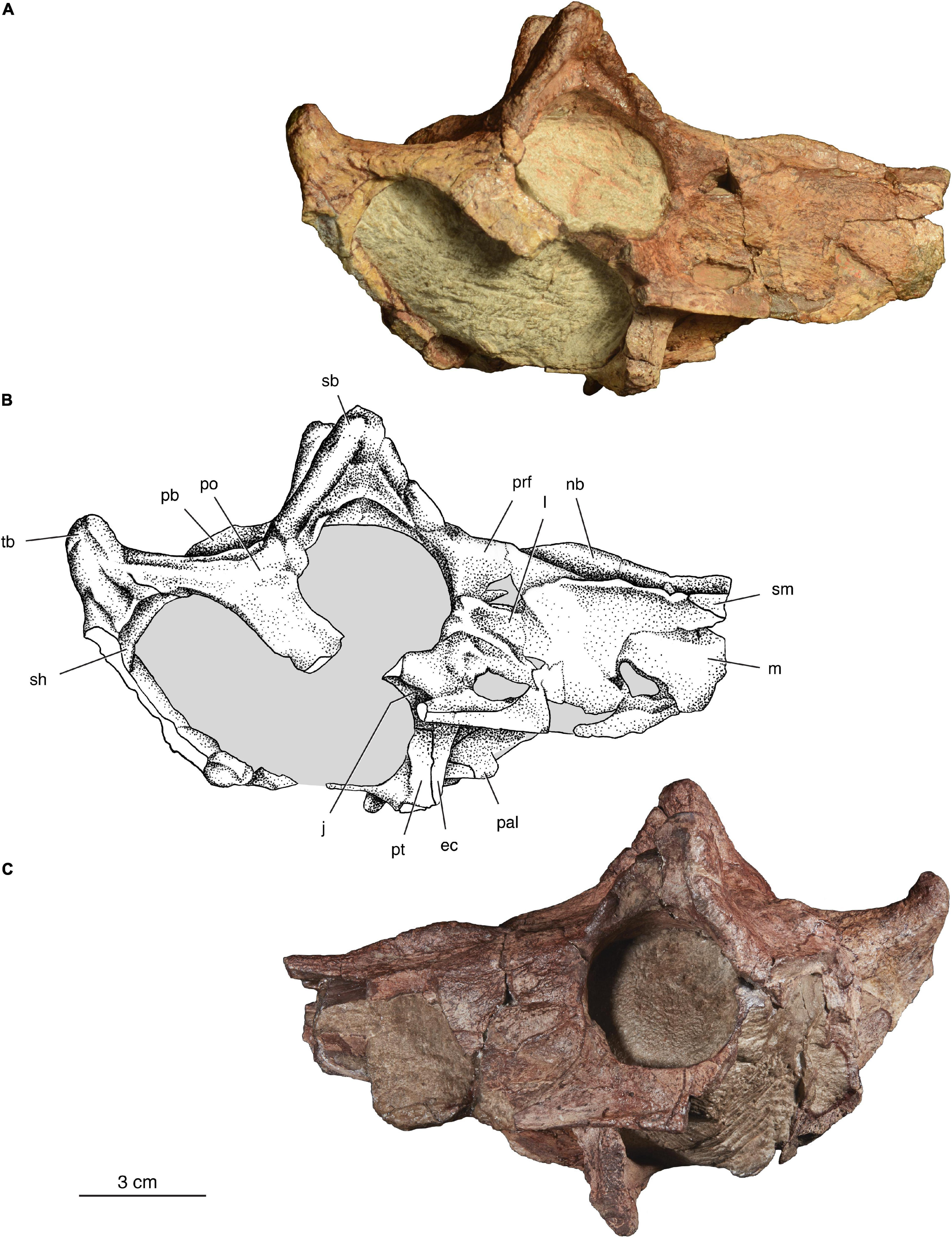
Isengops

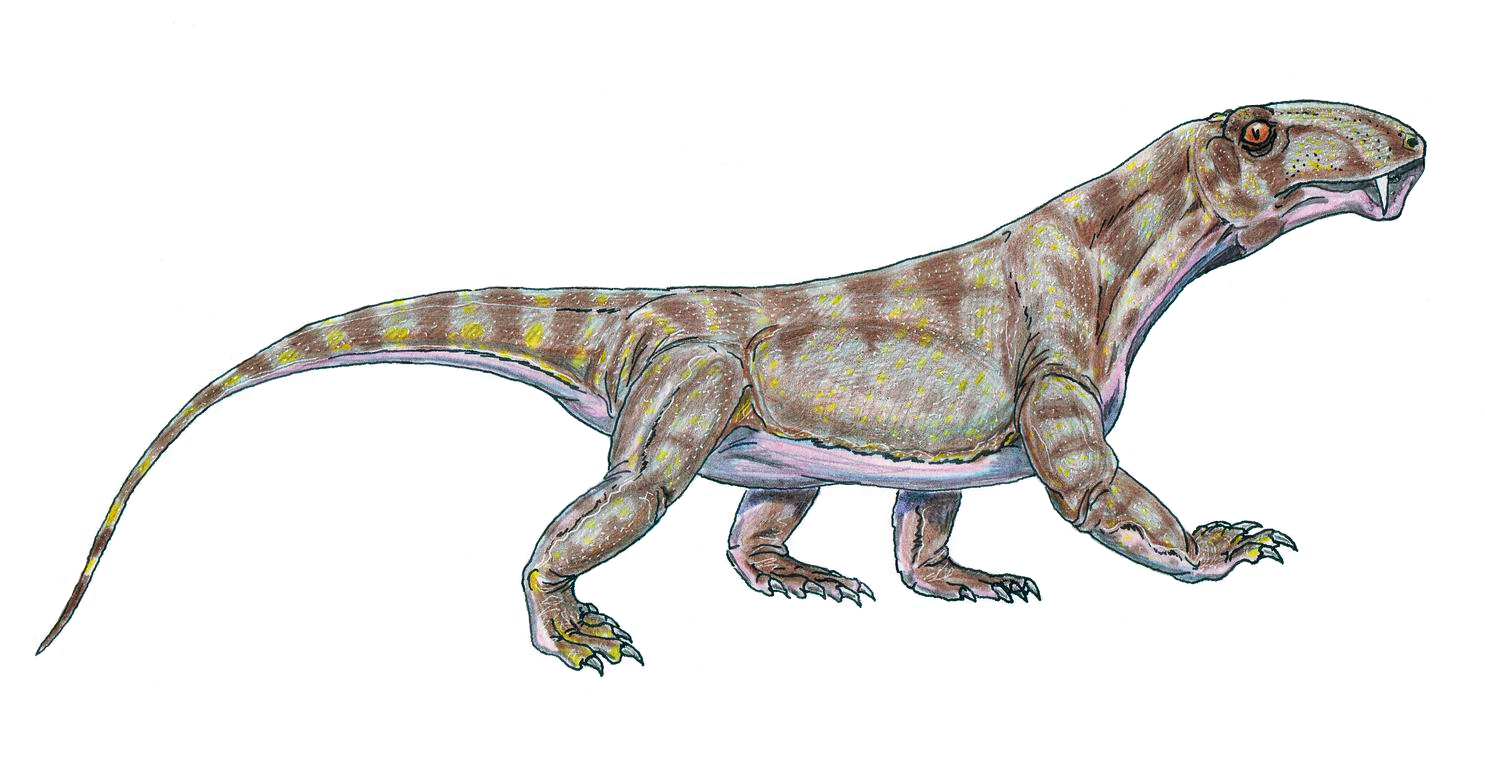
Life restoration of Biarmosuchus

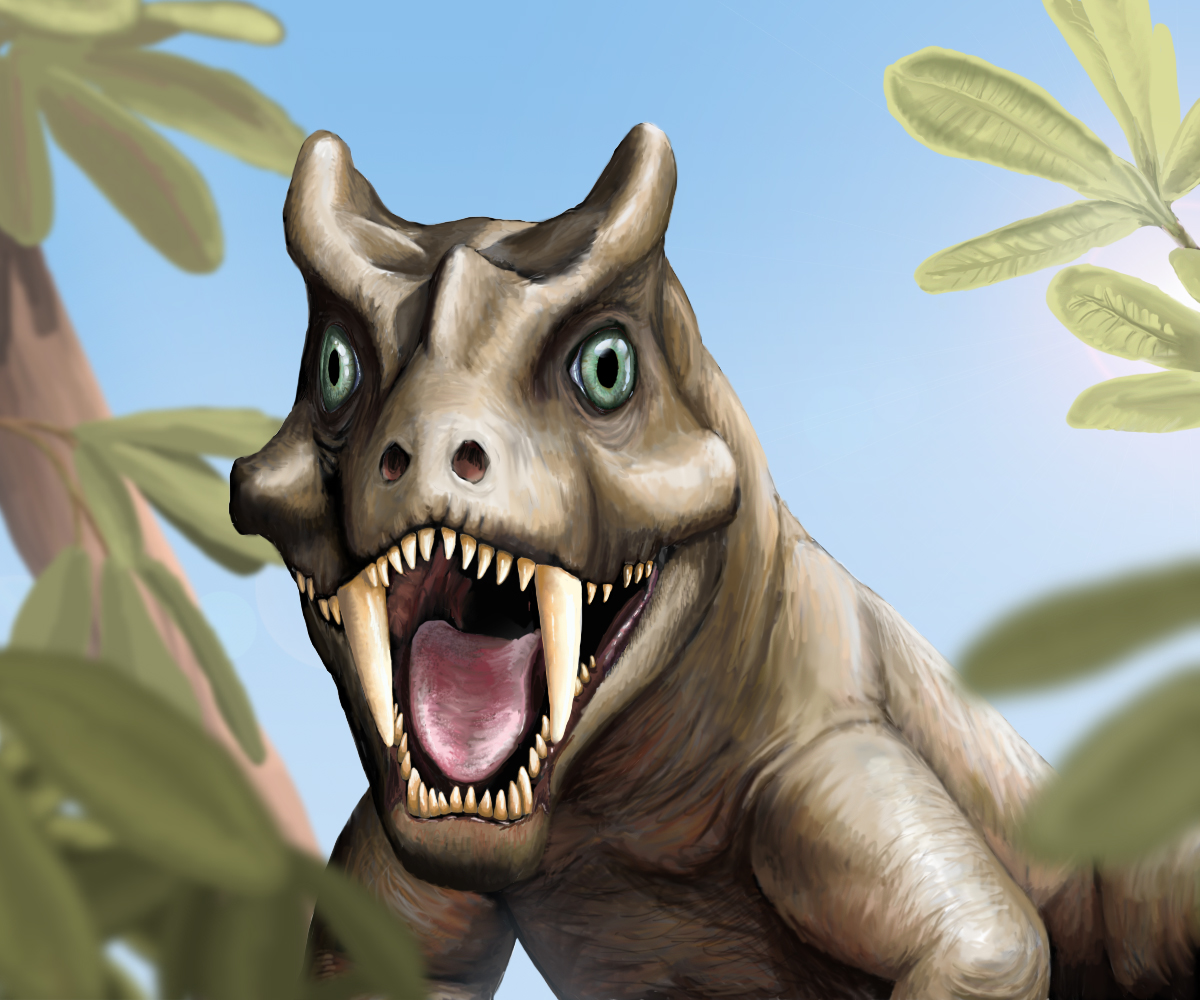
Life restoration of the head of Lophorhinus , showing elaborate cranial ornamentation

The biarmosuchian skull is very similar to the sphenacodontid skull, differing only in the larger temporal fenestra (although these are still small relative to later therapsids), slightly backward-sloping occiput (the reverse of the pelycosaur condition), reduced number of teeth, and single large canine teeth in both upper and lower jaws, and other features (Carroll 1988 pp. 370, Benton 2000 p. 114). In later specialised Biarmosuchia, these resemble the enlarged canines of the Gorgonopsia. The presence of larger jaw-closing muscles (and hence a stronger bite) is indicated by the flaring of the rear of the skull where these muscles were attached. Burnetiamorphs, which made up the majority of biarmosuchian diversity, were characterized by elaborate cranial ornamentation consisting of bumps and bosses. Some burnetiids have a thick domed skull reminiscent of dinocephalians and pachycephalosaur dinosaurs.

The vertebrae are also sphenacodontid-like (but lack the long neural spines that distinguish Dimetrodon and its kin), but the shoulder and pelvic girdles and the limbs indicate a much more advanced posture. The feet are more symmetrical, indicating that they faced forward throughout the stride, and the phalanges (fingers/toes) are reduced in length so that they are more like that of later synapsids (therapsids and mammals) (Carroll 1988 pp. 370–1).

Biarmosuchians ranged in size from relatively small species with skulls 10–15 cm in length to large species such as Biarmosuchus, which may have had a skull 60 centimetres (24 in) in length.

== Distribution ==
Currently the most representative group of the Biarmosuchia, the Burnetiamorpha, comprise ten genera: Bullacephalus, Burnetia, Lemurosaurus, Lobalopex, Lophorhinus, Paraburnetia, and Pachydectes from South Africa, Niuksenitia and Proburnetia from Russia, and Lende (MAL 290) from Malawi. In addition, Sidor et al. (2010) recently described a partial skull roof including the dorsal margin of orbits and parietal foramen of an unnamed burnetiid from the upper Permian of Tanzania, and Sidor et al. (2014) noted the presence of a burnetiid in the middle Permian of Zambia. Other Biarmosuchia include Biarmosuchus from Russia, Hipposaurus, Herpetoskylax, Ictidorhinus and Lycaenodon from South Africa, and Wantulignathus from Zambia.

== Classification ==
- - Biarmosuchus
  - - Hipposaurus
    - - - Ictidorhinus
        - - Herpetoskylax
          - Lycaenodon
      - Burnetiamorpha
        - Lemurosaurus
        - - - Bullacephalus
            - Pachydectes
          - - Lobalopex
            - - Lophorhinus
              - - Niuksenitia
                - Burnetiidae
                  - Proburnetia
                  - - Burnetia
                    - - Paraburnetia
                      - - Leucocephalus
                        - Lende

Phylogeny of Biarmosuchia from Day et al., 2018

Biarmosuchians are typically considered the most basal (earliest diverging) major lineage of therapsids, though other studies have suggested that Dinocephalia is equally basal as Biarmosuchia, and may even form a clade with them to the exclusion of other major therapsid groups (which one study dubbed Dinomorpha).

Biarmosuchia consists of a paraphyletic series of basal biarmosuchians that are fairly typical early therapsids, and the derived clade Burnetiamorpha, characterized by skulls ornamented by horns and bosses.

=== Taxonomic history ===
Biarmosuchians were the last of the six major therapsid lineages to be recognized. The majority of biarmosuchians were once considered gorgonopsians. James Hopson and Herbert Richard Barghusen (1986 p. 88) tentatively united Biarmosuchidae and Ictidorhinidae (including Hipposauridae and Rubidginidae) as "Biarmosuchia", but were undecided as to whether they constituted a natural group or an assemblage that had in common only shared primitive characteristics. They thought that Phthinosuchus was too poorly known to tell if it also belonged, but considered Eotitanosuchus a more advanced form.

Denise Sigogneau-Russell (1989) erected the infraorder Biarmosuchia to include the families Biarmosuchidae, Hipposauridae and Ictidorhinidae, distinct from Eotitanosuchia and Phthinosuchia.

Ivakhnenko (1999) argued that Biarmosuchus tener, Eotitanosuchus olsoni, and Ivantosaurus ensifer, all known from the Ezhovo locality, Ocher Faunal Assemblage, are actually the same species. Even if these taxa are shown to be distinct, Ivakhnenko's paper indicates that Eotitanosuchus and Biarmosuchus are very similar animals. Ivakhnenko also relocates the family Eotitanosuchidae to the order Titanosuchia, superorder Dinocephalia.

Benton 2000 and 2004 gives the Biarmosuchia the rank of suborder.

== Paleoecology ==
Biarmosuchians were rare components of their ecosystems; only one specimen is known for most species. However, they were moderately diverse and there were multiple contemporary species in some ecosystems. All were predators similar to gorgonopsians and therocephalians, though they were generally not apex predators.

== See also ==
- Evolution of mammals
- Permian tetrapods
- Tetraceratops
