= Kunpania =

Kunpania Temporal range: Middle–Late Permian? ~Capitanian–Wuchiapingian ?

Scientific classification
- Kingdom: Animalia
- Phylum: Chordata
- Clade: Synapsida
- Clade: Therapsida
- Clade: †Anomodontia
- Clade: †Dicynodontia
- Clade: †Bidentalia
- Infraorder: †Dicynodontoidea
- Genus: †Kunpania; Sun, 1978
- Species: †K. scopulusa

Binomial name
- †Kunpania scopulusa Sun, 1978

Extinct genus of dicynodonts

Kunpania is an extinct genus of dicynodont therapsid from the Quanzijie Formation of Xinjiang, China. The type and only species is K. scopulusa, and it is known only by a single incomplete specimen including parts of the skull and forelimb. Since its initial description in 1978 by palaeontologist Ailing Sun, it has sometimes been considered to be another species of Dicynodon by other researchers, or potentially undiagnostic. However, a redescription in 2021 reaffirmed its distinctiveness, including a uniquely well developed muscle attachment on the humerus. Kunpania is perhaps the oldest known member of the derived dicynodont group Dicynodontoidea, potentially dating to the Middle Permian period during the Capitanian, and so may fill a knowledge gap in the history of dicynodont evolution.

== History of discovery ==
The fossil remains of Kunpania were collected from the uppermost layers of the Quanzijie Formation in the Bogda Mountains of Jimsar in Xinjiang, China. This discovery was notable, as the majority of dicynodont fossils from the Bogda Mountains come from the younger Guodikeng Formation above it, and indeed Kunpania was the only tetrapod known from the formation until the femur of a chroniosuchian was discovered in 2020. The precise age of these deposits is uncertain, although they are typically thought to be from the Capitanian age at the end of the Guadalupian (or Middle Permian) based on palynology, cyclostratigraphy and constrained radiometric dating in surrounding rock units. However, it is possible that the uppermost Quanzijie Formation dates to the Wuchiapingian in the Lopingian (Late Permian), albeit no younger than 254.22 million years old.

Kunpania was first described in 1978 by palaeontologist Ailing Sun from the type and only known specimen IVPP V4695. The specimen originally only consisted of a partial snout missing the tip, a broken lower jaw and part of the forelimb including the right scapula, coracoid plate and humerus. Additionally, a partial right clavicle and a piece of the left tibia with the same specimen number were later recovered from the Institute of Vertebrate Paleontology and Paleoanthropology collections that matched the preservation style of the holotype, and so likely belong to the same specimen. In 1998 and 2001, palaeontologist Spencer G. Lucas synonymised Kunpania into Dicynodon as a distinct species, D. scopulusa, though he later considered the species to be dubious (a nomen dubium) in 2005. The species was again considered valid by Jörg Fröbisch in 2009, who again regarded it as a species of Dicynodon. In their 2011 revision of the taxonomy of Dicynodon, palaeontologists Christian Kammerer, Kenneth Angielczyk, and Fröbisch tentatively concluded that 'D.' scopulusa may be a valid taxon, but that its status was ultimately uncertain owing to its incompleteness.

Kunpania was fully redescribed in 2021 by Angielczyk, Jun Liu and Wan Yang, including further preparation of the underside of the skull that revealed additional features. Angielczyk and colleagues concluded that Kunpania was indeed a wholly distinct genus and species of dicynodont based on a unique combination of physical traits and comparisons with other dicynodonts.

== Description ==
=== Skull and jaws ===
Kunpania was a relatively large dicynodont, with a preserved basal skull length of 307 millimetres (12.1 in) and an estimated complete basal length of 442 millimetres (17.4 in) based on Daptocephalus. Like other bidentalian dicynodonts, Kunpania had no teeth and a beak except for two tusks in the upper jaws. The tusks themselves are mostly missing in the only known specimen, but the caniniform processes that housed them are angled strongly forwards, and so the tusks sat ahead of the eyes on the snout. Although the very tip is missing, the preserved shape of the snout suggests that the beak was rounded-off and somewhat hooked. Likewise, the top surface of the skull is damaged, so it is unknown if Kunpania possessed nasal bosses like some other dicynodonts.

The secondary palate on the roof of the mouth, composed of the premaxillary bones, is unusually smooth in Kunpania, with only a single midline ridge at the back. The crista oseophagea, a bony process of the pterygoid on the roof of the mouth, is unusually robust and blocky, unlike the blade-like structure more typical of bidentalians and more like those of more primitive dicynodonts.

The mandible resembles those of other dicynodonts, with a squared-off beak that is upturned at the tip. The lateral dentary shelf, a site for jaw muscle attachment, is well developed and overhangs the mandibular fenestra. The shelf is unusually thick compared to other dicynodontoids, and is angled outwards in a triangular shape from above, more similar to its shape in the unrelated Dicynodontoides (a non-dicynodontoid dicynodont). Just behind the mandibular fenestra, there is an unusual backwards-curving ridge on the angular bone. This ridge sits where the reflected lamina (a bony structure potentially used in hearing) usually attaches in other dicynodonts, however they are usually attached by a vertical ridge, unlike the horizontally curving structure in Kulpania. The reflected lamina may then have been unusually shaped.

=== Postcrania ===
The scapular is robust, with a glenoid (shoulder socket) that faced back and out to the sides in life. The humerus of the upper arm possesses a pointed triangular process jutting from the back side of the bone, likely the attachment point for the latissimus dorsi muscle. In all other dicynodonts this process is usually low and flattened, and so the exaggerated size of this process may indicate a specialised function of the forelimbs in Kunpania. The head of the humerus may also suggest a specialisation, as it is notably narrower than is typical for dicynodonts.

== Classification ==
Kunpania was originally classified as a member of the family Dicynodontidae by Sun in 1978, and later as a species of Dicynodon itself by later authors. Kunpania would not be included in a phylogenetic analysis until its redescription in 2021, where it was found to be an early diverging member of the clade Dicynodontoidea and most closely related to the South African genus Sintocephalus.

The cladogram produced by Angielczyk et al. (2021) is reproduced and simplified below:

- Dicynodontoidea
  - Basilodon
  - - - Sintocephalus
      - Kunpania
    - - Euptychognathus
      - - - Gordonia
          - Jimusaria
        - - - - Syops
              - Lystrosaurus
            - - - Peramodon
                - - Daptocephalus
                  - - Dinanomodon
                    - Turfanodon
              - - Dicynodon
                - - Delectosaurus
                  - - Vivaxosaurus
                    - - Taoheodon
                      - - Counillonia
                        - Repelinosaurus
          - Kannemeyeriiformes

Kunpania is diagnosed by the absence of ridges on the palate at the front of the mouth, a robust and block-like crista oseophagea, a prominent and thick lateral dentary shelf on the lower jaw, a small backwards-curving projection of the angular bone, and the large, triangular shaped attachment for the latissimus dorsi on the humerus.

=== Evolution of Bidentalia ===
As an early dicynodontoid, Kunpania could reveal information about the evolution and radiation of bidentalian dicynodonts. If the Capitanian age is correct, it would indicate that bidentalian dicynodonts had radiated earlier than the fossil record indicates, before the Capitanian mass extinction event, and that the early history of bidentalians is otherwise unknown in the fossil record. It would also create extensive ghost lineages amongst bidentalians, including for the three traditional lineages of cryptodonts, 'elphids', and at least three lineages of dicynodontoids.

Alternatively, an early to middle Wuchiapingian age would be more consistent with the known record of bidentalian dicynodonts, being a contemporary of early cryptodonts and still the oldest known dicynodontoid. The latter is also in keeping with its relatively basal phylogenetic position and would fill the ghost lineage between derived dicynodontoids and cryptodonts. This scenario would suggest bidentalians originated before the end-Capitanian extinction but only radiated afterwards, rapidly spreading across Pangaea to Laurasia and Gondwana. A third hypothesis, that Kunpania is mid-late Wuchiapingian in age, would result in no change to the known pattern of bidentalian evolution. It would also require that the age of the upper Quanzijie Formation to be significantly underestimated and drastically shorten the period of time between it and the overlying Guodikeng Formation.

== Palaeoecology ==
Paleosols (fossilised soils) from the uppermost Quanzijie Formation are mostly of water-logged gleysols, indicating a wet humid to subhumid climate. The only other known tetrapod contemporary with Kunpania is an indeterminate chroniosuchian, a semi-aquatic predatory reptiliomorph.
