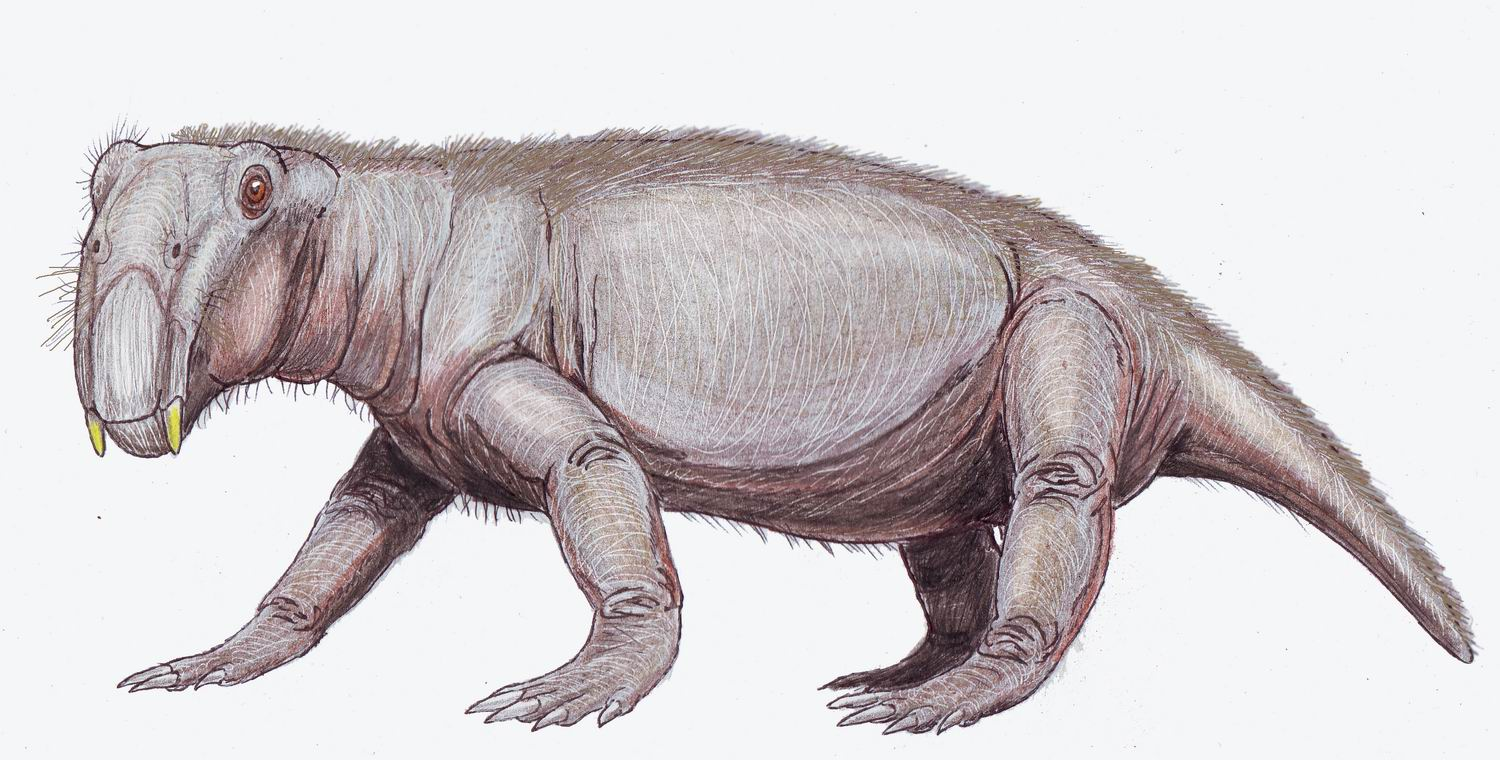
- Life restoration of Lystrosaurus georgi

Scientific classification
- Kingdom: Animalia
- Phylum: Chordata
- Clade: Synapsida
- Clade: Therapsida
- Clade: †Anomodontia
- Clade: †Dicynodontia
- Infraorder: †Dicynodontoidea
- Family: †Lystrosauridae; Broom, 1903

Genera
- †?Basilodon Kammerer et al. 2011; †?Jimusaria Sun, 1963; †Euptychognathus Kammerer et al. 2011; †Kwazulusaurus Maicsh, 2002; †Lystrosauravus Kammerer et al., 2025; †Lystrosaurus (type) Cope, 1870; †Madumabisa Kammerer et al., 2025; †?Sintocephalus Van Hoepen, 1934; †?Syops Kammerer et al. 2011

= Lystrosauridae =

Lystrosauridae Temporal range: Late Permian-Early Triassic, 259–248 Ma

Extinct family of dicynodonts

Lystrosauridae is a family of dicynodont therapsids from the Permian and Triassic time periods. It includes at least four genera, Lystrosaurus, Lystrosauravus, Madumabisa and Euptychognathus. The former genus Kwazulusaurus with the single species K. shakai, from the Late Permian of South Africa, has been reinterpreted as a synonym of Lystrosaurus. The earliest known members of the family are known from the Late Permian of southern Africa, with Lystrosaurus expanding globally in the aftermath of the Permian-Triassic extinction in the Early Triassic.

Cladogram after Kammerer et al. 2025:

- Dicynodontoidea
  - Taoheodon
  - - - Repelinosaurus
      - Counillonia
    - - Dicynodon
      - - - Delectosaurus
          - Vivaxosaurus
        - - Lystrosauridae
            - - Lystrosaurus
              - Lystrosauravus
            - - Madumabisa
              - Euptychognathus
          - - - Basilodon
              - Sintocephalus
            - - - Syops
                - - Jimusaria
                  - - Gordonia
                    - Keyseria
              - - Kannemeyeriiformes
                - - Peramodon
                  - - Daptocephalus
                    - - Dinanomodon
                      - Turfanodon
