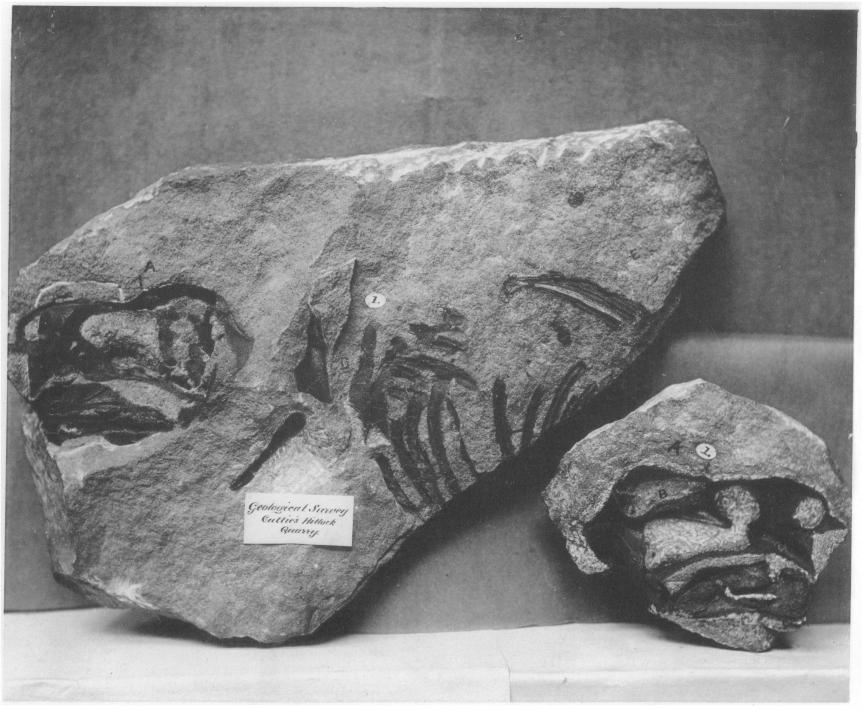
- Cast of the holotype skeleton of Gordonia traquairi

Scientific classification
- Kingdom: Animalia
- Phylum: Chordata
- Clade: Synapsida
- Clade: Therapsida
- Clade: †Anomodontia
- Clade: †Dicynodontia
- Infraorder: †Dicynodontoidea
- Genus: †Gordonia; Newton, 1893

Type species
- †G. traquairi Newton, 1893

Synonyms
- G. duffiana Newton, 1893; G. huxleyana Newton, 1893; G. juddiana Newton, 1893

= Gordonia (synapsid) =

Gordonia Temporal range: Late Permian

Extinct genus of dicynodonts

Gordonia is an extinct genus of dicynodont therapsid from the Late Permian of Scotland. Fossils have been found from the Elgin sandstone of Cutties Hillock Sandstone in Elgin, Moray. These are among the many amniote fossils referred to as the Elgin Reptiles. Gordonia was named in 1893 with four species: G. traquairi, G. duffiana, G. huxleyana, and G. juddiana. Currently, the only recognized species is the type G. traquairi. All other species are considered synonyms of the type.

== Description ==
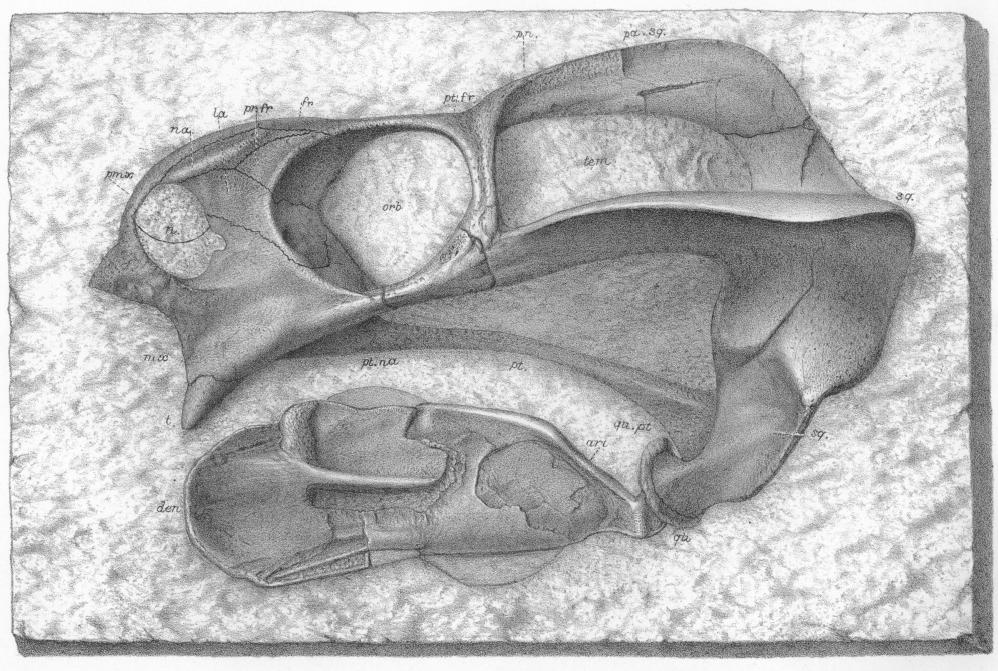
Illustration of the skull of Gordonia traquairi, 1893

Gordonia is known from several skulls and partial skeletons. It is small-bodied in comparison to other dicynodonts. It is distinguished by the rod-like shape of a ridge on its lower jaw called the lateral dentary shelf. Gordonia has a short snout with tusks that are angled slightly forward. The intertemporal region at the top of the skull is long and narrow and forms a raised sagittal crest. A long intertemporal region is usually associated with larger dicynodonts, making the skull proportions of Gordonia unusual. The endocast of Gordonia displays an enlarged pineal body, a feature likely linked to the enlargement of the sagittal crest.

== History ==
Fossils of Gordonia were first found by Scottish naturalist Ramsay Heatley Traquair in 1885, who immediately identified them as belonging to a dicynodont. They included several partial skeletons and complete skulls. All of these remains were preserved as impressions in sandstone, and no fossilized bones were found. On the basis of these impressions, E. T. Newton named Gordonia in 1893. Gordonia was named alongside a similar dicynodont, Geikia, and the small parareptile Elginia. Newton named four species of Gordonia, including G. traquairi (named after Traquair), G. duffiana, G. huxleyana (named after Thomas Henry Huxley), and G. juddiana.

In 1922, Russian paleontologist Vladimir Prokhorovich Amalitskii named two more species of Gordonia, G. annae and G. rossica. In 1926, G. annae and G. rossica were distinguished from the other species of Gordonia and transferred to the genus Dicynodon. Both species are now considered synonyms of Vivaxosaurus trautscholdi.

In 1988, British paleontologist Gillian King synonymized all species of Gordonia with Dicynodon, creating the single species Dicynodon traquairi. This classification was widely accepted in the following years. In 2011, a phylogenetic analysis of Dicynodon species found D. traquairi to be only distantly related to other species. The name Gordonia was reinstated, although only one species, G. traquairi, was recognized.

== Classification ==
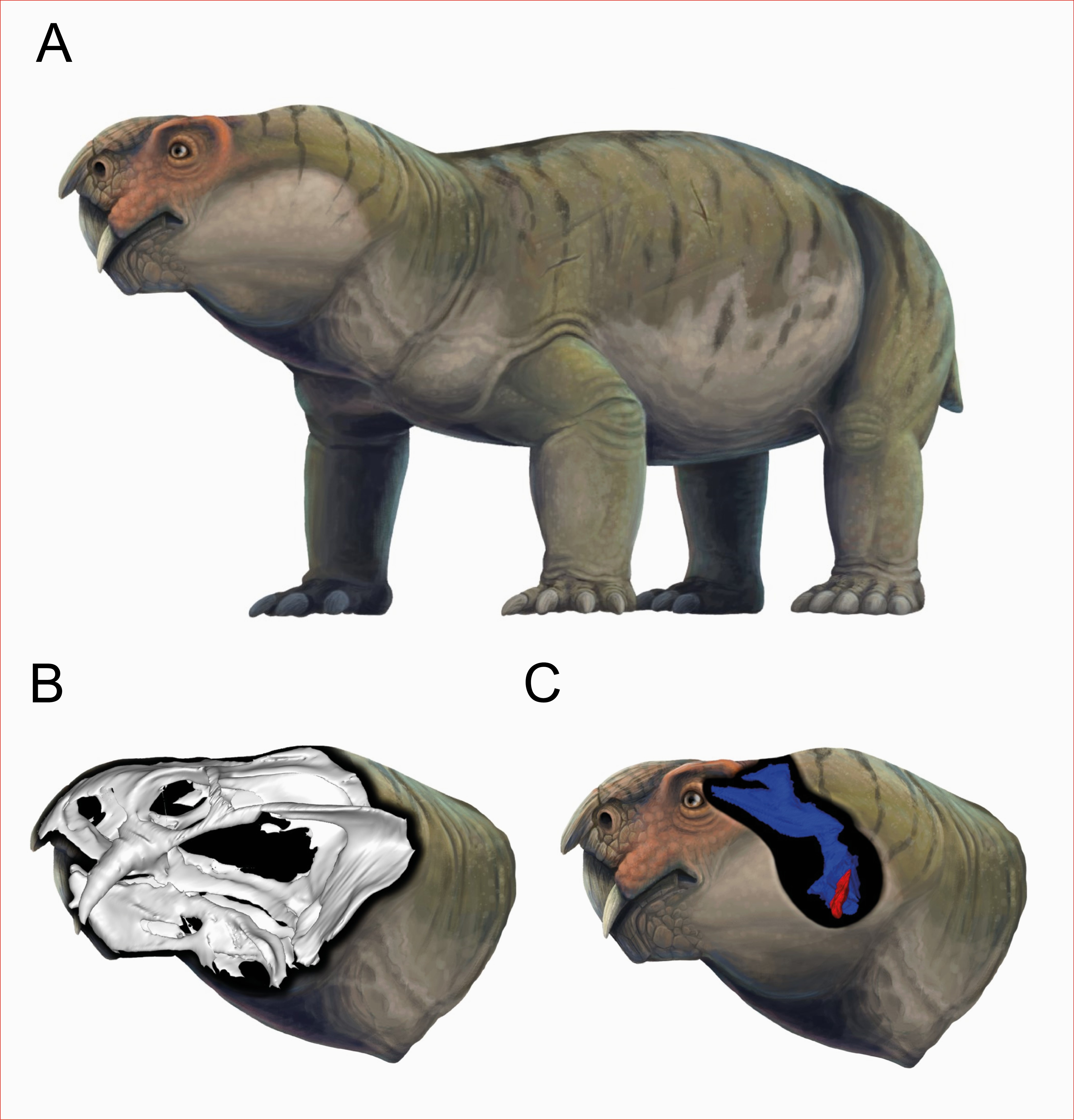
Life reconstruction of Gordonia traquairi

Below is a cladogram showing the phylogenetic placement of Gordonia from Kammerer et al. (2025):

- Dicynodontoidea
  - Taoheodon
  - - - Repelinosaurus
      - Counillonia
    - - Dicynodon
      - - - Delectosaurus
          - Vivaxosaurus
        - - Lystrosauridae
            - - Lystrosaurus
              - Lystrosauravus
            - - Madumabisa
              - Euptychognathus
          - - - Basilodon
              - Sintocephalus
            - - - Syops
                - - Jimusaria
                  - - Gordonia
                    - Keyseria
              - - Kannemeyeriiformes
                - - Peramodon
                  - - Daptocephalus
                    - - Dinanomodon
                      - Turfanodon
