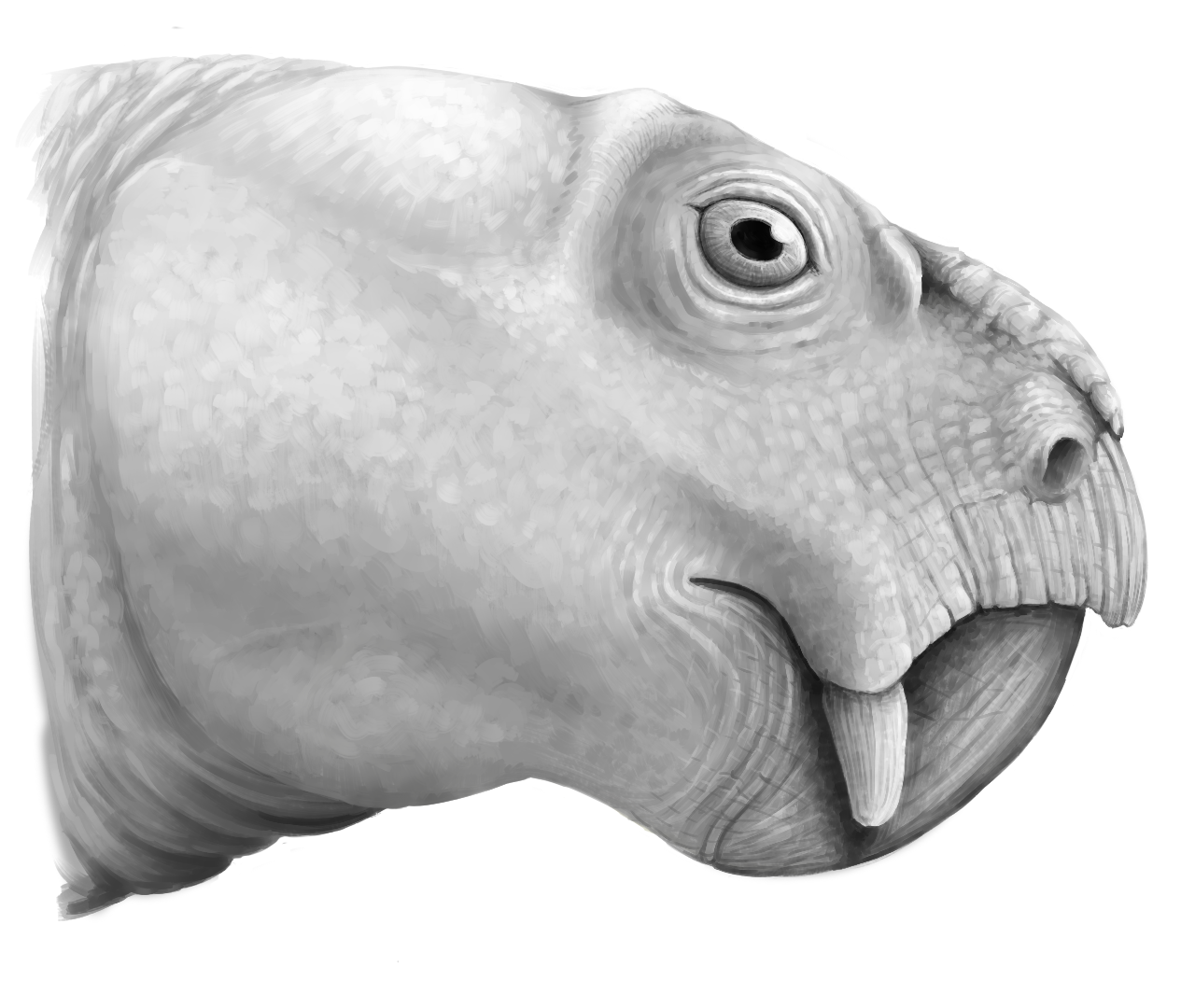
- Life restoration of Counillonia

Scientific classification
- Kingdom: Animalia
- Phylum: Chordata
- Clade: Synapsida
- Clade: Therapsida
- Clade: †Anomodontia
- Clade: †Dicynodontia
- Infraorder: †Dicynodontoidea
- Genus: †Counillonia; Olivier et al., 2019
- Species: †C. superoculis

Binomial name
- †Counillonia superoculis Olivier et al., 2019

= Counillonia =

Counillonia Temporal range: Late Permian or Early Triassic ~251 Ma

Extinct genus of dicynodonts

Counillonia is an extinct genus of dicynodont therapsid from the area of Luang Prabang in Laos, Southeast Asia that lived at around the time of the Permian-Triassic boundary and possibly dates to the earliest Early Triassic. Its type and only known species is C. superoculis. Counillonia was related to the Triassic dicynodonts such as Lystrosaurus and the Kannemeyeriiformes that survived the Permian mass extinction, but it was more closely related to the Permian genus Dicynodon than to either of these lineages. Counillonia may then possibly represent another line of dicynodonts that survived the Permian mass extinction into the Triassic period, depending on its age. The discovery of Counillonia in Laos and its unexpected evolutionary relationships hint at the less well understood geographies of dicynodont diversity across the Permo-Triassic boundary outside of well explored regions like the Karoo Basin in South Africa.

== Description ==
Counillonia was a medium-sized dicynodont (skull length of 16 centimetres (6.3 in)) currently known only from a single skull that's missing the lower jaws. However, it likely resembled other closely related dicynodonts, particularly Dicynodon itself, and so was probably a squat, sprawling quadruped with a short tail and a large head with nearly toothless jaws and a tortoise-like beak, sporting a pair of prominent tusks.

=== Skull ===
The skull of Counillonia is short and relatively slender in construction, with the typically broad temporal fenestra of most dicynodonts at the back (although they are relatively reduced for a dicynodont) and a short, narrow snout that comes to a squared-off beak tip. The caniniform process of the maxilla is short and directed anteriorly so that the tusks point somewhat forward as well as down, and sits entirely in front of the eyes. The upper jaw is completely toothless apart from these two tusks. The interorbital region between the eyes is narrow, and so the large orbits are characteristically directed upwards. The nostrils are large, occupying approximately 1/3 of the snout's surface, and sit low at the front of the snout above the short and fused premaxillae. The nasal bones near the front of the snout sport a single well-developed boss that sits almost right above the nostrils and the premaxilla. This boss is bordered on each side by wide, elongate depressions that extend up on to the frontal bones behind the nasals. The boss has a roughened, rugose texture, but the surface of the rest of the snout is too weathered to determine if they were similarly rugose.

Contacts between the bones are difficult to discern, and sutures are hardly visible on the surface of the skull, mostly between the contacts of the frontals and the surrounding bones. The pineal foramen (the opening for the "third eye") is oval and lies across the parietal bones just behind the preparietal and is positioned relatively far back in the last quarter of the skull. The braincase and rear of the skull is somewhat weathered, but they appear similarly constructed to those of other dicynodonts. The secondary palate formed by the premaxilla is unusually short and reduced, and their contact with the palatine bones is not visible. The palatines themselves preserve expanded, roughly textured pads that indicate the front of the roof of the mouth was covered in keratinous horn like the beak.

== History of discovery ==
The holotype and only specimen of Counillonia was discovered in the Purple Claystone Formation of the Luang Prabang Basin in northern Laos. This sedimentary unit mostly consists of purple silty-claystones mixed with layers of conglomerates and sandstone, as well as volcaniclastic sediments. Estimated dates for the age of the formation have ranged from the Late Permian to the Late Triassic or even the earliest Jurassic period. More recently, radiometric dating using U—Pb geochronology from detrital zircon has yielded a maximum age for deposition of 251.0 ± 1.4 Ma. It has been further suggested that mixing and reworking of the sediments implies that the actual depositional age of the formation is possibly even younger than this date, and so likely placing it in the Early Triassic.

However, the reliability of this date was contested by Jun Liu in 2020, who argued that based on biostratigraphy the Purple Claystone Formation should instead be regarded as Late Permian in age, comparing Counillonia to dicynodonts found in the 255-253 million year old Daptocephalus Assemblage Zone of South Africa. Furthermore, Liu argued that the conditions of the Permian mass extinction in equatorial regions between the palaeolatitudes where Laos was situated (such as high temperatures over 40 °C) would have been inhospitable for dicynodonts, and concluded that Counillonia instead likely pre-dates the extinction event for these reasons.

The first dicynodont remains to be discovered in the Purple Claystone Formation was a single, poorly preserved partial skull discussed by French geologist Jean-Baptiste-Henri Counillon in 1896. This skull was described in 1923 by another French geologist, Joseph Répelin, who named it as a new species of Dicynodon, "Dicynodon incisivum". The incomplete and damaged nature of the skull made identification difficult, and it has been variously attributed to Dicynodon and Lystrosaurus due to a supposed resemblance to the latter. The specimen has since been lost, and the poor quality of the remaining illustrations of the skull are unsuitable for supporting the validity of the species, and "D. incisivum" has since been considered a nomen dubium. As such, its relationships to other Purple Claystone dicynodonts like Counillonia remain unknown, despite the similarities the lost skull of "D. incisivum" and the type of Counillonia share with Dicynodon.

More dicynodont remains were recovered by a Franco-Laotian expedition between 1993 and 2003 led by palaeontologist Philippe Taquet. Three skulls in particular were studied and briefly described in 2009 and were assigned to Dicynodon, tentatively as a new species, although this relationship was not tested and remained uncertain. In 2019, the three skulls were more described in full detail and were recognised as representing two distinct new taxa, one of which, specimen LPB 1993–3, is the holotype for Counillonia. The other two skulls were assigned to another new genus, Repelinosaurus. The holotype was temporarily stored, prepared and studied at the Muséum National d'Histoire Naturelle in Paris, and is permanently housed at the Savannakhet Dinosaur Museum in Laos.

LPB 1993-3 is relatively complete, although the left portion of the orbit is damaged and it is missing the stapes and quadrate bones, as well as poorly preserving the preparietal, prootic and epipterygoid bones. The top surfaces of the snout and head are also partly weathered and eroded. The genus was named in honour of the geologist Jean-Baptiste-Henri Conillon as the first person to recognise the presence of dicynodonts in Laos, while the species is from the Latin super (upward) and oculis (eyes) in reference to its upward-facing orbits.

== Classification ==
Preliminary studies of specimen LPB 1993-3 found it to be closely comparable to Dicynodon based on comparative anatomy. A phylogenetic analysis was later performed when Counillonia was officially described, utilising the dataset of Angielcyzk & Kammerer (2017), where Counillonia was found to be a "Dicynodon"-grade dicynodontoid forming a clade with Dicynodon and various other Dicynodon-like species. Amongst these similar species, Counillonia could be distinguished by three unique autapomorphies (derived traits): a relatively large median pterygoid plate, and a braincase with no intertuberal ridge on the basioccipital and distinct backwards-facing processes on the opisthotics. The occipital condyle that connects the skull with the spinal column is also unfused, a feature it only shares with Delectosaurus among the "Dicynodon"-grade taxa (in which they are otherwise fused). Counillonia also differs from its nearest phylogenetic and geographic relatives in various other combinations of features on the skull that further distinguish it from these other genera. Furthermore, despite not being found as particularly closely related to the existing valid species of Dicynodon, many of the genera within the "Dicynodon"-grade were formerly assigned to Dicynodon, and so the results of the phylogenetic analysis corroborate the initial identification.

A simplified cladogram, an excerpt from the full analysis by Olivier and colleagues focused on the relationships of the "Dicynodon"-grade dicynodontoids, is shown below:

- Dicynodontoidea
  - Rhachiocephalidae
  - - Odontocyclops
    - - Geikiidae
      - - Basilodon
        - - Syops
          - - Lystrosauridae
            - - Kannemeyeriiformes
                - Repelinosaurus
                - - Shansiodontidae
                  - - Stahleckeriidae
                    - Kannemeyeriidae
              - - Gordonia
                - - Dicynodon
                  - - - Vivaxosaurus
                      - Delectosaurus
                    - - - Jimusaria
                        - - Euptychognathus
                          - Sintocephalus
                      - - Counillonia
                        - - Daptocephalus
                          - - Peramodon
                            - - Turfanodon
                              - Dinanomodon

Unusually, their analysis recovered Counillonia and the other "Dicynodon"-grade taxa united as a clade sister to the Kannemeyeriiformes, and not as a grade of taxa leading up to Lystrosauridae and Kannemeyeriiformes, which are usually recovered as each other's sister taxa. In this analysis, Counillonia shares four synapomorphies with all the other members of this clade, and they all together share another two with the Kannemeyeriiformes.

Another analysis performed in 2020 by Jun Liu found Counillonia to be the sister taxon to the contemporary Laotian dicynodont Repelinosaurus, together forming a clade with the newly described Chinese dicynodont Taoheodon. Liu identified a 'core-Dicynodon' clade containing these taxa, Dicynodon itself, and the Russian genera Delectosaurus and Vivaxosaurus. A simplified excerpt of the cladogram produced by Liu (2020) is shown below:

- Dicynodontoidea
  - - Keyseria
    - Daqingshanodon
  - - - Sintocephalus
      - Basilodon
    - - Syops
      - - Euptychognathus
        - - - Lystrosaurus
            - - - Peramodon
                - - Daptocephalus
                  - - Dinanomodon
                    - Turfanodon
              - - Dicynodon
                - - Delectosaurus
                  - - Vivaxosaurus
                    - - Taoheodon
                      - - Counillonia
                        - Repelinosaurus
          - Kannemeyeriiformes

== Palaeoecology ==
In the Purple Clay Formation, Counillonia is currently only known to have co-existed with the basal kannemeyeriiform dicynodont Repelinosaurus and the semi-aquatic chroniosuchian tetrapod Laosuchus. The only direct evidence of plants in the formation are preserved root traces in palaeosols, but a locality underlying the Purple Claystone Formation and above late Changhsingian (Late Permian) deposits preserves a rich and diverse palaeoflora. The sediments preserved indicate that the Purple Clay Formation was deposited in a braided river environment that gradually transitioned to an alluvial plain with ponds. The region was volcanically active, as evidenced by the volcaniclastic rocks mixed in with the sediments of the formation. This appears to be associated with a volcanic arc that was formed as the then isolated Indochina Block where Laos was located approached the rest of the supercontinent Pangaea.

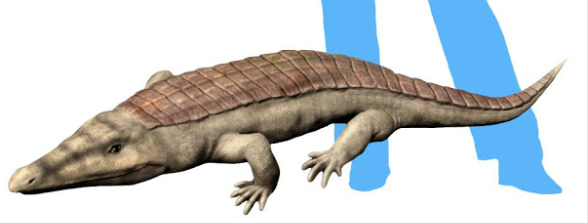
Life restoration of the contemporary chroniosuchian Laosuchus.

=== Palaeobiogeography ===
The presence of typical Permian fauna like Counillonia at a time close to the Permian mass extinction may suggest that the Indochina Block, including the Laos region, may have acted as a refugium for Permian life across the Permo-Triassic boundary (similarly, plant diversities in nearby South China appear to have been relatively stable across the Permo-Triassic boundary). This could also be supported by the absence of "Dicynodon"-grade dicynodonts like Counillonia in other parts of the world, such as in the Karoo Basin of South Africa where they appear to have disappeared entirely. This could reflect a potential bias in the geographic sampling of Permo-Triassic dicynodonts that may hinder our understanding of how they evolved, such as potential Triassic aged "Dicynodon"-grade dicynodonts like Counillonia.

Alternatively, if Counillonia is Late Permian in age, its presence in Laos would indicate that the Indochina Block was connected to the Southern and Northern China Blocks by this time. This is in contrast with previously inferred dates suggesting that these landmasses did not collide and connect with each other until the Triassic period.
