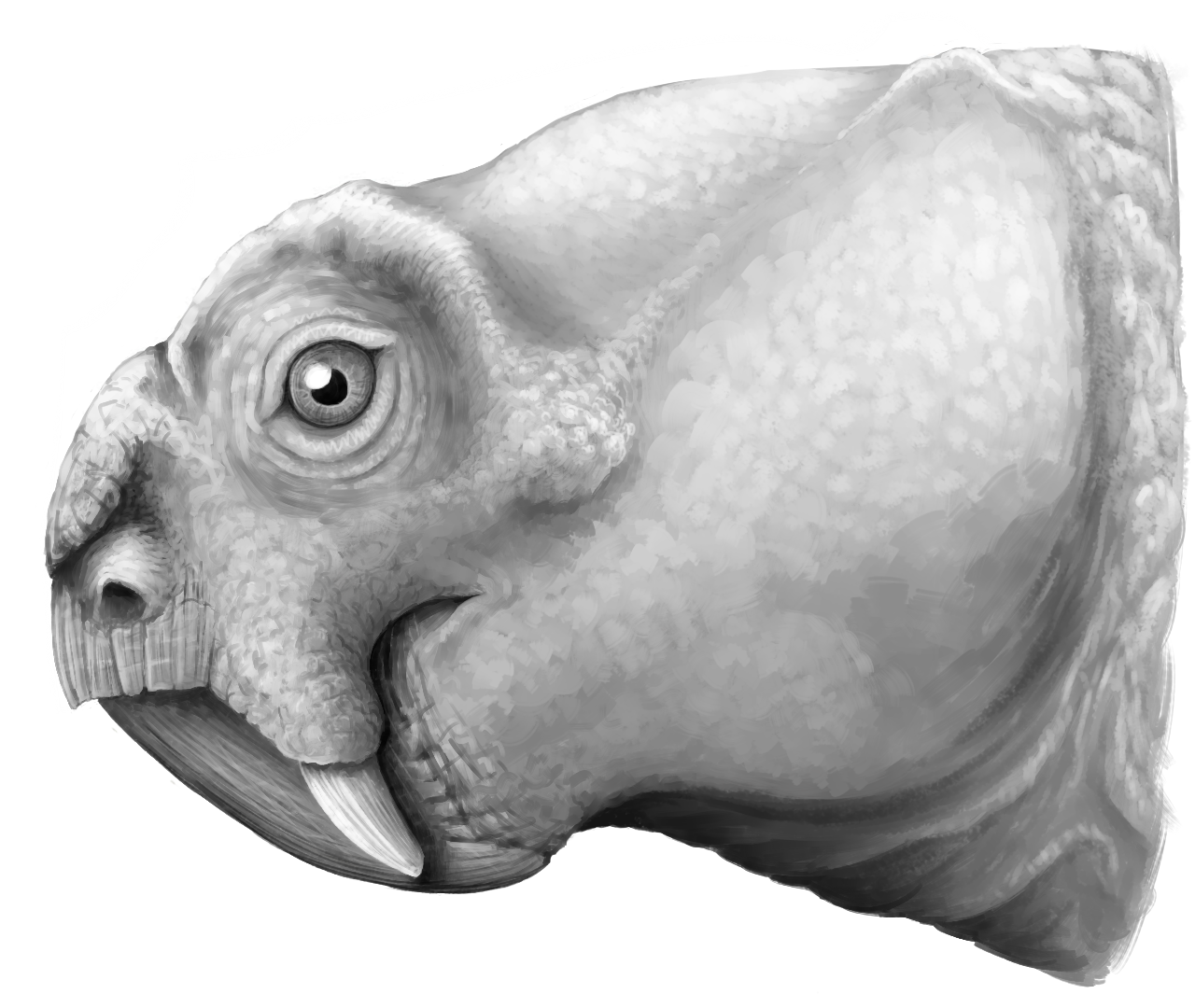
- Life restoration of Repelinosaurus

Scientific classification
- Kingdom: Animalia
- Phylum: Chordata
- Clade: Synapsida
- Clade: Therapsida
- Clade: †Anomodontia
- Clade: †Dicynodontia
- Infraorder: †Dicynodontoidea
- Genus: †Repelinosaurus; Olivier et al., 2019
- Species: †R. robustus

Binomial name
- †Repelinosaurus robustus Olivier et al., 2019

= Repelinosaurus =

Repelinosaurus Temporal range: Late Permian or Early Triassic ~251 Ma

Extinct genus of dicynodonts

Repelinosaurus is an extinct genus of dicynodont from the Purple Claystone Formation of Luang Prabang in Laos, Southeast Asia that lived at around the time of the Permian-Triassic boundary and possibly dates to the earliest Early Triassic. Its type and only known species is R. robustus. Repelinosaurus was originally described as the earliest known kannemeyeriiform dicynodont, supporting the idea of a more rapid radiation of the Triassic kannemeyeriiform dicynodonts during the Early Triassic following the Permian mass extinction. However, it may alternatively be more closely related to the Permian Dicynodon. The discovery of a potential early kannemeyeriiform in an understudied locality like Laos highlights the importance of such places in dicynodont research, which has been largely focused on historically important localities such as the Karoo Basin of South Africa.

== Description ==
Repelinosaurus was a medium-sized dicynodont (largest skull length of 19 centimetres (7.5 in)) currently known only from skulls missing lower jaws and the rest of the skeleton. However, it likely resembled other kannemeyeriiform dicynodonts, and so was probably a heavily built, stocky-limbed quadruped with a short tail and a large head with nearly toothless jaws and a tortoise-like beak, sporting a pair of prominent tusks.

=== Skull ===
The skull of Repelinosaurus is relatively narrow for a dicynodont, and the snout in front of the eyes is especially short—among the shortest of any dicynodont—but proportionately wide, tapering slightly to a flat, squared-off beak. The bony nostrils are large, and occupy half of the length of the short snout. The upper surfaces of the snout are strongly rugose, particularly on the premaxilla, and this textured surface ends abruptly at the contact of the nasal and frontal bones. Like other Kannemeyeriiformes, the nasals sport bony bosses, however uniquely they form as a single central swelling on the snout while most other Kannemeyeriiformes have a distinct pair. This boss stops just above the edge of the nostrils, separated from the frontals by a notch, although the prefrontal bones also sport their own smaller, weakly developed boss.

The rough texture of the snout implies it was covered with a layer of horny keratin, like the beak. The maxilla is robust, more so in one specimen than the other, in which the caniniform process housing the tusk is also more strongly developed. The caniniform process is vertical, and so the prominent tusks point directly downwards. The palatine bones are wide at the front and form rough, rugose pads on the roof of the mouth, also likely covered in keratinous horn. The frontals are wide, and so the eyes sit down on the side of the head and face outwards. The postorbital bars closing off the back of the orbits are short, and so the skull (and the temporal fenestra) appear relatively narrow from above for a dicynodont. The pineal foramen (the opening for the "third eye"), bordered by the preparietal in front and the elongated parietal bones behind, is oval and sits flat on the skull, and noticeably varies in size between the two known specimens (0.96 cm and 1.33 cm in length).

The two skulls differ in other ways, some of which appear to be related ontogeny, such as the larger skull being more robust, having a more prominent caniniform process and better developed ornamentation with nasal bosses that extend further out to the sides of the snout. These differences appear to be due to changes in ontogeny or sexual dimorphism, as has been observed in some other dicynodonts, but this cannot be confirmed for Repelinosaurus.

== History of discovery ==
Both specimens of Repelinosaurus were discovered in the Purple Claystone Formation of the Luang Prabang Basin in northern Laos. This sedimentary unit mostly consists of purple silty-claystones mixed with layers of conglomerates and sandstone, as well as volcaniclastic sediments. Estimated dates for the age of the formation have ranged from the Late Permian to the Late Triassic or even the earliest Jurassic period. More recently, radiometric dating using U—Pb geochronology from detrital zircon has yielded a maximum age for deposition of 251.0 ± 1.4 Ma. However, the mixing and reworking of the sediments implies that the actual depositional age of the formation is probably younger than this, likely placing it in the Early Triassic.

However, the reliability of this date was contested by Jun Liu in 2020, who argued that based on biostratigraphy the Purple Claystone Formation should instead be regarded as Late Permian in age, comparing Counillonia to dicynodonts found in the 255-253 million year old Daptocephalus Assemblage Zone of South Africa. Furthermore, Liu argued that the conditions of the Permian mass extinction in equatorial regions between the palaeolatitudes where Laos was situated (such as high temperatures over 40 °C) would have been inhospitable for dicynodonts, and concluded that Counillonia instead likely pre-dates the extinction event for these reasons.

The first dicynodont remains to be discovered in the Purple Claystone Formation was a single, poorly preserved partial skull discussed by French geologist Jean-Baptiste-Henri Counillon in 1896. This skull was described in 1923 by another French geologist, Joseph Répelin, who named it as a new species of Dicynodon, "Dicynodon incisivum". The incomplete and damaged nature of the skull made identification difficult, and it has been variously attributed to Dicynodon and Lystrosaurus due to a supposed resemblance to the latter. The specimen has since been lost, and the poor quality of the remaining illustrations of the skull are unsuitable for supporting the validity of the species, and "D. incisivum" has since been considered a nomen dubium. As such, its relationships to other Purple Claystone dicynodonts like Repelinosaurus remain unknown.

More dicynodont remains were recovered by a Franco-Laotian expedition between 1993 and 2003 led by palaeontologist Philippe Taquet. Three skulls in particular were studied and briefly described in 2009 and were assigned to Dicynodon, tentatively as a new species, although this relationship was not tested and remained uncertain. In 2019, the three skulls were more described in full detail and were recognised as representing two distinct new taxa. Two of these skulls, specimens LPB 1993-2 and LPB 1993–9, were assigned to the new genus Repelinosaurus. The third skull was assigned to another new genus, Counillonia. The specimens were temporarily stored, prepared and studied at the Muséum National d'Histoire Naturelle in Paris, and is permanently housed at the Savannakhet Dinosaur Museum in Laos.

The larger of the two specimens, LPB 1993–2, was made the holotype of Repelinosaurus. It is a partial skull missing portions from the left back side including the postorbital bar, the zygomatic arch, the quadratojugals, quadrate bones and part of the squamosal, as well as the external portion of the tusks and the stapes. The palate is also somewhat weathered in this specimen. The referred specimen LPB 1993-9 is smaller than the holotype (15.72 centimetres (6.19 in) long) and also more complete, however it has been subjected to taphonomic distortion during fossilisation that distorts some features. The skull has been laterally compressed, particularly distorting the shape of the zygomatic arches, obscuring details of the palate, twisting the tusks so that they curl inward, and altering the symmetry of the skull in general (although the left orbit appears to have maintained its shape). LBP 1993-9 is also missing the left quadratojugal and stapes, and the quadrates, while the right stapes and epipterygoids are poorly preserved. The genus was named in honour of the geologist Joseph Répelin who described the first remains of Laotian dicynodonts from the Purple Clay Formation ("D. incisivum"), with the Latinised Greek suffix saurus ("lizard"). The species name is from the Latin robustus, referring to the robust construction of the skull in this species.

== Classification ==
Preliminary studies of both LPB 1993-2 and LPB 1993-9 found them to be closely comparable to Dicynodon based on comparative anatomy. A phylogenetic analysis was later performed when Repelinosaurus was officially described, utilising the dataset of Angielcyzk & Kammerer (2017), where Repelinosaurus was found to be the basal-most member of Kannemeyeriiformes. Both specimens were included individually to test and re-affirm that they belonged to the same taxon. Repelinosaurus shares three autapomorphies (derived traits) with other Kannemeyeriiformes: the absence of a postfrontal bone, the ventral keels on the anterior pterygoid rami do not converge, and there is no intertuberal ridge on the basioccipital of the braincase. Compared to all other Kannemeyeriiformes, Repelinosaurus can be distinguished by its strongly reduced, short snout, as well as by only having a single median boss and not a pair as with other Kannemeyeriiformes. It also differs in lacking the characteristic temporal crest of many Kannemeyeriiformes, due to its dorsal-facing postorbital bars.

A simplified cladogram, an excerpt from the full analysis by Olivier and colleagues focused on the relationships of Kannemeyeriiformes, is shown below:

- (To Dicynodontoidea)
  - Lystrosauridae
  - - "Dicynodon"-grade dicynodonts
    - Kannemeyeriiformes
      - Repelinosaurus
      - - Shansiodontidae
          - Shansiodon
          - - Vinceria
            - - Rhinodicynodon
              - Tetragonias
        - - Stahleckeriidae
            - Dinodontosaurus
            - - Angonisaurus
              - - Placeriinae
                - Stahleckeriinae
          - Kannemeyeriidae
            - - Sinokannemeyeria
              - - Parakannemeyeria
                - Xiyukannemeyeria
            - - Shaanbeikannemeyeria
              - - Rhadiodromus
                - - - Uralokannemeyeria
                    - Rechnisaurus
                  - - Dolichuranus
                    - - - Rabidosaurus
                        - Kannemeyeria simocephalus
                      - - Wadiasaurus
                        - Kannemeyeria lophorhinus

However, an analysis performed in 2020 by Jun Liu found Repelinosaurus to not be a kannemeyeriiform at all, but instead as the sister taxon to the contemporary Laotian dicynodont Counillonia within the "Dicynodon"-grade of dicynodontoids. This sister relationship is identified by three synapomorphies; a relatively wide median pterygoid plate, distinct contributions of the exoccipital and basioccipital to the occipital condyle at the back of the skull, and the lateral edge of paroccipital process drawn into sharp, posteriorly directed process that is distinctly offset from the surface of the occipital plate. Furthermore, Liu identified a 'core-Dicynodon' clade containing the two Laotian taxa, the Chinese Taoheodon, the Russian genera Delectosaurus and Vivaxosaurus, and Dicynodon itself.

A simplified excerpt of the cladogram produced by Liu (2020) is shown below:

- Dicynodontoidea
  - - Keyseria
    - Daqingshanodon
  - - - Sintocephalus
      - Basilodon
    - - Syops
      - - Euptychognathus
        - - - Lystrosaurus
            - - - Peramodon
                - - Daptocephalus
                  - - Dinanomodon
                    - Turfanodon
              - - Dicynodon
                - - Delectosaurus
                  - - Vivaxosaurus
                    - - Taoheodon
                      - - Counillonia
                        - Repelinosaurus
          - Kannemeyeriiformes

== Palaeoecology ==
In the Purple Clay Formation, Repelinosaurus is currently only known to have co-existed with the "Dicynodon"-grade dicynodont Counillonia and the semi-aquatic chroniosuchian tetrapod Laosuchus. The only direct evidence of plants in the formation are preserved root traces in palaeosols, but a locality underlying the Purple Claystone Formation and above late Changhsingian (Late Permian) deposits preserves a rich and diverse palaeoflora. The sediments preserved indicate that the Purple Clay Formation was deposited in a braided river environment that gradually transitioned to an alluvial plain with ponds. The region was volcanically active, as evidenced by the volcaniclastic rocks mixed in with the sediments of the formation. This appears to be associated with a volcanic arc that was formed as the then isolated Indochina Block where Laos was located approached the rest of the supercontinent Pangaea.

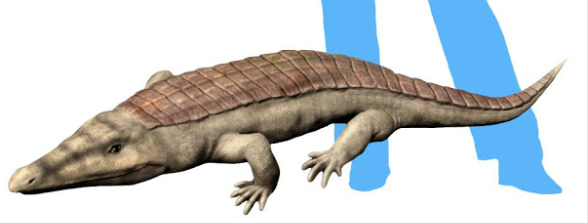
Life restoration of the contemporary chroniosuchian Laosuchus.

=== Palaeobiogeography ===
The presence of typical Permian fauna, including dicynodonts like Repelinosaurus, at a time close to the Permian mass extinction may suggest that the Indochina Block, including the Laos region, may have acted as a refugium for Permian life across the Permo-Triassic boundary (similarly, plant diversities in nearby South China appear to have been relatively stable across the Permo-Triassic boundary). Alternatively, if Repelinosaurus is Late Permian in age, its presence in Laos would indicate that the Indochina Block was connected to the Southern and Northern China Blocks by this time. This is in contrast with previously inferred dates suggesting that these landmasses did not collide and connect with each other until the Triassic period.

Repelinosaurus may represent one of the oldest known kannemeyeriiforms and would extend their range almost to the Permo-Triassic boundary itself. Kannemeyeriiforms were previously thought have to have only diversified by the Middle Triassic, however the discovery of Sungeodon from the Early Triassic of China suggested they were already radiating before then. The discovery of Repelinosaurus may support this, and could indicate that Kannemeyeriformes experienced a rapid post-extinction recovery almost immediately after the Permo-Triassic extinction. Furthermore, the presence of both Repelinosaurus and Sungeodon in Southeast Asia in the Early Triassic would strengthen suggestions that key parts of dicynodont evolution, namely the early evolution of the Kannemeyeriiformes, has been hindered by geographic sampling biases. Such biases have focused on well-studied historical sites, such as the Karoo Basin in South Africa, which despite heavily sampling have not recovered similar fossils. Events such as these may have taken place outside of such localities, as perhaps evidenced by the discovery of Repelinosaurus, a basal kannemeyeriiform, in Early Triassic Southeast Asia.
