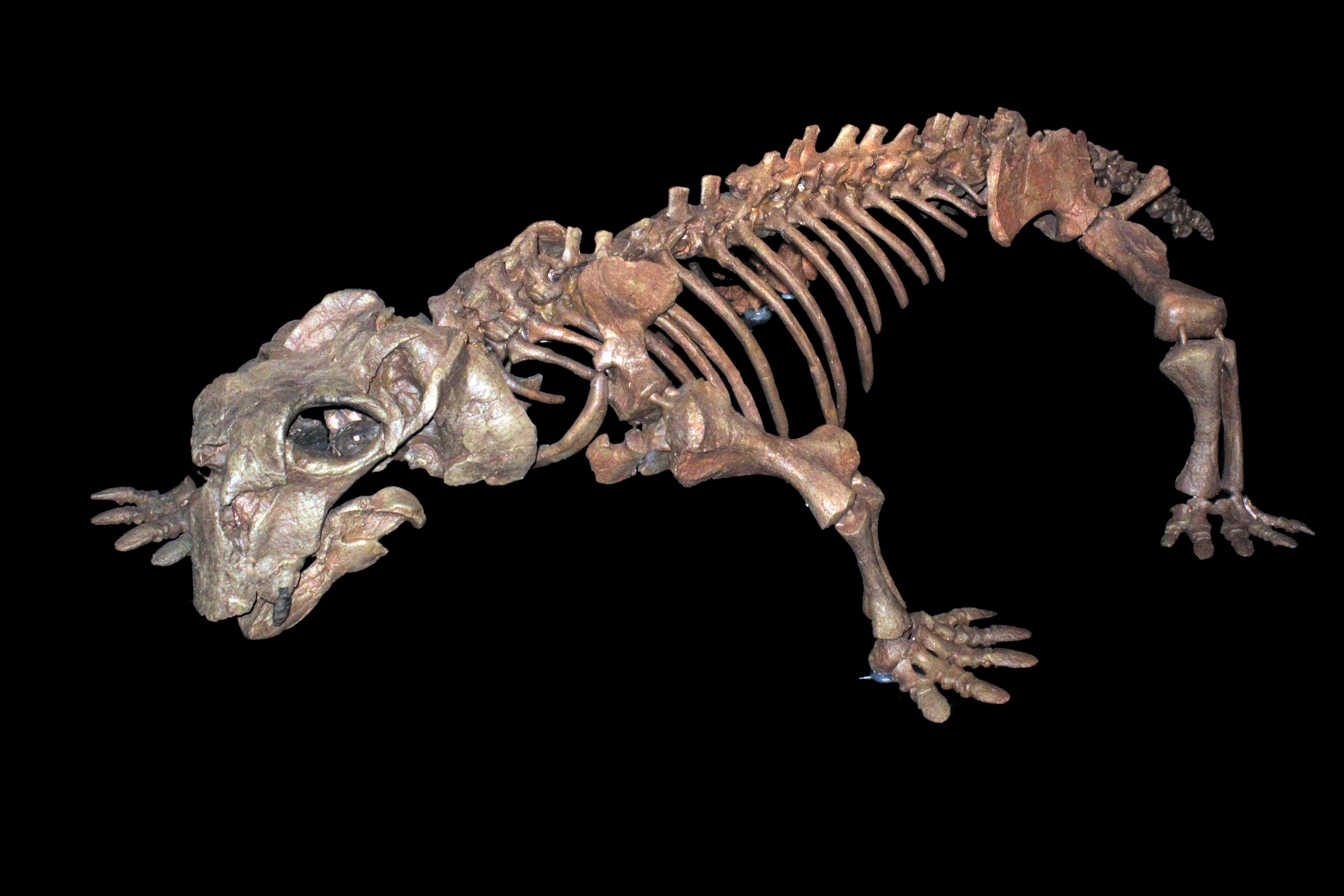
- L. hedini skeletal mount from the Natural history museum of Zürich

Scientific classification
- Kingdom: Animalia
- Phylum: Chordata
- Clade: Synapsida
- Clade: Therapsida
- Clade: †Anomodontia
- Clade: †Dicynodontia
- Family: †Lystrosauridae
- Genus: †Lystrosaurus; Cope, 1870

Species
- List: L. murrayi (Huxley, 1859) (type); L. declivis (Owen, 1860); L. curvatus (Owen, 1876); L. maccaigi Seeley, 1898

= Lystrosaurus =

Lystrosaurus Temporal range: Late Permian (Lopingian) – Early Triassic (Olenekian), 253.48–248 Ma

Genus of Late Permian and Early Triassic dicynodont therapsids

Lystrosaurus (/ˌlɪstroʊˈsɔːrəs/; 'shovel lizard'; from Ancient Greek λίστρον lístron 'tool for leveling or smoothing, shovel, spade, hoe') is an extinct genus of herbivorous dicynodont therapsids from the late Permian and Early Triassic epochs (around 248 million years ago). It had a widespread distribution across Pangaea, with fossils having been found in what is now Antarctica, India, China, Mongolia, European Russia, South Africa, and possibly Australia and Mozambique. Four to six species are currently recognized, but from the 1930s to 1970s the number of species was thought to be much higher.

As a dicynodont, Lystrosaurus had only two teeth (a pair of tusk-like canines), and is thought to have had a horny beak that was used for biting off pieces of vegetation. It was a heavily built, herbivorous animal. The structure of its shoulders and hip joints suggests that it moved with a semi-sprawling gait. Its forelimbs were even more robust than its hindlimbs, and it is thought to have been a powerful digger that nested in burrows.

Lystrosaurus was one of the few dicynodont lineages to survive the Permian-Triassic extinction event (Earth's most severe) 252 million years ago and thrived in the immediate aftermath; its fossils are, by far, the most common terrestrial vertebrate fossils in Early Triassic beds around the world, such as in the Lystrosaurus Assemblage Zone in South Africa. Researchers have offered various hypotheses for why it survived the extinction event and thrived in the early Triassic.

== History of discovery and taxonomy ==
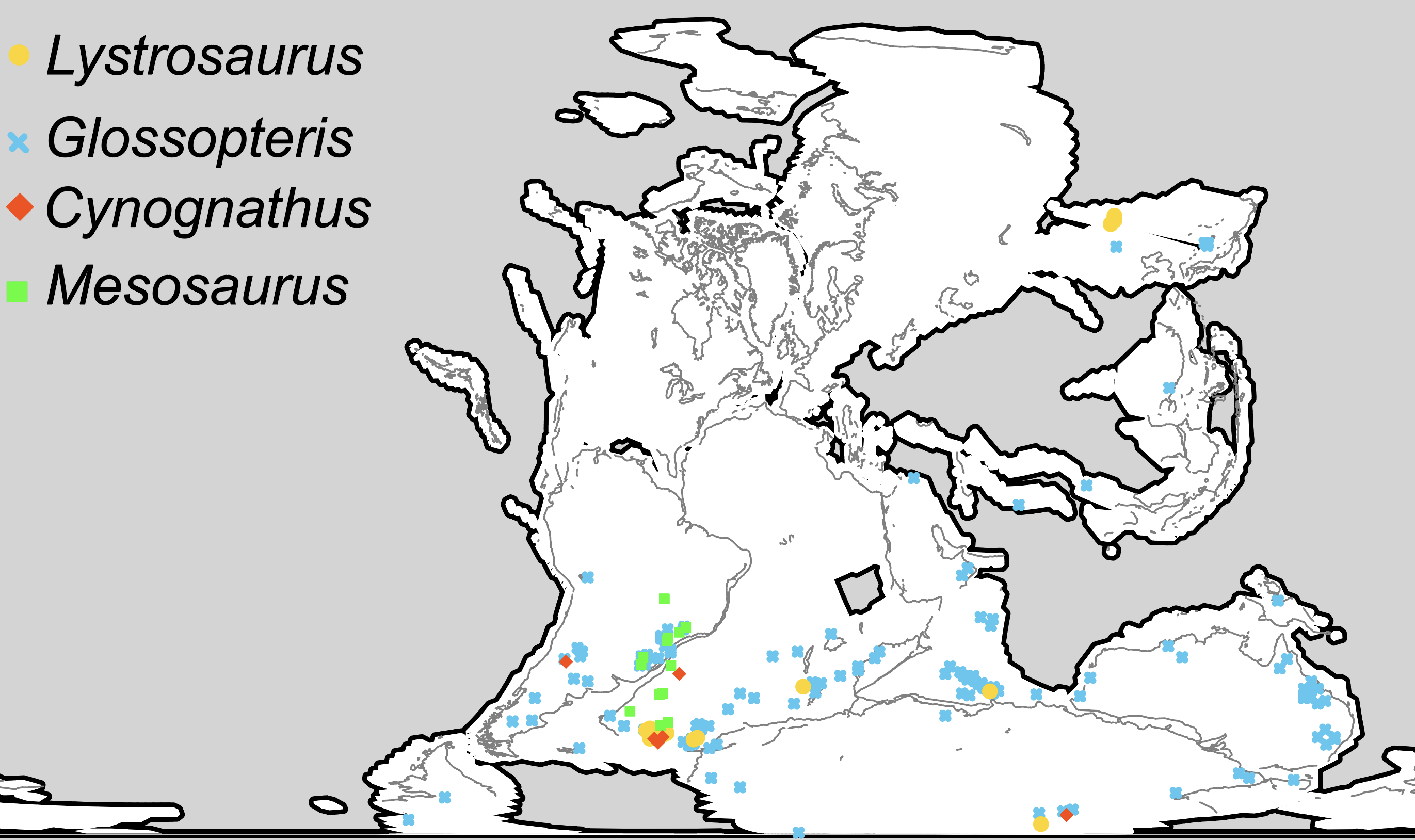
Map of Pangea showing locations of Lystrosaurus remains as yellow disks. Distorted boundaries of modern continents shown as grey lines. (Distributions for lystrosaurs and three other Permian and Triassic fossil groups used as biogeographic evidence for continental drift and certain land bridges.)

Dr. Elias Root Beadle, a Philadelphia missionary and avid fossil collector, discovered the first Lystrosaurus skull. He wrote about it to the eminent paleontologist Othniel Charles Marsh, but received no reply. Marsh's rival, Edward Drinker Cope, described and named it Lystrosaurus in the Proceedings of the American Philosophical Society in 1870. Its name is derived from the Ancient Greek words listron 'shovel' and sauros 'lizard'. Marsh purchased the skull in May 1871, although his interest in an already-described specimen was unclear; he may have wanted to scrutinize Cope's description and illustration.

=== Plate tectonics ===
The discovery of Lystrosaurus fossils at Coalsack Bluff in the Transantarctic Mountains by Edwin H. Colbert and his team in 1969–1970 helped support the hypothesis of plate tectonics and strengthen the theory, since Lystrosaurus had already been found in the lower Triassic of southern Africa as well as in India and China.

=== Distribution and species ===
Lystrosaurus fossils have been found in many Late Permian and Early Triassic terrestrial bone beds, most abundantly in Africa, and to a lesser extent in parts of what are now India, China, Mongolia, European Russia, and Antarctica (which was not over the South Pole at the time). Possible remains have also been reported from Australia and Mozambique. No Lystrosaurus fossils have been found in North and South America.

==== Species found in Africa ====
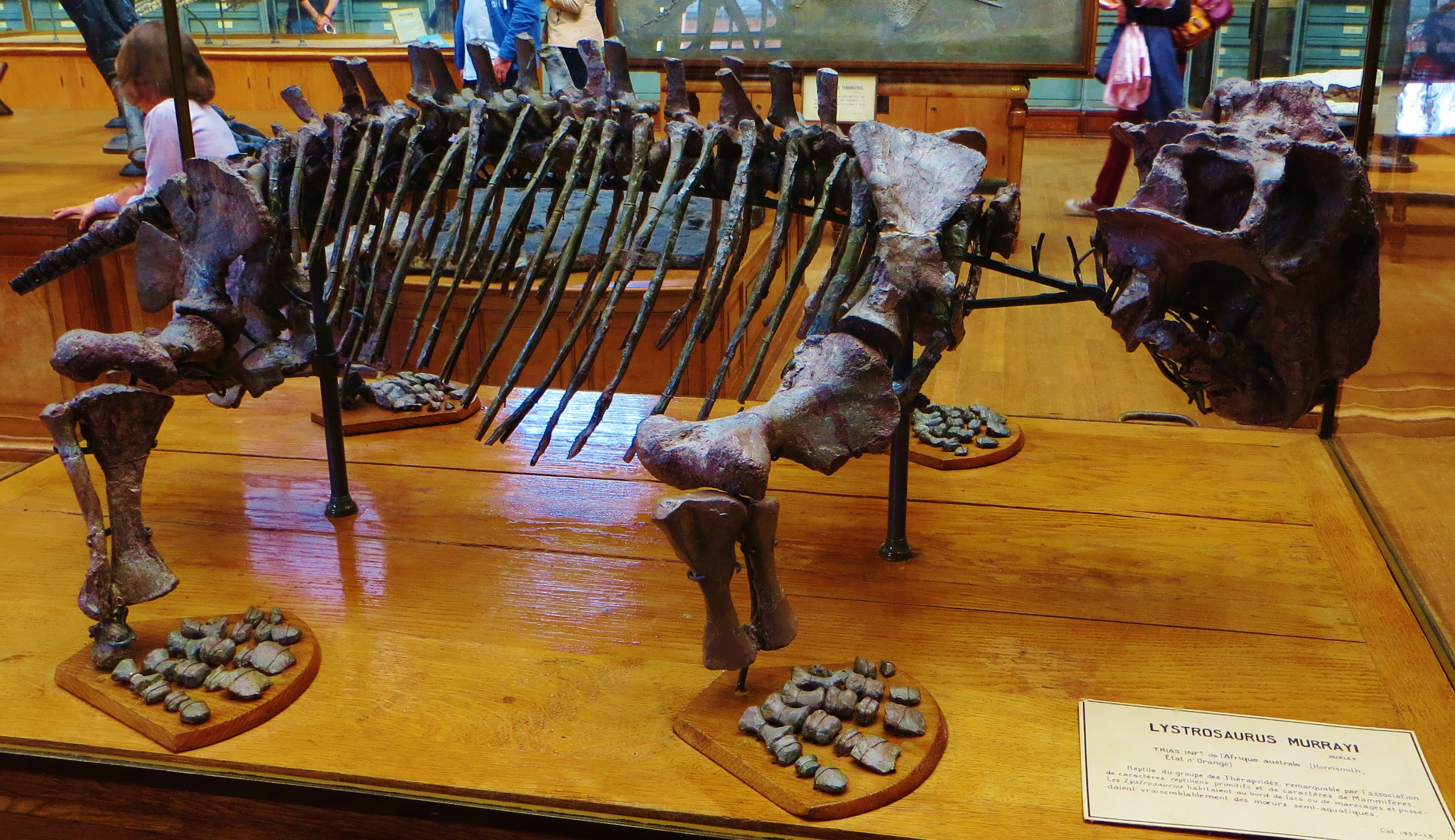
L. murrayi skeleton

Most Lystrosaurus fossils have been found in the Balfour and Katberg Formations (spanning the latest Permian Daptocephalus Assemblage Zone and earliest Triassic Lystrosaurus declivis Assemblage Zone) of the Karoo basin in South Africa; these specimens offer the best prospects of identifying species because they are the most numerous and have been studied for the longest time. As so often with fossils, paleontologists debate how many species have been found in the Karoo basin. Studies from the 1930s to 1970s suggested a large number (23 in one case). However, by the 1980s and 1990s, only 6 species were recognized in the Karoo: L. curvatus, L. platyceps, L. oviceps, L. maccaigi, L. murrayi, and L. declivis. A study in 2011 reduced that number to four, treating the fossils previously labeled as L. platyceps and L. oviceps as members of L. curvatus.

L. maccaigi is the largest and apparently most specialized species, while L. curvatus was the least specialized. A Lystrosaurus-like fossil, Kwazulusaurus shakai, has also been found in South Africa. Although not assigned to the same genus, it is very similar to L. curvatus. Some paleontologists have therefore proposed that it was possibly an ancestor of, or closely related to, the ancestors of L. curvatus, while L. maccaigi arose from a different lineage. L. maccaigi, found only in sediments from the Permian period, apparently did not survive the Permian–Triassic extinction event. Its specialized features and sudden appearance in the fossil record without an obvious ancestor may indicate that it immigrated into the Karoo from an area in which Late Permian sediments have not been found. L. curvatus, found in a narrow band of sediments from shortly before and after the extinction, can be used as an approximate marker for the boundary between the Permian and Triassic periods. A skull identified as L. curvatus has been found in late Permian sediments from Zambia. For many years, paleontologists thought no Permian specimens of L. curvatus existed in the Karoo—which led to suggestions that L. curvatus immigrated from Zambia into the Karoo. However, a reexamination of Permian specimens in the Karoo has identified some as L. curvatus, and there is no need to assume immigration.

L. murrayi and L. declivis are found only in Triassic sediments.

==== Other species ====
Lystrosaurus georgi fossils have been found in the Earliest Triassic sediments of the Moscow Basin in Russia. It was probably closely related to the African Lystrosaurus curvatus, which is regarded as one of the least specialized species and has been found in very Late Permian and very Early Triassic sediments.

L. murrayi, in addition to two undescribed species presently assigned to L. curvatus and L. declivis, is known from the Early Triassic Panchet Formation of the Damodar Valley and the Kamthi Formation of the Pranhita-Godavari Basin in India. Seven Lystrosaurus species have been described from the Early Triassic Jiucaiyuan, Guodikeng and Wutonggou formations of the Bogda Mountains in Xinjiang, China, although it is possible that only two (L. youngi and L. hedini) are valid; unusually, no Chinese Lystrosaurus specimens are known below the Permian-Triassic boundary in this region. L. curvatus, L. murrayi, and L. maccaigi are known from the Fremouw Formation in the Transantarctic Mountains of Antarctica.

=== Relationship to other dicynodonts ===
Lystrosaurus is placed within the family Lystrosauridae within the infraorder Dicynodontoidea. Cladogram after Kammerer et al. 2025:

- Dicynodontoidea
  - Taoheodon
  - - - Repelinosaurus
      - Counillonia
    - - Dicynodon
      - - - Delectosaurus
          - Vivaxosaurus
        - - Lystrosauridae
            - - Lystrosaurus
              - Lystrosauravus
            - - Madumabisa
              - Euptychognathus
          - - - Basilodon
              - Sintocephalus
            - - - Syops
                - - Jimusaria
                  - - Gordonia
                    - Keyseria
              - - Kannemeyeriiformes
                - - Peramodon
                  - - Daptocephalus
                    - - Dinanomodon
                      - Turfanodon

== Description ==
Size of Lystrosaurus murrayi compared to a human. Note that some other species, such as L. maccaigi, are known to have reached somewhat larger maximum sizes.

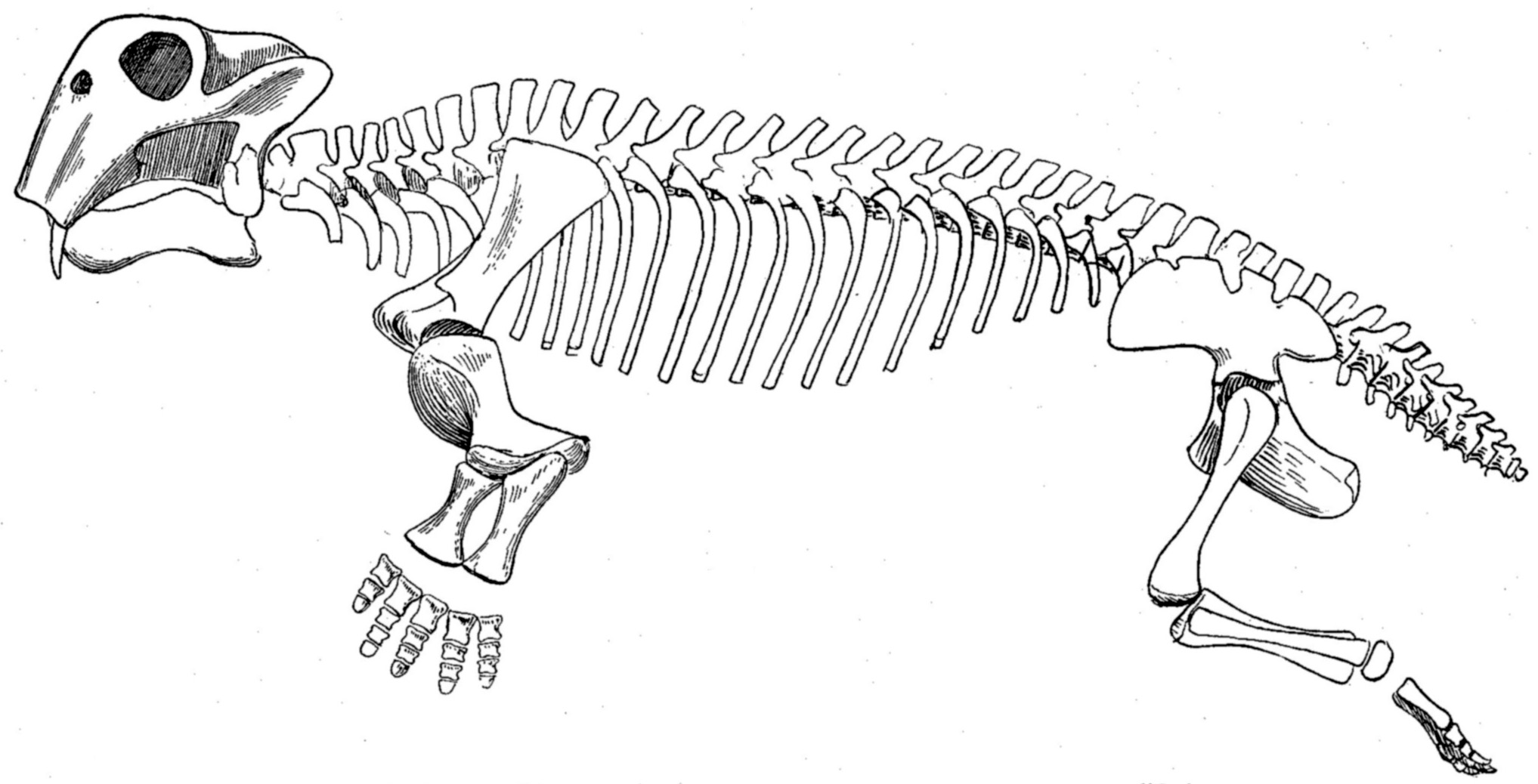
Lystrosaurus skeletal diagram

Lystrosaurus murrayi typically was about 50 cm (20 in) in total length, while Lystrosaurus declivis reached over 1 m (3.3 ft) in total length. The largest known individuals of the genus, belonging to the species L. maccaigi, reached a total skull length of around 27.8 cm (10.9 in).^{supplementary data} Specimens from the Northern Hemisphere tend to be larger than those found in the Southern Hemisphere, though this could be due to sampling bias, and individuals from both the Northern and Southern Hemisphere seem to have been capable of reaching the same maximum size.

Unlike other therapsids, dicynodonts had very short snouts and no teeth except for the tusk-like upper canines. Dicynodonts are generally thought to have had keratinous horny beaks like those of turtles, for shearing off pieces of vegetation, which were then ground on a horny secondary palate when the mouth was shut. The jaw joint was weak and moved backwards and forwards with a shearing action, instead of the more common sideways or up and down movements. It is thought that the jaw muscles were attached unusually far forward on the skull and took up a lot of space on the top and back of the skull. As a result, the eyes were set high and well forward on the skull, and the face was short.

Mummified foot of Lystrosaurus from the Karoo of South Africa, showing warty skin texture

Features of the skeleton indicate that Lystrosaurus moved with a semi-sprawling gait. The lower rear corner of the scapula (shoulder blade) was strongly ossified (built of strong bone), which suggests that movement of the scapula contributed to the stride length of the forelimbs and reduced the sideways flexing of the body. The five sacral vertebrae were massive but not fused to each other and to the pelvis, making the back more rigid and reducing sideways flexing while the animal was walking. Therapsids with fewer than five sacral vertebrae are thought to have had sprawling limbs, like those of modern lizards. In dinosaurs and mammals, which have erect limbs, the sacral vertebrae are fused to each other and to the pelvis. A buttress above each acetabulum (hip socket) is thought to have prevented dislocation of the femur (thigh bone) while Lystrosaurus was walking with a semi-sprawling gait. The forelimbs of Lystrosaurus were massive.

Mummified specimens recovered from the Karoo Basin and described in 2022 revealed that Lystrosaurus had dimpled, leathery, and hairless skin.

== Paleobiology ==
=== Reproduction and growth ===
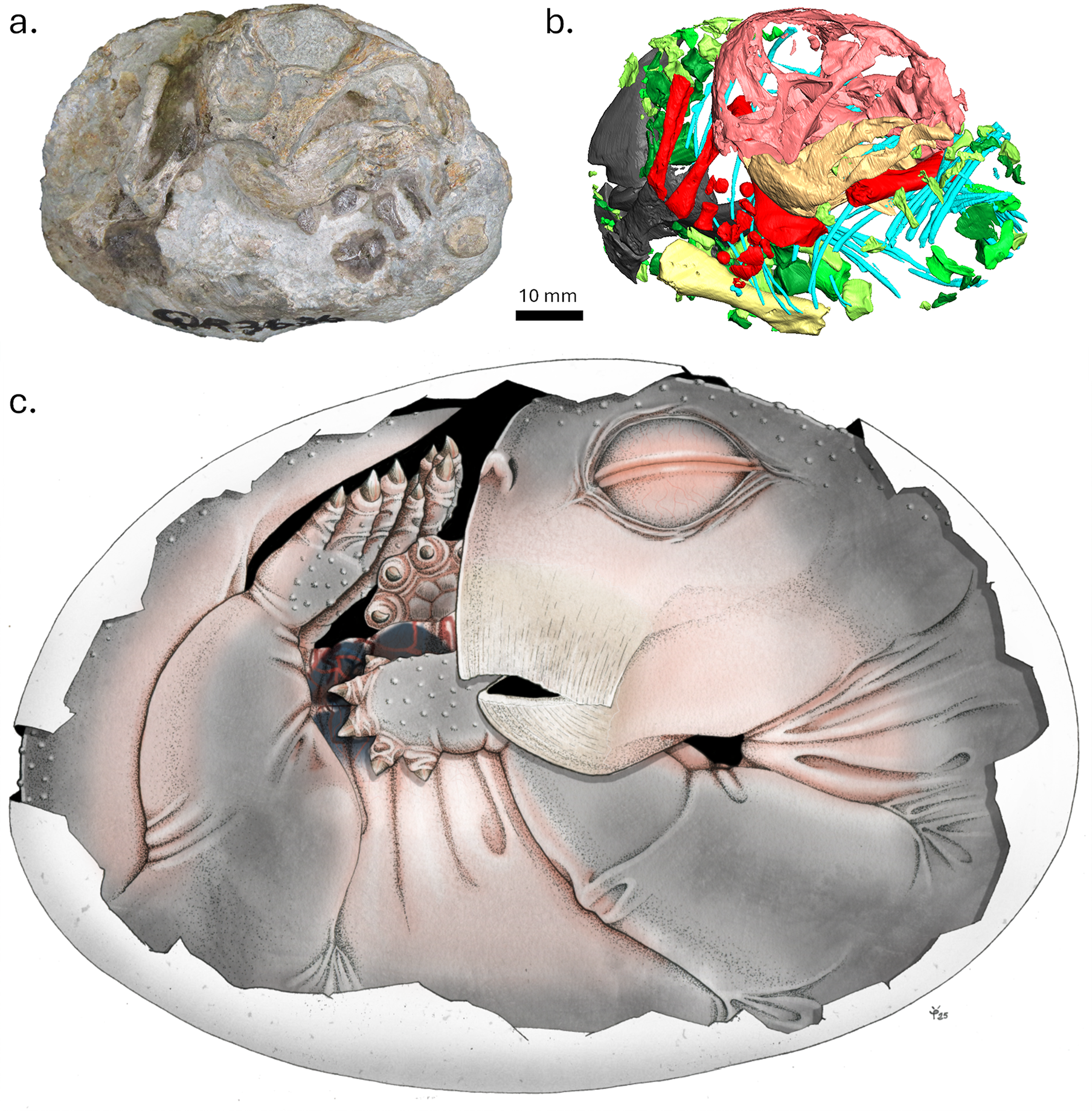
Preserved embryo of Lystrosaurus from the Early Triassic of South Africa, with life restoration by Sophie Vrard showing embryo curled up in inferred (but unpreserved) egg. a, photograph of the specimen; b, 3D digital reconstruction of the segmented bones Colour code for b: vertebral elements in shades of green, ribs in blue, forelimb elements in red, femur in yellow, pelvic girdle elements in grey, skull in light red, mandible in light orange.

A preserved tightly curled embryonic individual of Lystrosaurus (probably L. murrayi) from the Early Triassic of South Africa suggests that dicynodonts laid eggs, as is thought to be ancestral for synapsids and amniotes, though the lack of preserved eggshell suggests that the eggs were probably soft and leathery as is found in living monotreme mammals and is suggested to be ancestral for amniotes. The relatively large size of the eggs compared to body size suggests individuals of Lystrosaurus were precocial (relatively independent from birth), and that the embryo had enough yolk to develop enough before hatching to not require additional nutrients from milk nursing like mammals, suggesting that Lystrosaurus and by extension other dicynodonts did not produce milk. Similarly, the well developed jaws of more developed presumed hatchling-stage individuals, suggests that they were capable of eating relatively hard foods from birth.

An aggregation of nine young juveniles together suggests the clutch of Lystrosaurus may have been relatively small-medium sized, compared to clutch size of 38 known from the Triassic cynodont genus Kayentatherium. Species of Lystrosaurus are suggested to have had rapid growth rates, which were perhaps elastic and slowed in the face of adverse conditions. At least Early Triassic Lystrosaurus likely had an early onset of sexual maturity before they had reached maximum body size (somatic maturity), with analysis suggesting the vast majority of known Early Triassic individuals of Lystrosaurus, even relatively large ones, were still growing at the time of their death. They may have experienced high mortality rates, especially of juveniles.

=== Habitat and behaviour ===
Stress analysis of the skull of Lystrosaurus suggests that its deep and short skull and mobility of the joint between the premaxilla and nasal skull bones enabled to it to use a quick, snapping bite to cut up tough fibrous plants, which may have included horsetail relatives like Phyllotheca. Specimens of Lystrosaurus individuals have been found preserved in burrows, suggesting that they were habitually fossorial, and were capable of constructing burrows relatively early in life. It has been suggested that individuals of Lystrosaurus from the Early Triassic of Antarctica went into a state of torpor or hibernation based on stress growth marks preserved in their tusks (which are absent from individuals from the more northern South Africa) to cope with the polar seasonality and limited light levels for significant parts of the year.

Some authors, beginning with Robert Broom in 1902, have suggested that Lystrosaurus was semi-aquatic and spent large amounts of time in water; however, this has been disputed, because the environments in which Lystrosaurus lived were often quite arid, and the skeletal anatomy of Lystrosaurus does not display any obvious anatomical adaptations to living in water. The internal anatomy of the limb bones, which contain trabecular infilling of the medullary cavity, which is often found in living aquatic mammals, has been argued to support the aquatic hypothesis; however, some authors have found that this trait provides no evidence of an aquatic lifestyle because it contradicts the rest of the anatomy of Lystrosaurus, and that it instead may have served to strengthen the limb bones for use in fossorial burrowing, and that Lystrosaurus was probably fully terrestrial.

== Paleoecology ==
=== Dominance of the Early Triassic ===
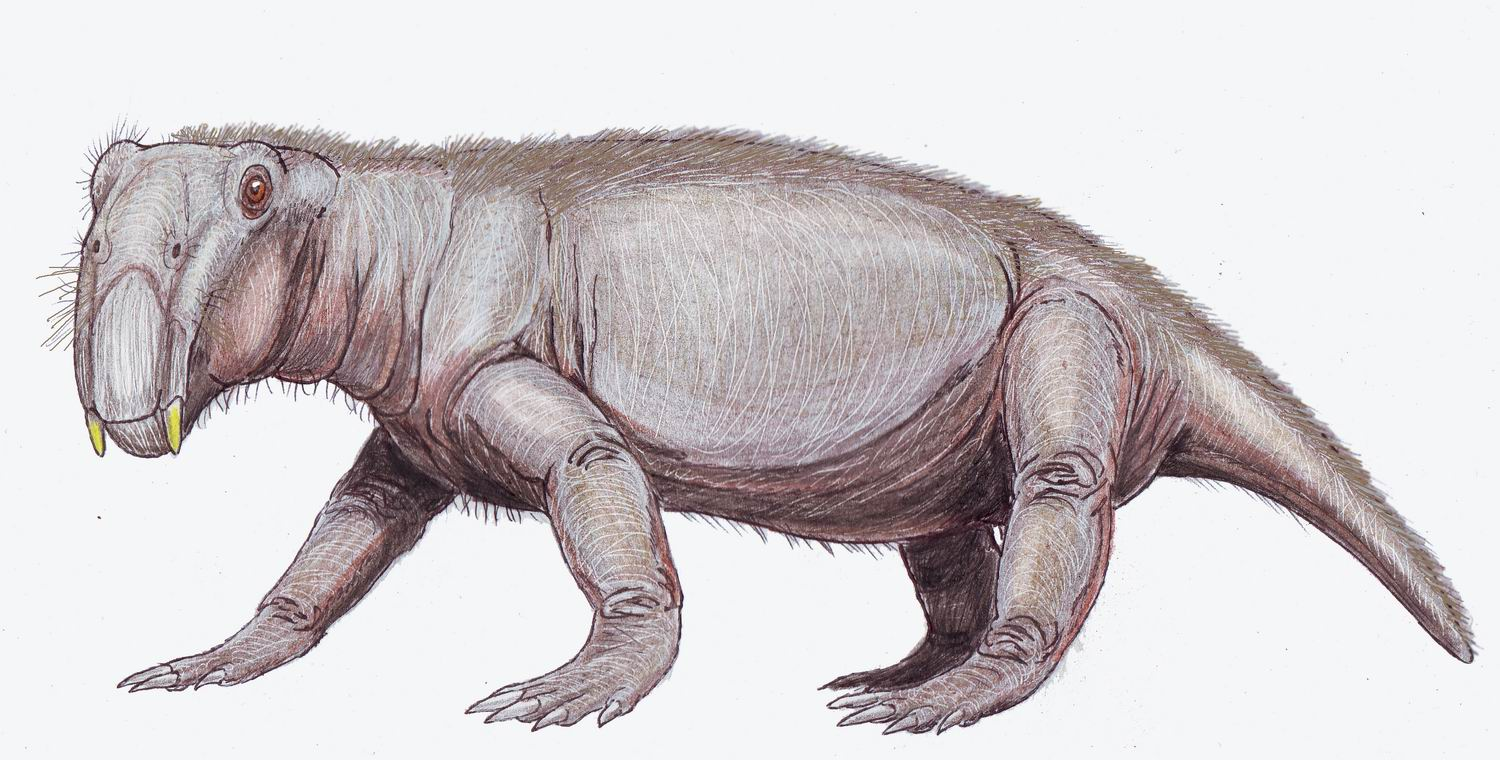
Lystrosaurus georgi

Lystrosaurus is notable for dominating southern Pangaea for millions of years during the Early Triassic. At least one unidentified species of this genus survived the end-Permian mass extinction and, in the absence of predators and herbivorous competitors, went on to thrive and re-radiate into a number of species within the genus, becoming the most common group of terrestrial vertebrates during the Early Triassic; for a while, 95% of land vertebrates in the Lystrosaurus Assemblage Zone in South Africa were Lystrosaurus. This is the only time that a single species or genus of land animal dominated the Earth to such a degree. A few other Permian therapsid genera also survived the mass extinction and appear in Triassic rocks—the therocephalians Tetracynodon, Moschorhinus, and Promoschorhynchus (the latter based on specimens originally attributed to Ictidosuchoides)—but do not appear to have been abundant in the Triassic; complete ecological recovery took 30 million years, spanning the Early and Middle Triassic.

Several attempts have been made to explain why Lystrosaurus survived the Permian–Triassic extinction event, the "mother of all mass extinctions", and why it dominated Early Triassic fauna to such an unprecedented extent:

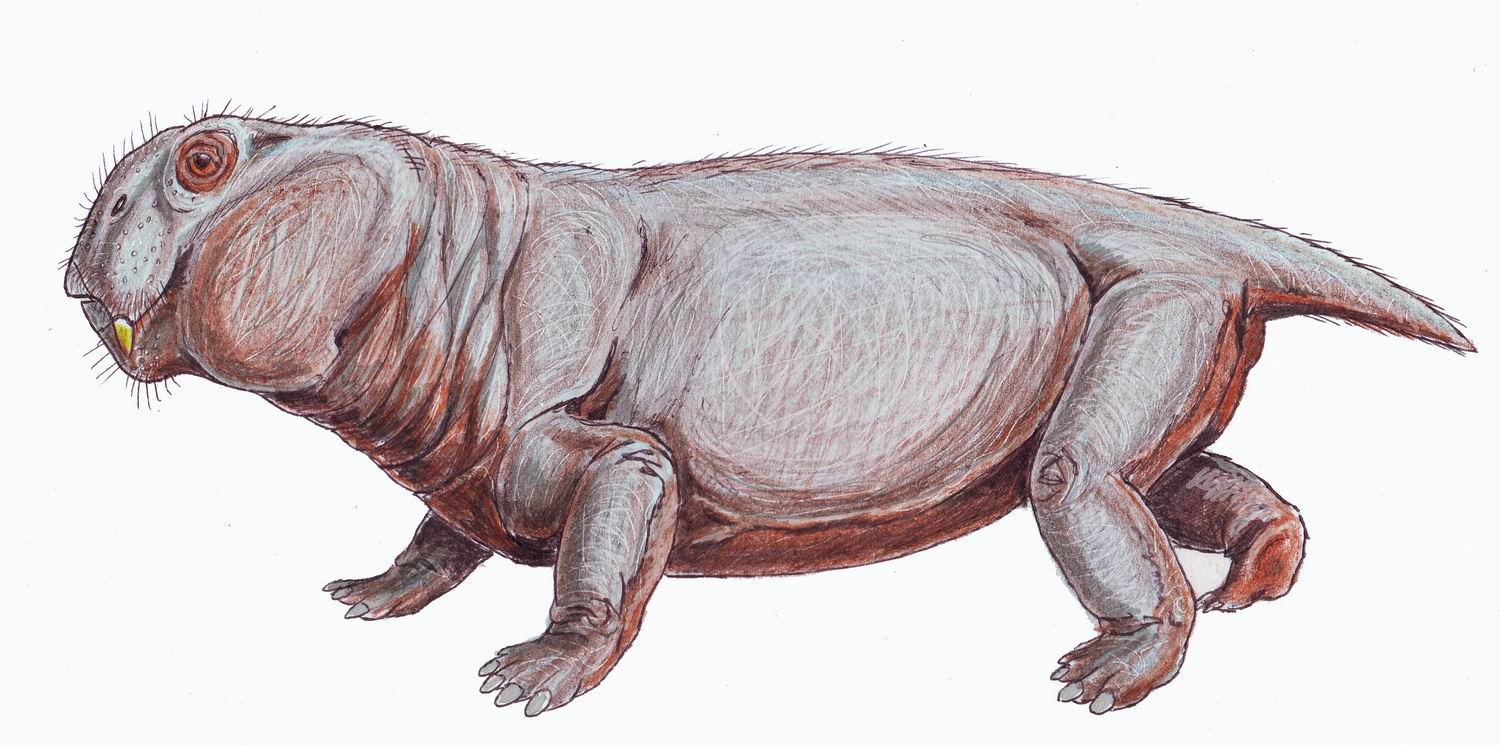
Lystrosaurus murrayi

- Lystrosaurus has been suggested as a highly adaptable generalist with a flexible physiology able to tolerate a wide range of environmental conditions.
- The suggested ability of polar Antarctic Lystrosaurus to enter torpor/hibernation has been suggested as a reason for its survival across the Permian-Triassic boundary, as Antarctica is thought to have served as a key refugium for animal species during this period, despite its harsh seasonality due to its polar latitude.
- One of the more recent theories is that the extinction event reduced the atmosphere's oxygen content and increased its carbon dioxide content, so that many terrestrial species died out because they found breathing too difficult. It has therefore been suggested that Lystrosaurus survived and became dominant because its burrowing life-style made it able to cope with an atmosphere of "stale air", and that specific features of its anatomy were part of this adaptation: a barrel chest that accommodated large lungs, short internal nostrils that facilitated rapid breathing, and high neural spines (projections on the dorsal side of the vertebrae) that gave greater leverage to the muscles that expanded and contracted its chest. However, there are weaknesses in all these points: the chest of Lystrosaurus was not significantly larger in proportion to its size than in other dicynodonts that became extinct; although Triassic dicynodonts appear to have had longer neural spines than their Permian counterparts, this feature may be related to posture, locomotion or even body size rather than respiratory efficiency; L. murrayi and L. declivis are much more abundant than other Early Triassic burrowers such as Procolophon or Thrinaxodon.
- The suggestion that Lystrosaurus was helped to survive and dominate by being semi-aquatic has a similar weakness: although temnospondyls become more abundant in the Karoo's Triassic sediments, they were much less numerous than L. murrayi and L. declivis.
- The most specialized and the largest animals are at higher risk in mass extinctions; this may explain why the unspecialized L. curvatus survived while the larger and more specialized L. maccaigi perished along with all the other large Permian herbivores and carnivores. Although Lystrosaurus generally looks adapted to feed on plants similar to Dicroidium, which dominated the Early Triassic, the larger size of L. maccaigi may have forced it to rely on the larger members of the Glossopteris flora, which did not survive the end-Permian extinction.
- Only the 1.5 m (5 ft)–long therocephalian Moschorhinus and the large archosauriform Proterosuchus appear to be large enough to have preyed on the Triassic Lystrosaurus species, and this shortage of predators may have been responsible for a Lystrosaurus population boom in the Early Triassic.
- According to Benton, "Perhaps the survival of Lystrosaurus was simply a matter of luck".

== See also ==
- Evolution of mammals
- Lists of synapsids
