= Sintocephalus =

Sintocephalus Temporal range: Late Permian

Scientific classification
- Domain: Eukaryota
- Kingdom: Animalia
- Phylum: Chordata
- Clade: Synapsida
- Clade: Therapsida
- Suborder: †Anomodontia
- Clade: †Dicynodontia
- Family: †Lystrosauridae
- Genus: †Sintocephalus; Van Hoepen, 1934

Type species
- †S. alticeps (Broom and Haughton, 1913) (originally Dicynodon alticeps)

Extinct genus of dicynodonts

Sintocephalus is an extinct genus of dicynodont therapsid from the Late Permian of South Africa. Fossils are known from the Cistecephalus Assemblage Zone of the Beaufort Group. The type species of Sintocephalus, S. alticeps, was first named in 1913 as a species of Dicynodon. The genus was erected in 1934, but in subsequent years its species were often regarded as members of other dicynodont genera.

== Description ==
Compared to other dicynodonts, Sintocephalus is distinguished by the thickness and upward curve of its temporal arch behind the eyes. It also has a sharply sloped snout, large eye sockets, and tusks that are positioned forward in the upper jaw. The intertemporal region at the top of the skull between the two temporal fenestrae is very wide.

== History ==
The type species S. alticeps was first named by paleontologists Robert Broom and Sidney H. Haughton in 1913. Broom and Haughton regarded it as a species of Dicynodon, calling it D. alticeps. In 1934, paleontologist E. C. N. van Hoepen considered D. alticeps to be distinct from other Dicynodon, and placed it in its own genus Sintocephalus. Van Hoepen also reassigned Dicynodon gilli, Dicynodon jouberti, and Dicynodon woodwardi to this genus. S. gilli and S. woodwardi were later considered valid species of Dicynodon (although they are currently classified in the genera Dinanomodon and Basilodon), and S. jouberti has since been transferred to the genus Diictodon. In 1986, paleontologist A. S. Brink synonymized the type species S. alticeps with Dicynodon lacerticeps. Because a genus is defined by its type species, the abandonment of S. alticeps implied that the name Sintocephalus was no longer valid. However, Brink kept the name Sintocephalus for S. gilli. Most other paleontologists have abandoned the use of Sintocephalus altogether.

Following a phylogenetic analysis of dicynodonts by Christian F. Kammerer, Kenneth D. Angielczyk, and Jörg Fröbisch in 2011, Sintocephalus was reinstated as a valid genus including the species S. alticeps. The holotype specimen of S. alticeps was distinguished from D. lacerticeps material, and the species was found to be separate from the Dicynodon clade (which included only D. lacerticeps and D. huenei). S. alticeps was placed in the family Lystrosauridae, with its closest relative being Basilodon woodwardi. Below is a cladogram showing the phylogenetic placement of Sintocephalus in the analysis of Kammerer et al. (2011):

- Dicynodontoidea
  - Interpresosaurus
  - Elph
  - Katumbia
  - - Gordonia traquairi
    - - Delectosaurus
      - - Vivaxosaurus trautscholdi
        - - Dicynodon
            - Dicynodon lacerticeps
            - Dicynodon huenei
          - - - Daptocephalus leoniceps
              - - Dinanomodon gilli
                - Peramodon amalitzkii
            - - Lystrosauridae
                - Jimusaria sinkianensis
                - - Syops vanhoepeni
                  - - - Euptychognathus bathyrhynchus
                      - - TSK 2
                        - - Sintocephalus alticeps
                          - Basilodon woodwardi
                    - - Lystrosaurus
                      - Kwazulusaurus
              - - Turfanodon
                - Kannemeyeriiformes
  Species previously assigned to Sintocephalus
