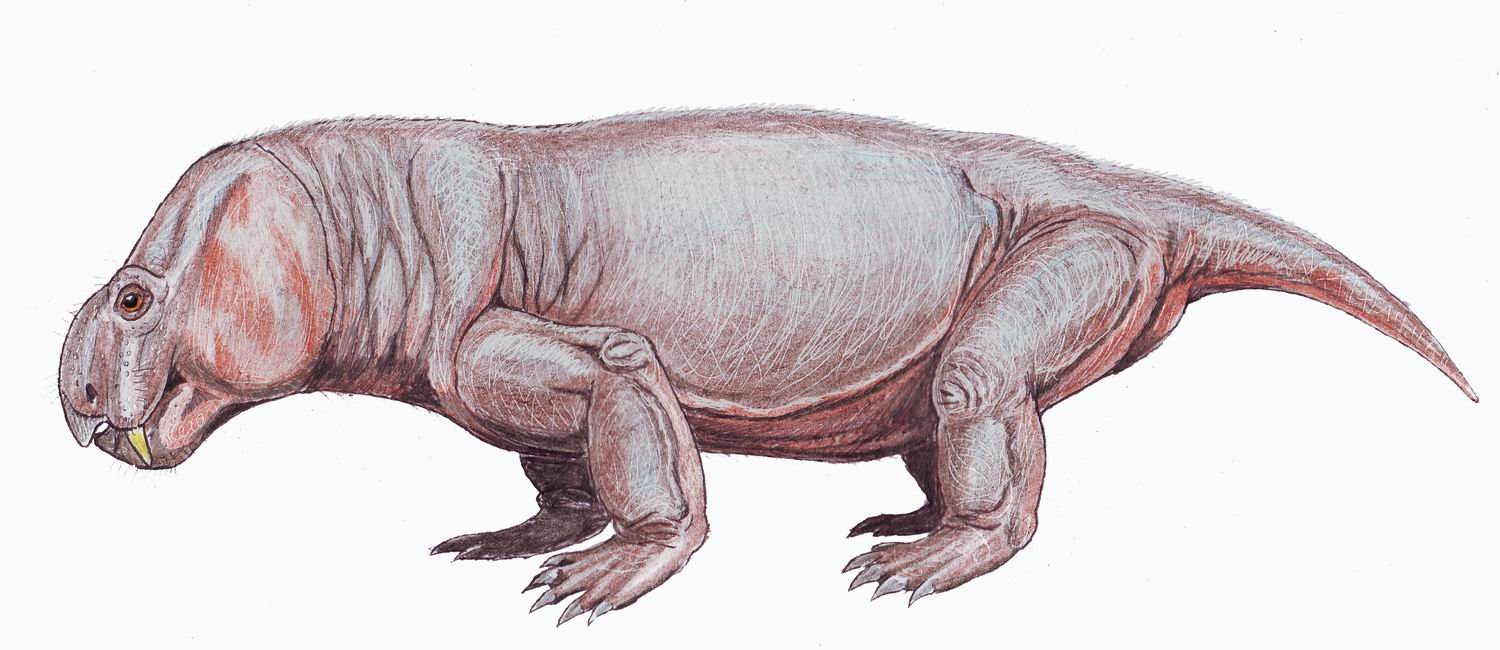
- Life restoration of Vivaxosaurus

Scientific classification
- Kingdom: Animalia
- Phylum: Chordata
- Clade: Synapsida
- Clade: Therapsida
- Clade: †Anomodontia
- Clade: †Dicynodontia
- Clade: †Bidentalia
- Infraorder: †Dicynodontoidea; Olson, 1944

Subgroups
- †Counillonia; †Daptocephalus; †Delectosaurus; †Dinanomodon; †Gordonia; †Peramodon; †Taoheodon; †Turfanodon; †Vivaxosaurus; †Dicynodontidae; †Lystrosauridae; †Kannemeyeriiformes

= Dicynodontoidea =

Dicynodontoidea Temporal range: Late Permian - Late Triassic

Extinct infraorder of dicynodonts

Dicynodontoidea is an infraorder of dicynodont therapsids that includes the famous dicynodont Dicynodon, Lystrosaurus and the Triassic Kannemeyeriiformes, as well as numerous other closely related species. The name was coined by American paleontologist Everett C. Olson in 1944 as an infraorder, despite using the typical "-oidea" suffix of superfamilies, and was later redefined under a phylogenetic context in 2009 by paleontologist Christian F. Kammerer.

Cladogram after Kammerer et al. 2025:

- Dicynodontoidea
  - Taoheodon
  - - - Repelinosaurus
      - Counillonia
    - - Dicynodon
      - - - Delectosaurus
          - Vivaxosaurus
        - - Lystrosauridae
            - - Lystrosaurus
              - Lystrosauravus
            - - Madumabisa
              - Euptychognathus
          - - - Basilodon
              - Sintocephalus
            - - - Syops
                - - Jimusaria
                  - - Gordonia
                    - Keyseria
              - - Kannemeyeriiformes
                - - Peramodon
                  - - Daptocephalus
                    - - Dinanomodon
                      - Turfanodon
