= Keyseria =

Keyseria Temporal range: Late Permian

Scientific classification
- Domain: Eukaryota
- Kingdom: Animalia
- Phylum: Chordata
- Clade: Synapsida
- Clade: Therapsida
- Suborder: †Anomodontia
- Clade: †Dicynodontia
- Clade: †Cryptodontia
- Genus: †Keyseria; Kammerer et al., 2011

Type species
- †K. benjamini (Broom, 1948)

Extinct genus of dicynodonts

Keyseria is an extinct genus of dicynodont therapsid. The type species K. benjamini was first named in 1948 as Dicynodon benjamini.
