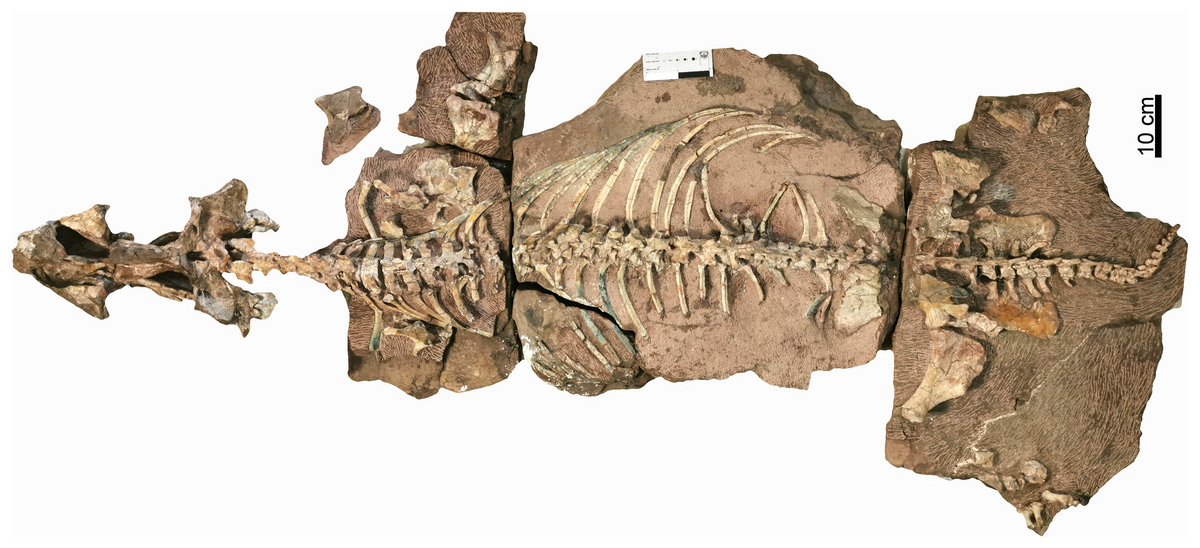
- Holotype specimen of T. jiufengensis (IVPP V 26038)

Scientific classification
- Kingdom: Animalia
- Phylum: Chordata
- Clade: Synapsida
- Clade: Therapsida
- Clade: †Anomodontia
- Clade: †Dicynodontia
- Clade: †Bidentalia
- Infraorder: †Dicynodontoidea
- Genus: †Turfanodon; Sun, 1973

Type species
- †Turfanodon bogdaensis Sun, 1973

Other species
- †T. jiufengensis Liu, 2021

Synonyms
- T. bogdaensis: Dicynodon bogdaensis King, 1988; Dicynodon sunanensis Li, Cheng, and Li, 2000; Striodon magnus Sun, 1978

= Turfanodon =

Turfanodon Temporal range: Late Permian ~254–252.3 Ma

Extinct genus of dicynodonts

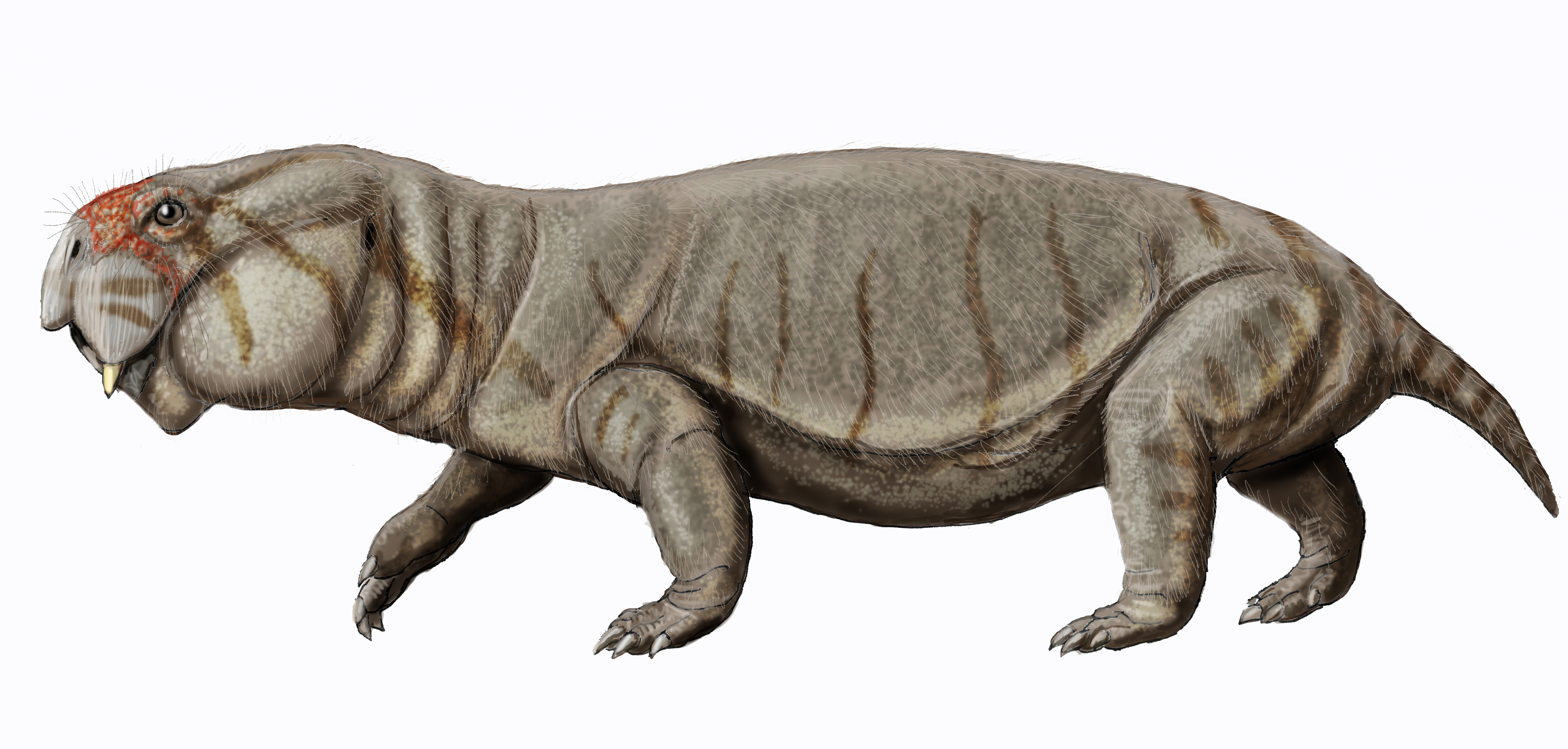
Life restoration

Turfanodon is an extinct genus of dicynodont therapsid from the Late Permian Sunan, Guodikeng, and Naobaogou Formations of China. The holotype of T. bogdaensis was discovered between 1963-1964 and was originally named in 1973 by A. Sun with the type species Turfanodon bogdaensis, Turfanodon was reclassified as a junior synonym of the related Dicynodon in 1988 by G. M. King. T. bogdaensis remained a species of Dicynodon for over two decades before the genus was reinstated in 2011 in a revision of the taxonomy of Dicynodon by palaeontologist Christian Kammerer. A second species from Inner Mongolia, T. jiufengensis, was named in 2021 by palaeontologist Jun Liu from a nearly complete skeleton and other referred bones. Turfanodon was a relatively large dicynodont, and similar in appearance to the related Daptocephalus from South Africa.
