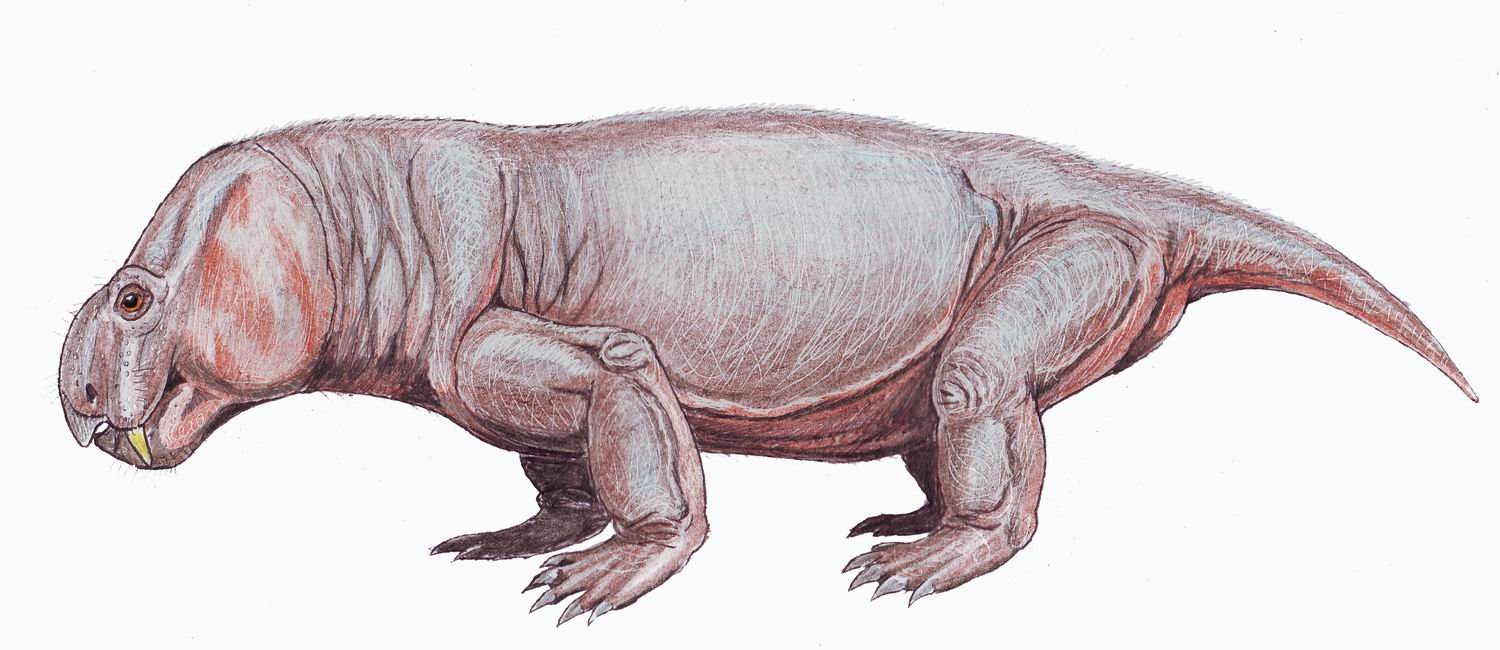
- Life restoration of Vivaxosaurus trautscholdi

Scientific classification
- Kingdom: Animalia
- Phylum: Chordata
- Class: Synapsida
- Order: Therapsida
- Suborder: Anomodontia
- Infraorder: Dicynodontia
- Genus: Vivaxosaurus Kalandadze & Kurkin, 2000

Species
- V. trautscholdi (type)

Synonyms
- Fortunodon Kurkin, 2012

= Vivaxosaurus =

Vivaxosaurus Temporal range: Late Permian

Extinct genus of dicynodonts

Vivaxosaurus is a genus of dicynodont from the late Permian (Changhsingian) of Russia. It has been found at Sokolki on the Northern Dvina River near Kotlas in Arkhangelsk Oblast. Vivaxosaurus was likely a contemporary of Inostrancevia, Scutosaurus, and Dvinia. Like all members of the genus, this animal was toothless, except for prominent tusks, and probably cropped vegetation with a horny beak, like a tortoise.

== History ==
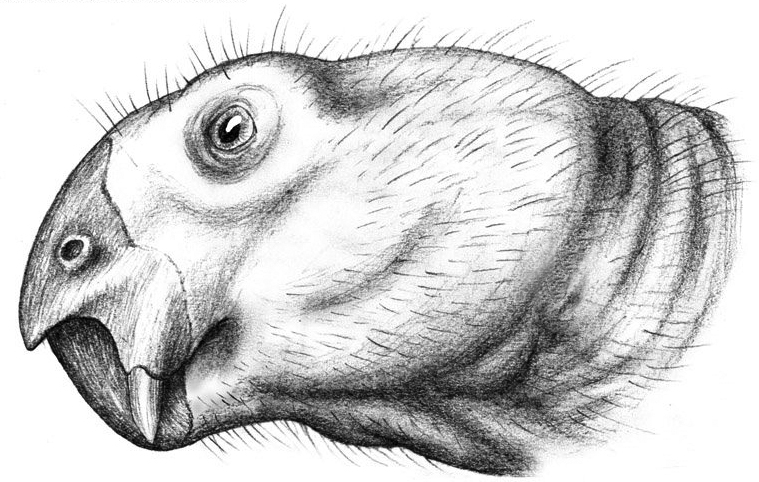
Restoration based on a juvenile specimen tentatively assigned to Vivaxosaurus

The contemporary species Dicynodon amalitzkii Sushkin, 1926 is closely related (Angielczyk and Kurkin 2003a, 2003b), although according to Lucas 2005, Dicynodon trautscholdi, Dicynodon amalitzkii, Elph borealis, and Vivaxosaurus permirus are all synonyms, which makes D. amalitzkii the junior synonym of D. trautscholdi. Other suggested synonyms are Gordonia annae Amalitskii, 1922, Oudenodon venyokovi Amalitskii, 1922, and Dicynodon annae (Amalitskii, 1922).

In 2011, Vivaxosaurus permirus and Dicynodon trautscholdi were combined as Vivaxosaurus trautscholdi. This same study also moved D. amalitzkii to the genus Peramodon. In 2012, the species D. trautscholdi was moved to the genus Fortunodon, independently of its synonymization with V. permirus; this makes Fortunodon a subjective junior synonym of Vivaxosaurus trautscholdi.
