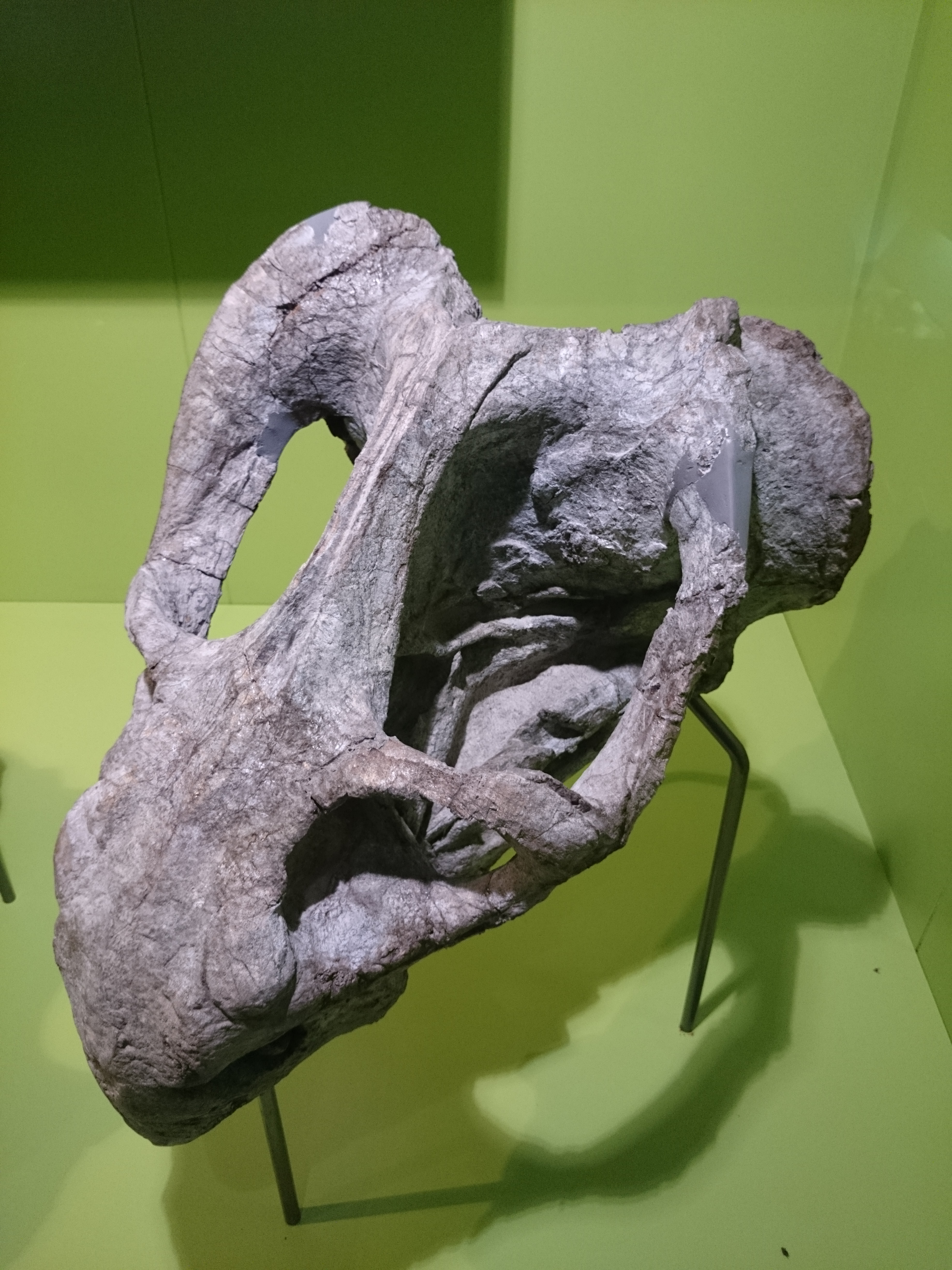
- Skull of Dinanomodon gilli (SAM-PK-K10220) on display in the Iziko South African Museum

Scientific classification
- Kingdom: Animalia
- Phylum: Chordata
- Clade: Synapsida
- Clade: Therapsida
- Clade: †Anomodontia
- Clade: †Dicynodontia
- Infraorder: †Dicynodontoidea
- Genus: †Dinanomodon; Broom 1938

Type species
- †Dinanomodon rubidgei Broom, 1938 (Junior synonym of D. gilli)

Species
- †D. gilli (Broom, 1932); †D. guoi Shi & Liu, 2025

Synonyms
- Synonyms of D. gilli: Dicynodon gilli Broom, 1932; Dinanomodon rubidgei Broom, 1938; Dicynodon macrodon Broom 1940; Dicynodon anneae Broom 1940; Dinanomodon gigas Broom 1940; Dicynodon galecephalus Broom & Robinson 1948; Dicynodon whitsonae Toerien 1954

= Dinanomodon =

Dinanomodon Temporal range: Late Permian (Wuchiapingian-Changhsingian) ~256–252 Ma

Extinct genus of dicynodonts

Dinanomodon is a genus of dicynodont that lived during the Late Permian (Lopingian) of the South Africa and China. Two species are recognised, D. gilli from the Cistecephalus and Daptocephalus Assemblage Zones of the Balfour Formation, Beaufort Group, in the Karoo Basin of South Africa, and D. guoi from the Gansu Province of China.
