= Delectosaurus =

Delectosaurus Temporal range: Late Permian

Scientific classification
- Kingdom: Animalia
- Phylum: Chordata
- Class: Synapsida
- Order: Therapsida
- Suborder: Anomodontia
- Infraorder: Dicynodontia
- Genus: Delectosaurus Kurkin, 2001

Species
- D. arefjevi; D. berezhanensis

Extinct genus of dicynodonts

Delectosaurus is a genus of dicynodont from Late Permian (Changhsingian) of Russia.
