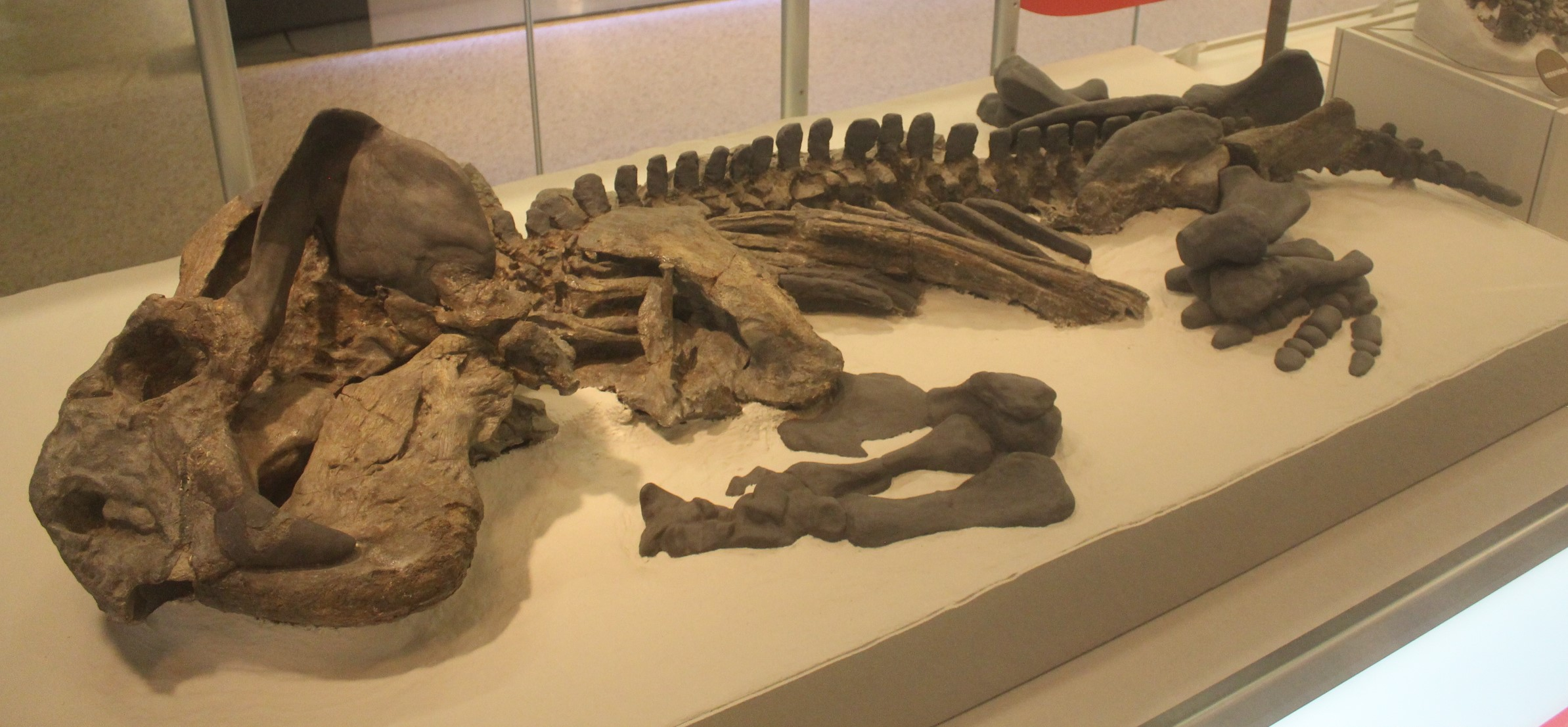
- Articulated D. leoniceps skeleton (USNM 23354), National Museum of Natural History

Scientific classification
- Kingdom: Animalia
- Phylum: Chordata
- Clade: Synapsida
- Clade: Therapsida
- Clade: †Anomodontia
- Clade: †Dicynodontia
- Infraorder: †Dicynodontoidea
- Genus: †Daptocephalus van Hoepen, 1934

Type species
- †Daptocephalus leoniceps Owen, 1876

Species
- †D. leoniceps Owen, 1876; †D. huenei Haughton, 1932

Synonyms
- List: Rhachinocephalodon leoniceps (Owen, 1876); Daptocephalus leontops Broom, 1913; Daptocephalus lissops Broom, 1913; Daptocephalus osborni Broom, 1921; Daptocephalus watsoni Broom ,1921; Dicynodon daptocephaloides Toerien, 1955; Dicynodon ingens Broom, 1907; Dicynodon leontocephalus Broom, 1950; Dicynodon leontops Broom, 1913; Dicynodon lissops Broom, 1913; Dicynodon osborni Broom, 1921; Dicynodon watsoni Broom, 1921

= Daptocephalus =

Daptocephalus Temporal range: Changhsingian

Extinct genus of dicynodonts

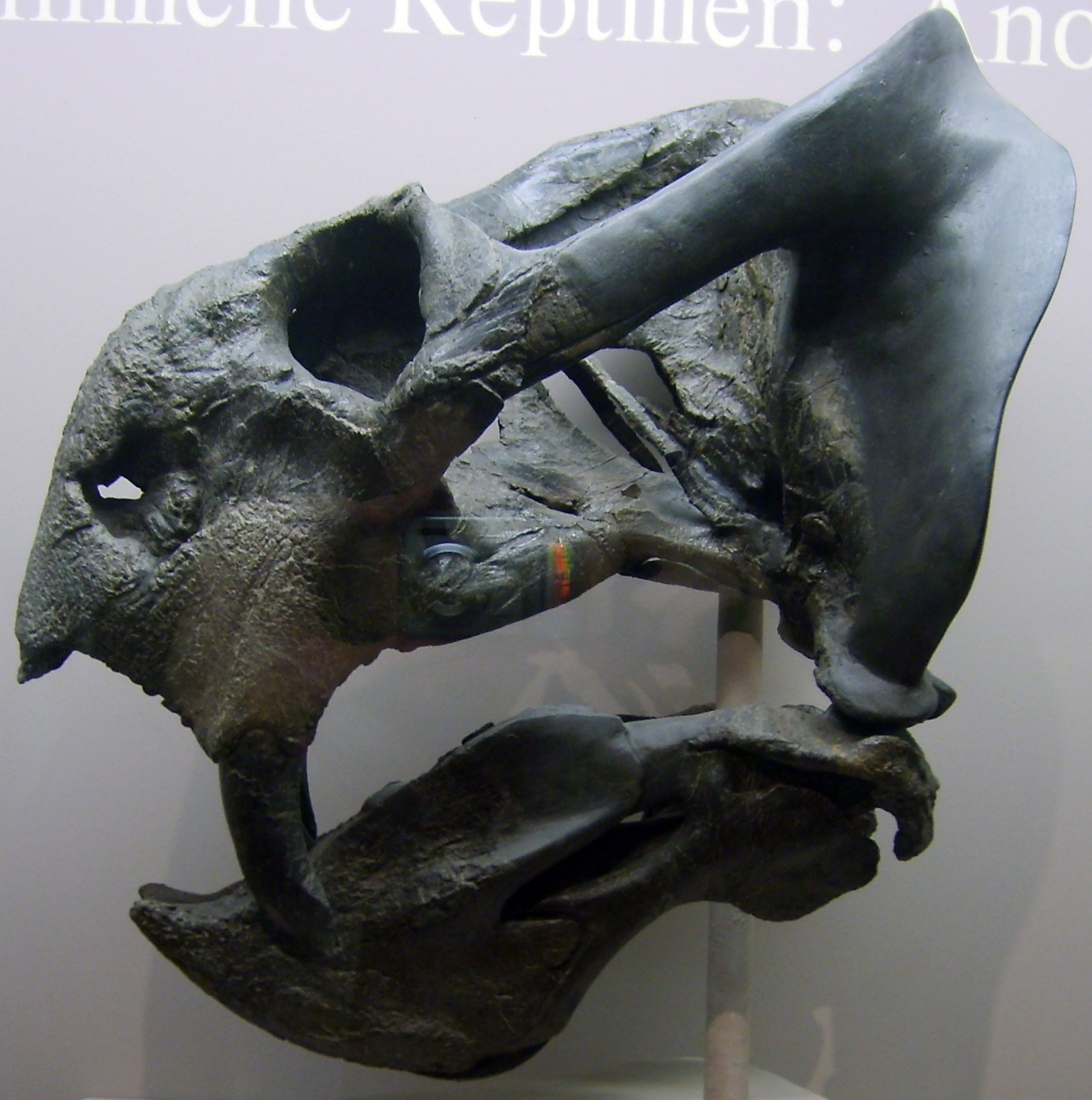
D. leoniceps skull, Natural History Museum, Berlin

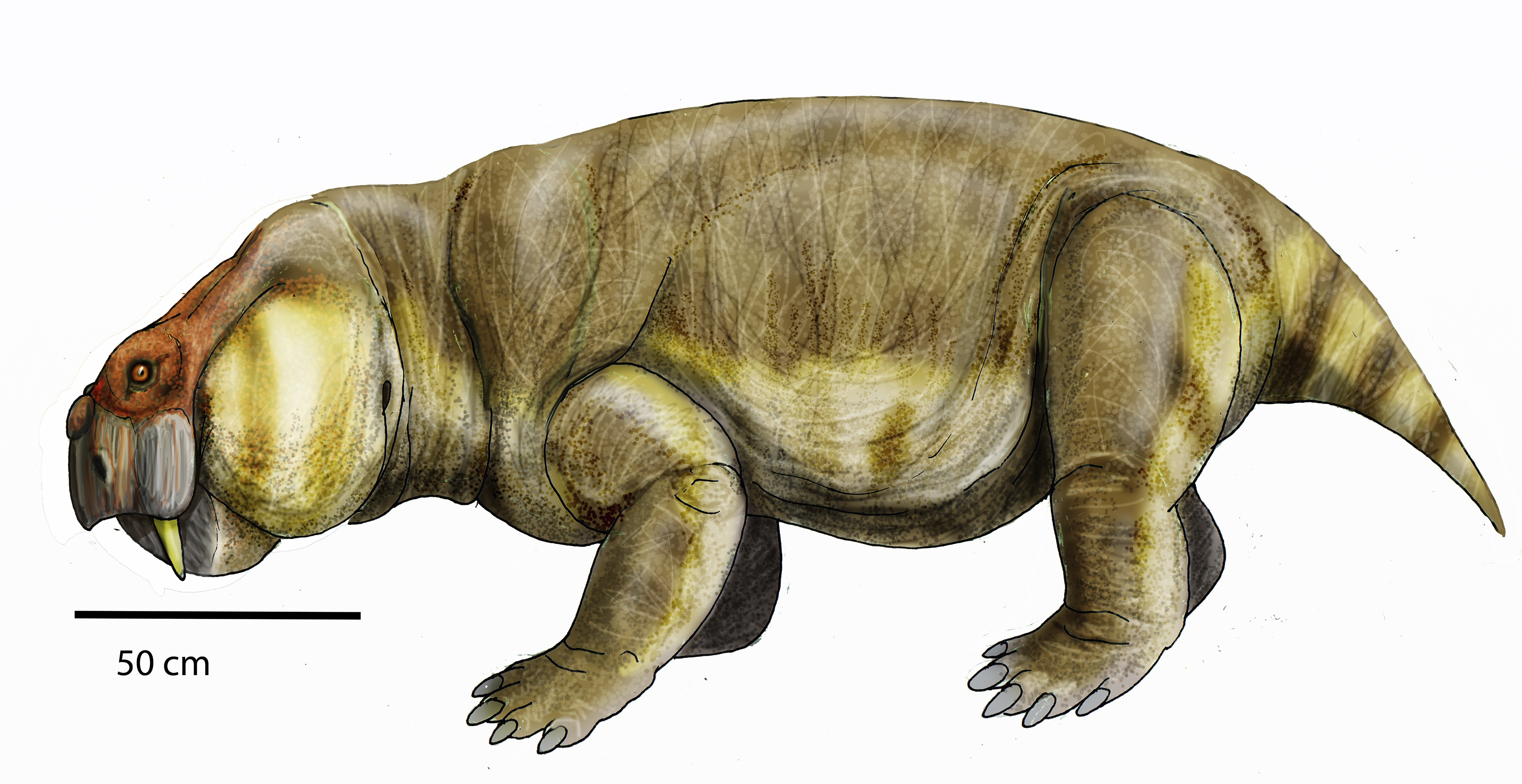
Restoration of D. leoniceps

Daptocephalus is an extinct genus of dicynodont synapsid, which was found in Late Permian strata, in a biozone known precisely for the presence of fossils of this dicynodont, the Daptocephalus Assemblage Zone, in the Karoo Basin in South Africa. An additional species, D. huenei, is known from the Usili Formation in Tanzania and was formerly assigned to the genus Dicynodon before a study in 2019 recognised that the type specimen belonged to Daptocephalus.

== See also ==
- List of therapsids
