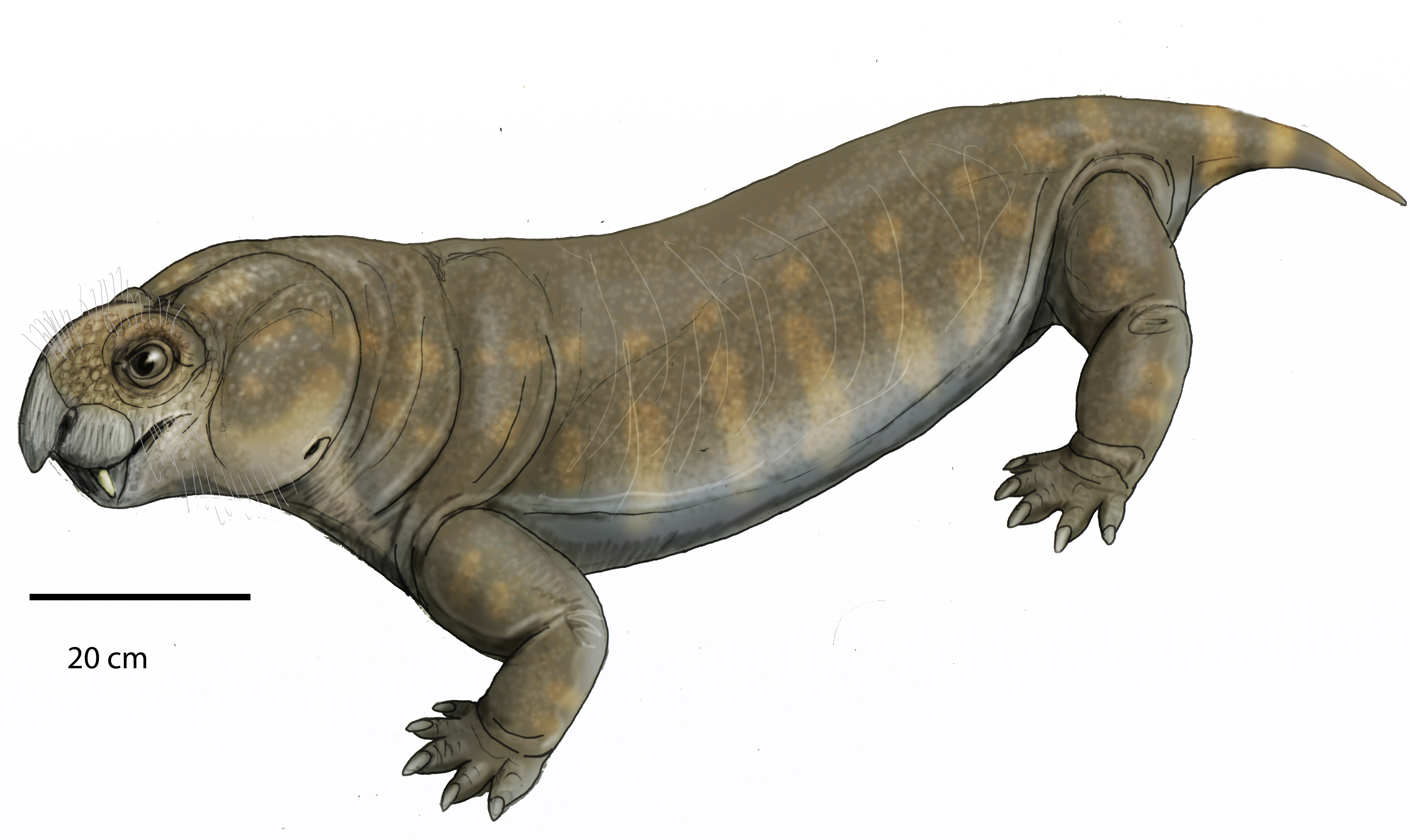
- Life restoration

Scientific classification
- Domain: Eukaryota
- Kingdom: Animalia
- Phylum: Chordata
- Clade: Synapsida
- Clade: Therapsida
- Suborder: †Anomodontia
- Clade: †Dicynodontia
- Infraorder: †Dicynodontoidea
- Genus: †Peramodon; Kammerer et al. 2011

Type species
- †P. amalitzkii (Sushkin 1926)

= Peramodon =

Peramodon Temporal range: Late Permian ~259–252.3 Ma

Extinct genus of dicynodonts

Peramodon is an extinct genus of dicynodont therapsid from the Late Permian Scutosaurus karpinskii Zone of the Salarevo Formation of Russia. The type species, P. amalitzkii, was first named in 1926 as Dicynodon amalitzkii.
