= Katberg Formation =

Geological formation in the Beaufort Group of the Karoo Supergroup in South Africa

- Stratigraphic range: Early Triassic; Induan-Olenekian; ~252–247 Ma
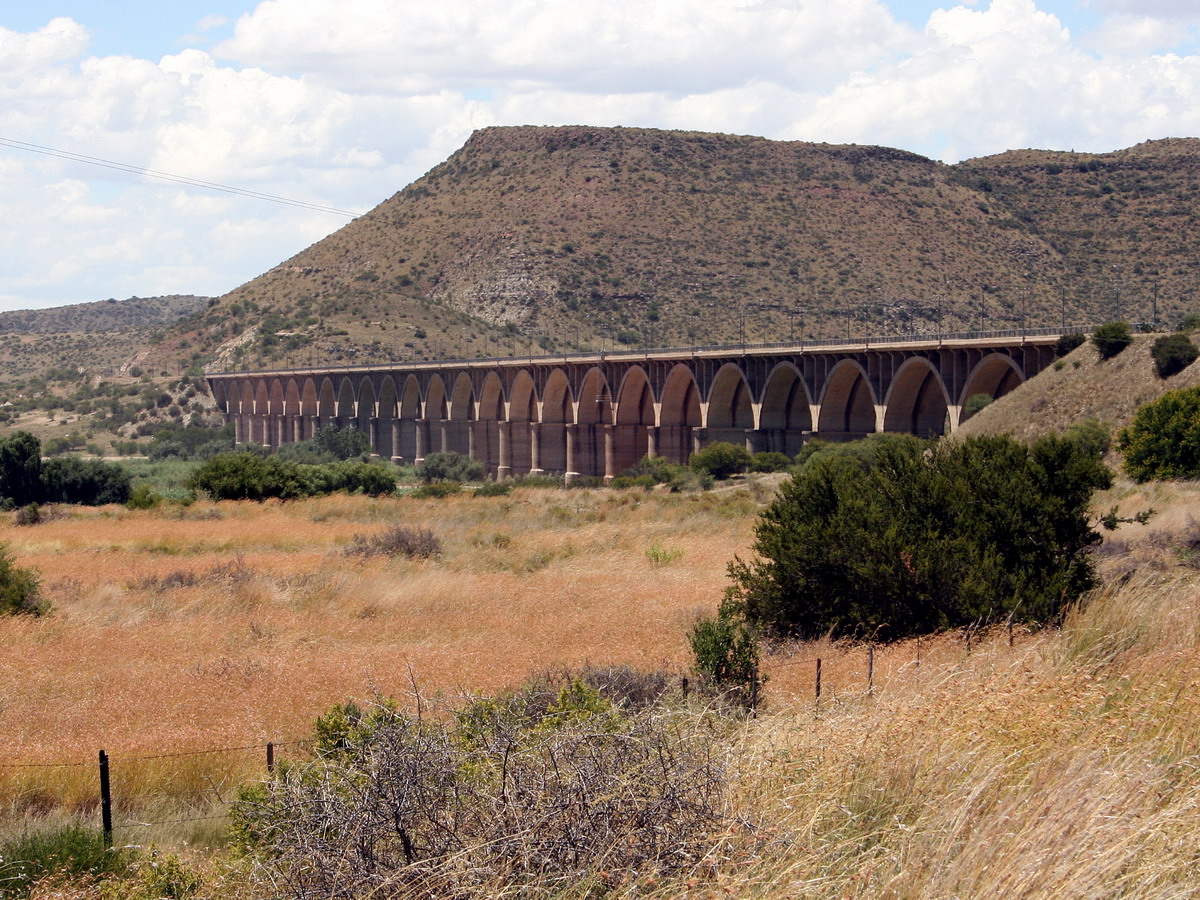
- Hillside overlooking Gariep Dam where Katberg Formation rocks are known
- Type: Geological formation
- Unit of: Beaufort Group
- Underlies: Burgersdorp Formation
- Overlies: Balfour Formation
- Thickness: up to 1,000 m (3,300 ft)

Lithology
- Primary: Sandstone
- Other: Mudstone, calcareous concretions

Location
- Coordinates: 30.5°S 26.0°E
- Approximate paleocoordinates: 65.0°S 23.6°W
- Region: Eastern Cape & Free State
- Country: South Africa
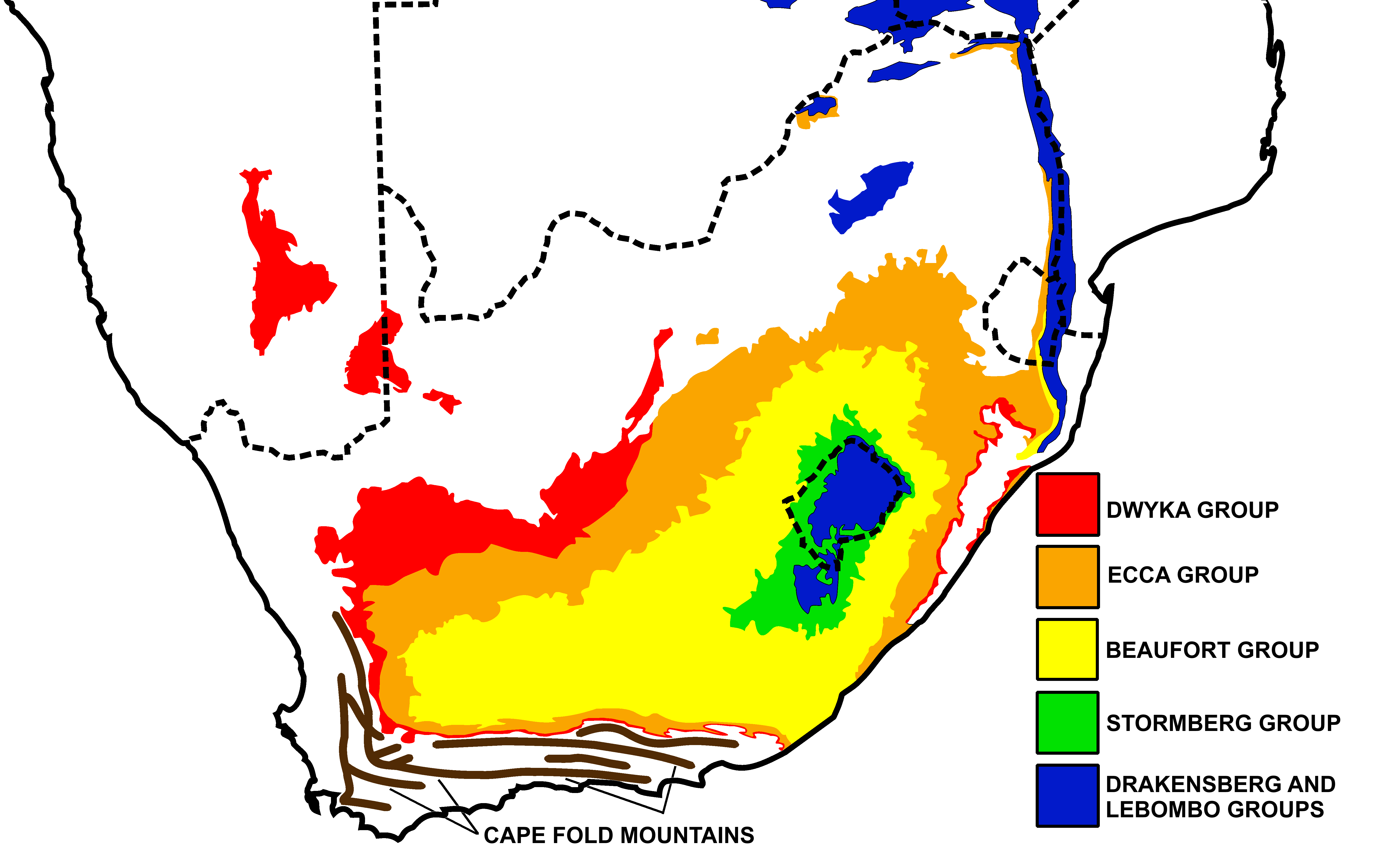

The Katberg Formation is a geological formation that is found in the Beaufort Group, a major geological group that forms part of the greater Karoo Supergroup in South Africa. The Katberg Formation is the lowermost geological formation of the Tarkastad Subgroup which contains the Lower to Middle Triassic-aged rocks of the Beaufort Group. Outcrops and exposures of the Katberg Formation are found east of 24 degrees onwards and north of Graaff-Reniet, Nieu Bethesda, Cradock, Fort Beaufort, Queensdown, and East London in the south, and ranges as far north as Harrismith in deposits that form a ring around the Drakensberg mountain ranges.

== Geology ==
The Katberg Formation overlies the Balfour Formation of the Adelaide Subgroup and the Burgersdorp Formation of the upper Tarkastad Subgroup, all pertaining to the greater Beaufort Group. The appearance of the Katberg Formation rocks starkly differs from the underlying Balfour Formation due to its high sandstone content and reddish colored mudstones. The high sandstone content of the Katberg Formation, which range from light olive grey, greenish grey, or light brownish grey in color, is a key characteristic of this formation. However, the rocks of the Katberg Formation are differentiated into southern and northern sedimentary facies which grade laterally into one another from the south upwards. The southern and northern Katberg Formation deposits also vary drastically in thickness.

The southern Katberg Formation deposits are the most sandstone-rich, comprising approximately 90 percent sandstone and are fine to medium-grained. Along the coast outcrops and exposures, especially close to East London, the Katberg sandstones are coarse-grained and contain pebbles up to 15 centimetres (5.9 in) in diameter. In the north the sandstones remain consistently fine-grained and exhibit fining upward cycles. The ratio between the sandstones and mudstones grows more equal in the northern deposits, making differentiation between the northern Katberg and Burgersdorp Formations tricky in areas. The Katberg Formation reaches its maximum thickness near East London at 1238 m, thinning out gradually northwards. The sandstones are predominantly tabular although exhibit some planar and trough cross-bedding along with horizontal laminations and ripple cross-laminations. The sandstones contain much thinner beds of brownish-red shale and reddish to purple and some minor greenish mudstones, which are frequently structureless or horizontally laminated. Mudstones become redder in colour in the upper Katberg deposits as it grades laterally into the Burgersdorp Formation. Intraformational mud clasts, pedogenic and calcareous nodules are found commonly throughout.

The appearance and proliferation of the sandstone deposits, especially in the southern and lower Katberg Formation, marks the change to an alluvial fan and braided river environment in the Early Triassic due to the presence of coarser-grained sandstones that lack fining upward sequences. Due to the ongoing biotic crises in the aftermath of the Permo-Triassic extinction event, rampant erosion took place as there was a stark drop in plant and animal species diversity. This resulted in unstable ecological niches. The environment at this time was also arid and hot where the rivers seasonally ran dry. When the rainy season arrived, flash floods took place. In the northern Katberg, a drop in the level of preserved sandstones reveals that by the beginning of the Middle Triassic ecosystems were beginning to stabilize after the Permo-Triassic extinction event. The presence of fine-grained sandstones and more plentiful mudstones show that there was a decrease in energy levels in the depositional environment, meaning that the fast flowing braided rivers were steadily replaced by slower flowing, meandering river channels. The environment was still semi-arid, however, due to the presence of the redder mudstones.

== Paleontology ==
The Katberg Formation documents the marked drop in species abundance due to biotic crises that followed the Permo-Triassic extinction event. The most ubiquitous fossils found are different species of Lystrosaurus as the Katberg Formation contains the rocks of the Lystrosaurus Assemblage Zone. The most common fossils found are those of Lystrosaurus murrayi and Lystrosaurus declivis. In the lower Katberg Formation, complete and sometimes mummified articulated skeletons of L. murrayi and L. declivus are found in bone beds containing several individuals. The bone beds are almost always overlain by mudstone infilled with sandstone and capped by other coarse-grained sediments. This provides substantial geological and taphonomical evidence that these Lystrosaurus died near to dried up river channels and were mummified in the arid climate before their remains were buried by flash floods.

The Permo-Triassic extinction event caused the extinction of all gorgonopsians and almost all dicynodont species except for Lystrosaurus and a select few other species such as Myosaurus gracilis. Therocephalian species experience a Lilliput effect where only smaller species survived and thrived after the extinction event. By the upper sections of the biozone, ecological niches began to recover as evidenced by the appearance of new species. Cynodonts experienced the greatest diversification with species such as Thrinaxodon liorhinus and Galesaurus planiceps being found. Small procolonphonid parareptiles such as Saurodektes kitchingorum and Procolophon trigoniceps are also found in the Katberg Formation. In addition, the earliest ancestors of Archosauria appear in the lower Katberg Formation.These species are known as archosauromorphs and archosauriformes. Examples of these are Prolacerta broomi and Proterosuchus fergusi respectively. Notably, the Katberg Formation frequently yields burrow casts left by Lystrosaurus.

== Correlation ==
The Katberg Formation is known to correspond in age with the Sanga do Cabral Formation of the Paraná Basin in southern Brazil.

== See also ==
- List of synapsids
- List of fossiliferous stratigraphic units in South Africa
