= Ruhuhuaria =

Ruhuhuaria Temporal range: Middle Triassic

Scientific classification
- Domain: Eukaryota
- Kingdom: Animalia
- Phylum: Chordata
- Clade: †Parareptilia
- Order: †Procolophonomorpha
- Family: †Owenettidae
- Genus: †Ruhuhuaria; Tsuji et al., 2013

Type species
- †Ruhuhuaria reiszi Tsuji et al., 2013

Extinct genus of reptiles

Ruhuhuaria is an extinct genus of owenettid procolophonoid reptile known from the Middle Triassic Manda Beds of southwestern Tanzania. Ruhuhuaria is known solely from the holotype CAMZM T997, poorly preserved but complete skull and mandible recently re-discovered in the collections of the Cambridge Museum of Zoology. It was collected by the English paleontologist Francis Rex Parrington in the early 1930s from the Lifua Member of Manda Beds of the Ruhuhu Basin in Songea Urban District of southwestern Tanzania, which dates back to the late Anisian stage of the Middle Triassic. Ruhuhuaria was first described and named by Linda Akiko Tsuji, Gabriela Sobral and Johannes Müller in 2013 and the type species is Ruhuhuaria reiszi. The generic name is derived from the name of the Ruhuhu Basin. The specific name, reiszi, honors the Canadian paleontologist Robert R. Reisz.

== Phylogeny ==
Due to the poor preservation of the holotype, the phylogenetic position of Ruhuhuaria within Owenettidae is uncertain. Ruhuhuaria being the second youngest owenettid to date, supports the persistence of owenettids into the Middle Triassic and their coexistence with procolophonids.

Ruhuhuaria in a cladogram from Tsuji et al., 2013:

- Procolophonoidea
  - Owenettidae
    - - Barasaurus
      - Owenetta rubidgei
    - Saurodektes
    - - "Owenetta" kitchingorum
      - Candelaria
    - Ruhuhuaria
  - Procolophonidae
