= Balfour Formation =

Geological formation in the Beaufort Group of South Africa

- Stratigraphic range: Lopingian - Induan; 256.3–251.2 Ma
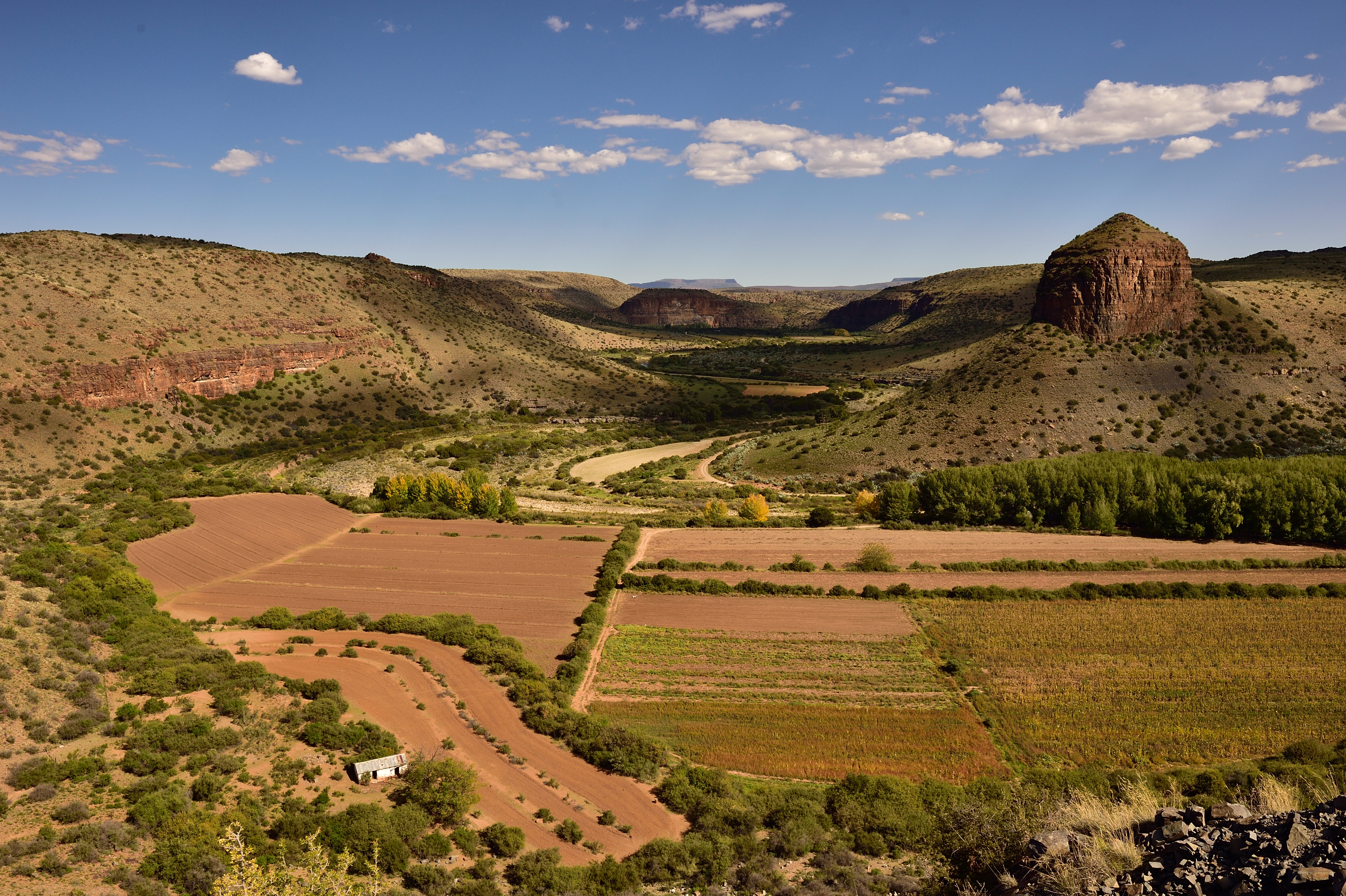
- Outcrops of the Balfour Formation are found in the hillsides surrounding Nieu-Bethesda, Eastern Cape, South Africa
- Type: Geological formation
- Unit of: Adelaide Subgroup, Beaufort Group
- Sub-units: Oudeberg Member, Daggaboersnek Member, Ripplemead Member, Elandsberg Member, Palingkloof Member
- Underlies: Katberg Formation
- Overlies: Middleton Formation
- Thickness: up to 2,150 m (7,050 ft)

Lithology
- Primary: Mudstone, siltstone
- Other: Sandstone

Location
- Coordinates: 32.3°S 24.5°E
- Approximate paleocoordinates: 62.7°S 29.3°W
- Region: Northern Cape, Eastern Cape and Free State
- Country: South Africa
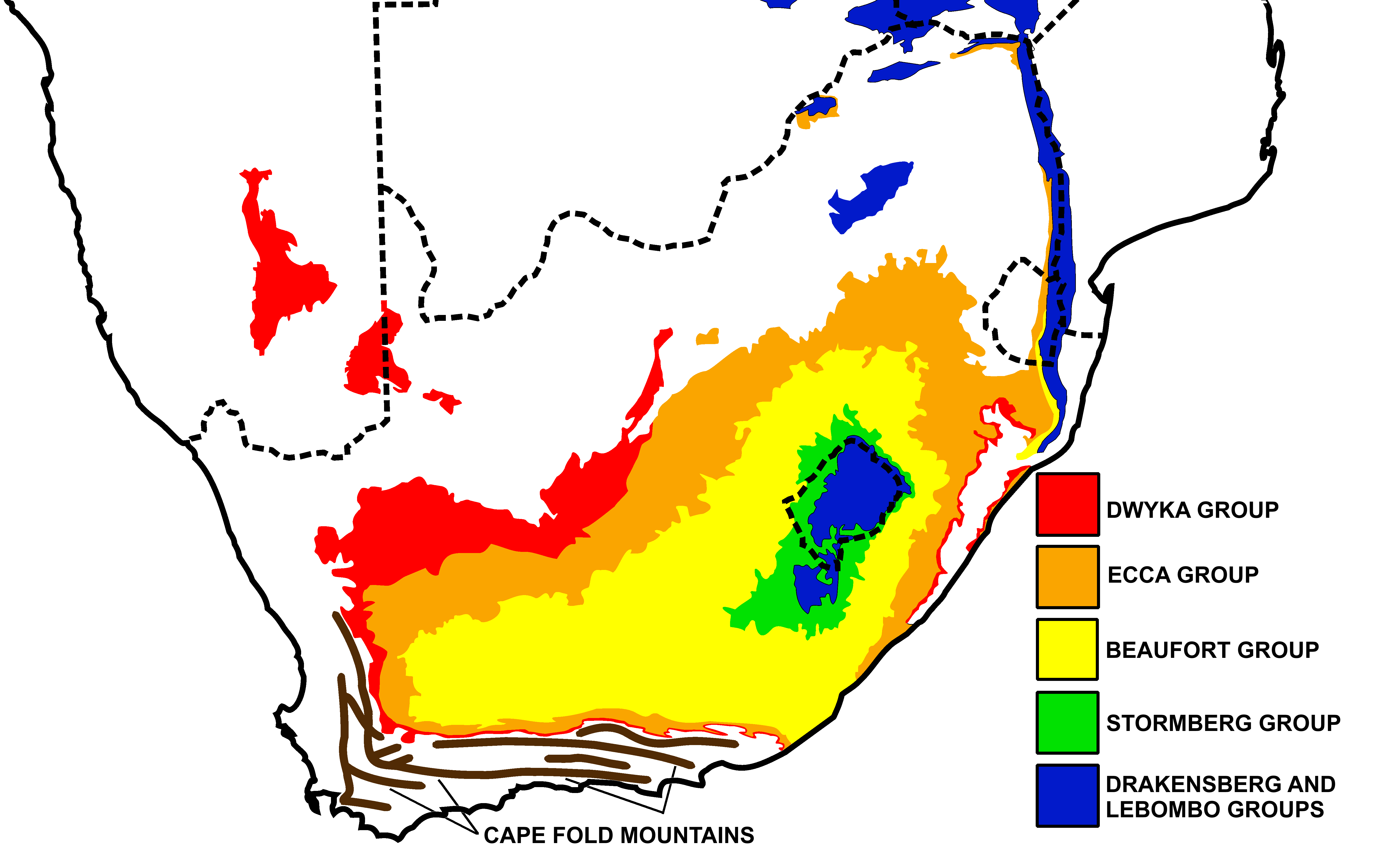

The Balfour Formation is a geological formation that is found in the Beaufort Group, a major geological group that forms part of the greater Karoo Supergroup in South Africa. The Balfour Formation is the uppermost formation of the Adelaide Subgroup which contains all the Late Permian - Early Triassic aged biozones of the Beaufort Group. Outcrops and exposures of the Balfour Formation are found from east of 24 degrees in the highest mountainous escarpments between Beaufort West and Fraserburg, but most notably in the Winterberg and Sneeuberg mountain ranges near Cradock, the Baviaanskloof river valley, Graaff-Reniet and Nieu Bethesda in the Eastern Cape, and in the southern Free State province.

== Geology ==
The Balfour Formation overlies the Middleton Formation of the Adelaide Subgroup and underlies the Katberg Formation of the lower Tarkastad Subgroup, all comprising the greater Beaufort Group. The Balfour Formation is composed of five members which are listed below (from oldest to youngest):

- Oudeberg Member
- Daggaboersnek Member
- Ripplemead Member
- Elandsberg Member
- Palingkloof member

The rocks of the Balfour Formation also incorporate the entire Daptocephalus Assemblage Zone, the lowermost portion of the Lystrosaurus Assemblage Zone, and the uppermost rocks of the Cistecephalus Assemblage Zone. Up until the middle section of the Ripplemead Member, the Balfour Formation correlates with the near contemporaneous Teekloof Formation west of the 24 degrees from Beaufort West westwards, and to the Normadien Formation north of the Orange River. However, the Elandsberg and Palingkloof Members do not have any lateral correlates west of 24 degrees. This is either due to past erosion of the upper, unknown members of the Teekloof Formation or there was a sudden cessation of sedimentary deposition in the western section of the Karoo Basin.

The sedimentary rocks of this formation are composed predominantly of alternating greenish-grey, bluish-grey, and grey-ish red mudstone that often contain siltstone lenses. The mudstones are very fine-grained, massive and exhibit blocky weathering. Claystone successions are also found which, along with the mudstones, frequently contain desiccation cracks, raindrop impressions, and calcareous nodules or concretions are found throughout. Rhythmites are also found. Sandstones are less common, but some notable units have been studied in the Balfour Formation. In the lowermost section of the Balfour is a sandstone-rich unit known as the Oudeberg Member. The sandstones in this unit are very fine-grained and are rich in feldspar. Another sandstone unit in the middle of the Balfour Formation is the Daggaboersnek Member which contains thin, tabular sandstones, and ripple structures are common.

The presence of these rocks reveal much about the past environment that they were deposited in. The dominance of fine-grained mudstone and less common, fine-grained sandstones indicates that the rock sediments were deposited in a low-energy, fluvial environment, most likely one that had meandering rivers. At the time of sedimentary deposition, the Karoo retroarc foreland system was in an overfilled phase, and purely terrestrial sediments occupied the Karoo Basin at this time. As this formation includes the rocks of both the Cistecephalus, Daptocephalus, Lystrosaurus Assemblage Zones, the Balfour Formation preserves the geological record for the end Permian extinction event. This is important as the end Permian extinction event was the largest mass extinction event in the Earth's history. This was followed by one of the worst biotic crises, which is reflected in the sudden and drastic sedimentary facies changes in the overlying Katberg Formation.

== Paleontology ==
Where the Balfour Formation deposits correlate with the Daptocephalus Assemblage Zone, a great diversity of vertebrate fauna are found. This richness in species diversity observed in the Balfour Formation is especially true of dicynodonts as numerous different species of this successful, herbivorous therapsid have been recovered. Various species of burnetiamorph biarmosuchians, rubidgeine gorgonopsians, and therocephalian species such as Moschorhinus kitchingi and the earliest cynodont, Charassognathus gracilis, also appear. Parareptile species, namely captorhinids, the Younginiforme Youngina capensis, and a variety of temnospondyl amphibians, fishes, and plant fossils such as Glossopteris are likewise found. Glossopteris fossils or leaf impressions are particularly common in the Daggaboersnek Member. The uppermost unit of the Balfour Formation marks the Permian-aged side of the Permian-Triassic boundary. At this point in the biostratigraphy there is a marked drop in species diversity as the Permian-Triassic extinction event began to take its course at the time of sediment deposition.

== Paleofauna ==
=== Reptiles ===
==== Diapsids ====
Genus	Species	Locality	Stratigraphic position	Time	Material	Notes	Images
Youngina	Y. capensis	Klipplaat, Doornplaas, Toverwater, Beeldhouersfortien, and Wellwood.	Lower DAZ	Lopingian		A diapsid reptile.	

==== Parareptiles ====
Genus	Species	Locality	Stratigraphic position	Time	Material	Notes	Images
Anthodon	A. serrarius		Lower DAZ	Changhsingian		A pareiasaur.	
Milleropsis	M. pricei		Lower DAZ	Changhsingian		A millerettid parareptile.	
Milleretta	M. rubidgei		Lower DAZ.	Changhsingian		A millerettid parareptile.	
Millerosaurus	M. nuffieldi		Lower DAZ	Changhsingian		A millerettid parareptile.	
Pareiasaurus	P. serridens		Lower and Upper DAZ	Wuchiapingian and Changhsingian.		A pareiasaur.	
Owenetta	O. rubidgei		Lower and Upper DAZ	Wuchiapingian and Changhsingian		A procolophonian parareptile.	
Sauropareion	S. anoplus	Middleberg and Barendskraal Farm.	.Lystrosaurus decivis Assemblage Zone	Induan.		A basal procolophonid parareptile.	

==== Proterosuchids ====
Genus	Species	Locality	Stratigraphic position	Time	Material	Notes	Images
Proterosuchus	P. fergusi	Barendskraal farm and Middleburg.	Lystrosaurus assemblage zone.	Changhsingian.	A complete skull.	A proterosuchidae reptile.	

=== Synapsids ===
==== Therapsids ====
===== Cynodonts =====
Genus	Species	Locality	Stratigraphic position	Time	Material	Notes	Images
Charassognathus	C. gracilis			Wuchiapingian		A cynodont.	
Cynosaurus	C. suppostus		Cistecephalus and Lower to Upper Daptocephalus Assemblage Zones.	Wuchiapingian - Changhsingian.		A cynodont.	
Procynosuchus	P. delaharpeae	New Bathsheba.		Wuchiapingian		A cynodont.	
Progalesaurus	P. lootbergensis	New Lootsberg Pass.	Lystrosaurus Assemblage Zone.	Lopingian	A skull, dentition, and postcranial skeleton.	A cynodont.	
Vetusodon	V. elikhulu	Enyezane.	Upper DAZ	Lopingian	A partial skull	A cynodont.	

===== Dicynodonts =====
Genus	Species	Locality	Stratigraphic position	Time	Material	Notes	Images
Daptocephalus	D. leoniceps		Lower to Upper DAZ.	Changhsingian		A dicynodont.	
Dolomitipes	D. accordii					A dicynodont.	
Dolomitipes	D. icelsi					A dicynodont.	
Dicynodontoides	D. recurvidens	Nooitgedacht 68.	Lower to Upper DAZ		A skull and postcranial element.	A dicynodont.	
Emydops	E. arctatus					A dicynodont.	
Lystrosaurus	L. curvatus	Nooitgedacht 68 and Fairydale.	Upper DAZ	Induan.	A skull.	A dicynodont.	Lystrosaurus
Lystrosaurus	L. declivis	Nooitgedacht 68 and Fairydale.	Lystrosaurus Declivis Assemblage Zone	Induan.	A skull and a complete skeleton.	A dicynodont.	Lystrosaurus
Lystrosaurus	L. maccaigi	Nooitgedacht 68 and Fairydale.	Upper DAZ	Changhsingian.		A dicynodont.	Lystrosaurus
Lystrosaurus	L. murrayi	Nooitgedacht 68 and Fairydale.	lower part of Palingkloof Member, Lystrosaurus Assemblage Zone.	Induan.	A skull and skeleton.	A dicynodont.	Lystrosaurus
Oudenodon	O. bainii		Lower to Upper DAZ			A small dicynodont.	

===== Gorgonopsids =====
Genus	Species	Locality	Stratigraphic position	Time	Material	Notes	Images
Aloposaurus	A. tenuis			Lopingian		A gorgonopsid.	Alopsaurus
Cyonosaurus	C. kitchingi			Lopingian		A gorgonopsid.	
Cyonosaurus	C. longiceps		Lower to Upper DAZ	Lopingian		A gorgonopsid.	
Dinogorgon	D. rubidgei		Cistecephalus and Daptocephalus assemblage.	Lopingian		A gorgonopsid.	
Inostrancevia	I. africana	lower slope of the hill, Loskop, Nooitgedacht 68.	Upper DAZ	Lopingian	A partial skeleton including a complete skull and occluded mandible, the entirety of the precaudal axial column, partial scapulae, partial right pelvis, the right femur, and a disarticulated left humerus, ulna, radius, and tibia.	A predatory inostranceviinae gorgonopsid.	
Leontosaurus	L. vanderhorsti		Lower DAZ	Lopingian		A gorgonopsid.	
Lycaenops	L. ornatus		Lower DAZ	Guadalupian		A gorgonopsid.	
Paragalerhinus	P. rubidgei	Wellwood	Dicynodon Assemblage Zone.		A partial skull.	A gorgonopsid.	
Rubidgea	R. atrox		Lower DAZ.	Lopingian		A gorgonopsid.	
Scylacops	S. capensis		Lower DAZ	Lopingian		A gorgonopsid.	

===== Therocephalians =====
Genus	Species	Locality	Assemblage Zone	Time	Material	Notes	Images
Cradognathus	C. albanensis	Unknown part from the Chris Hani District Municipality	Cistecephalus assemblage Zone	Changhsingian	A partial skull with an occluded partial lower jaw that misses the portions posterior to the orbit.	An akidnognathid therocephalian.	Moschorhinus Theriognathus Tetracynodon
Ictidochampsa	I. platyceps	New Bethesda Commonage	Lower DAZ	Wuchiapingian/Changhsingian		A whaitsiidae therocephalian.	Moschorhinus Theriognathus Tetracynodon
Ictidosuchoides	I. intermedius		Upper DAZ			A therocephalian.	Moschorhinus Theriognathus Tetracynodon
Ictidosuchops	I. intermedius			Induan		A therocephalian.	Moschorhinus Theriognathus Tetracynodon
Moschorhinus	M. kitchingi	Spitskop, Nooitgedacht 68.	Upper DAZ		A weathered skull along with a complete skull, partially articulated anterior skeleton, and disarticulated pelvis and hind limb.	A therocephalian	Moschorhinus Theriognathus Tetracynodon
Notaelurodon	N. kitchingi	New Bethesda Commonage	Dicynodon Assemblage Zone	Wuchiapingian	A specimen	A therocephalian.	Moschorhinus Theriognathus Tetracynodon
Olivierosuchus	O. parringtoni	Palingkloof Member	Lystrosaurus assemblege zone.	Induan	A complete skull and anterior half of skeleton in articulation, including vertebrae, ribs, pectoral girdle, partial left humerus, and complete right forelimb, including terminal phalanges.	A therocephalian.	Moschorhinus Theriognathus Tetracynodon
Promoschorhynchus	P. platyrhinus			Wuchiapingian/Induan		A therocephalian.	Moschorhinus Theriognathus Tetracynodon
Theriognathus	T. microps					A therocephalian.	Moschorhinus Theriognathus Tetracynodon
Tetracynodon	T. tenuis					A therocephalian.	Moschorhinus Theriognathus Tetracynodon

== Correlation ==
The Balfour Formation is known to corresponds in age with the Cis-Uralian fauna of Russia and the Sanga do Cabral Formation, Paraná Basin of Brazil. Correlations with other Late Permian - Early Triassic deposits abroad remain inconclusive.
