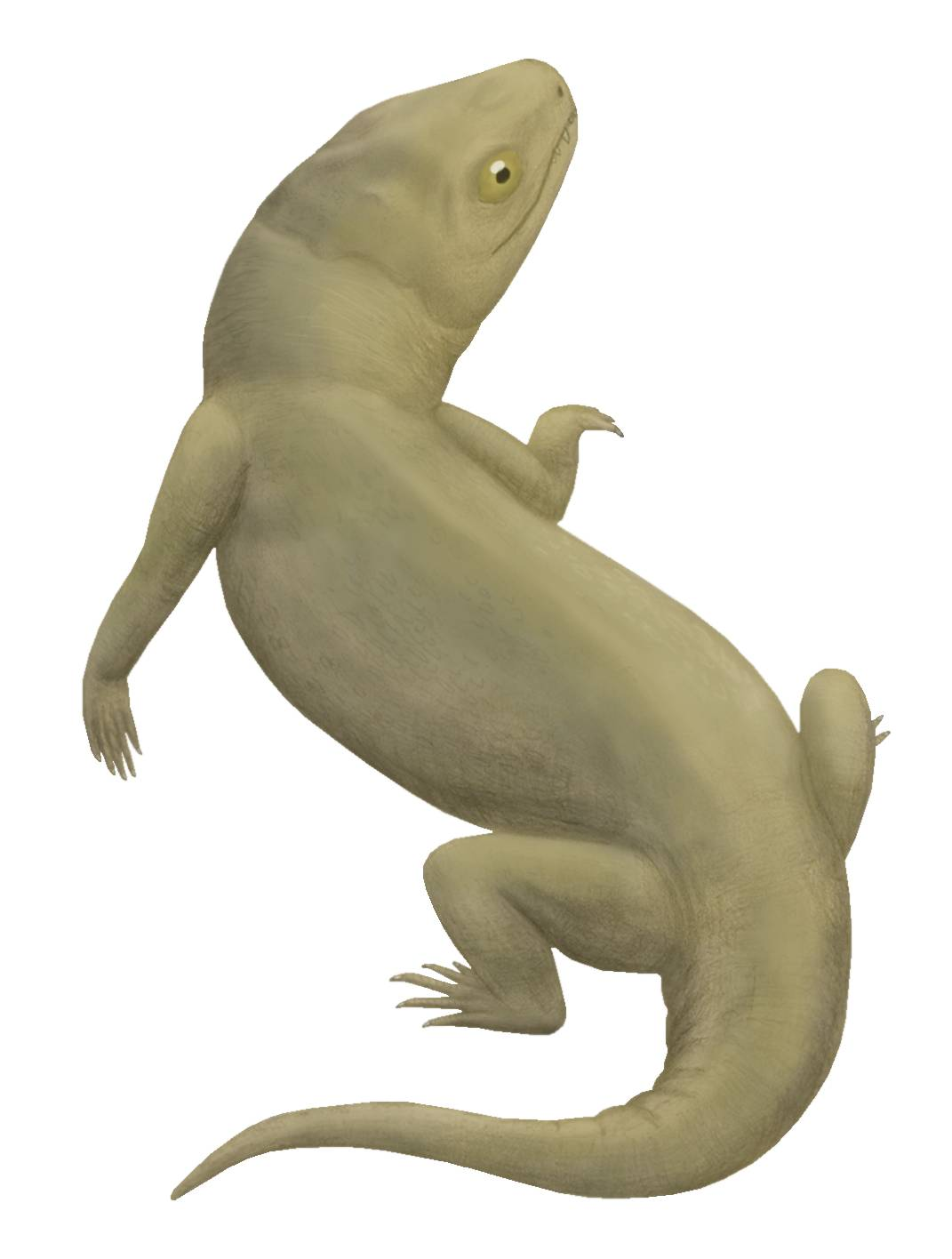
- Saurodektes kitchingorum

Scientific classification
- Kingdom: Animalia
- Phylum: Chordata
- Class: Reptilia
- Superfamily: †Procolophonoidea
- Family: †Owenettidae; Broom, 1939

Genera
- Barasaurus; Candelaria; Owenetta; Ruhuhuaria; Saurodektes

= Owenettidae =

Owenettids Temporal range: 260.5–232 Ma Late Capitanian - Mid Carnian

Extinct family of reptiles

Owenettidae is an extinct family of procolophonian stem-reptiles. Fossils have been found primarily from Africa and Madagascar, with one genus present from South America. It is the sister taxon to the family Procolophonidae. Modesto and Damiani (2007) defined Owenettidae as a stem-based group including Owenetta rubidgei and all species closely related to it than to Procolophon trigoniceps.

== Distribution ==
The family was constructed in 1939 for the type genus Owenetta. Since then several other genera have been assigned to Owenettidae, including Barasaurus and Saurodektes. The oldest known owenettid, Owenetta rubidgei, dates back to the Wuchiapingian stage of the Late Permian. It and Saurodektes, have been found from the Beaufort Group in the Karoo Basin of South Africa, while Barasaurus is known from the Late Permian and the Early Triassic of Sakamena Group in Madagascar. These strata span the Permo-Triassic boundary and provide evidence for the great faunal change that occurred as a result of the Permian–Triassic extinction event. Although most owenettids lived during the Permian, remains of some taxa such as Saurodektes kitchingorum extend the temporal range of the family into the Triassic. The youngest known owenettid is Candelaria from the Santa Maria Formation of Brazil, which lived during the Ladinian stage of the Middle Triassic. The second youngest known owenettid, Ruhuhuaria, is known from the late Anisian Manda Beds of southwestern Tanzania.

== Description ==
Owenettids were relatively small procolophonians that possessed broad heads and robust bodies. The family shares several synapomorphies that separate it from other related procolophonomorphs. The absence of an entepicondylar foramen is diagnostic to all members from which the humerus is known. In regards to cranial anatomy, there is no contact between the postorbital and parietal bones as a result of enlarged postfrontal bones, and the skull table is formed partly from large supratemporals lateral to the parietal bones.

== Phylogeny ==
Owenettidae in a cladogram from Tsuji et al., 2013:

- Procolophonoidea
  - Owenettidae
    - - Barasaurus
      - Owenetta rubidgei
    - Saurodektes
    - - "Owenetta" kitchingorum
      - Candelaria
    - Ruhuhuaria
  - Procolophonidae

Maisch (2025) suggests that ichthyosaurs may have derived from owenettids or be very close relatives of them, as he argues they share numerous characteristics more closely than the previous neodiapsid hypothesis.
