= Manda Formation =

Geologic formation in Tanzania

- Stratigraphic range: Anisian? - Carnian?
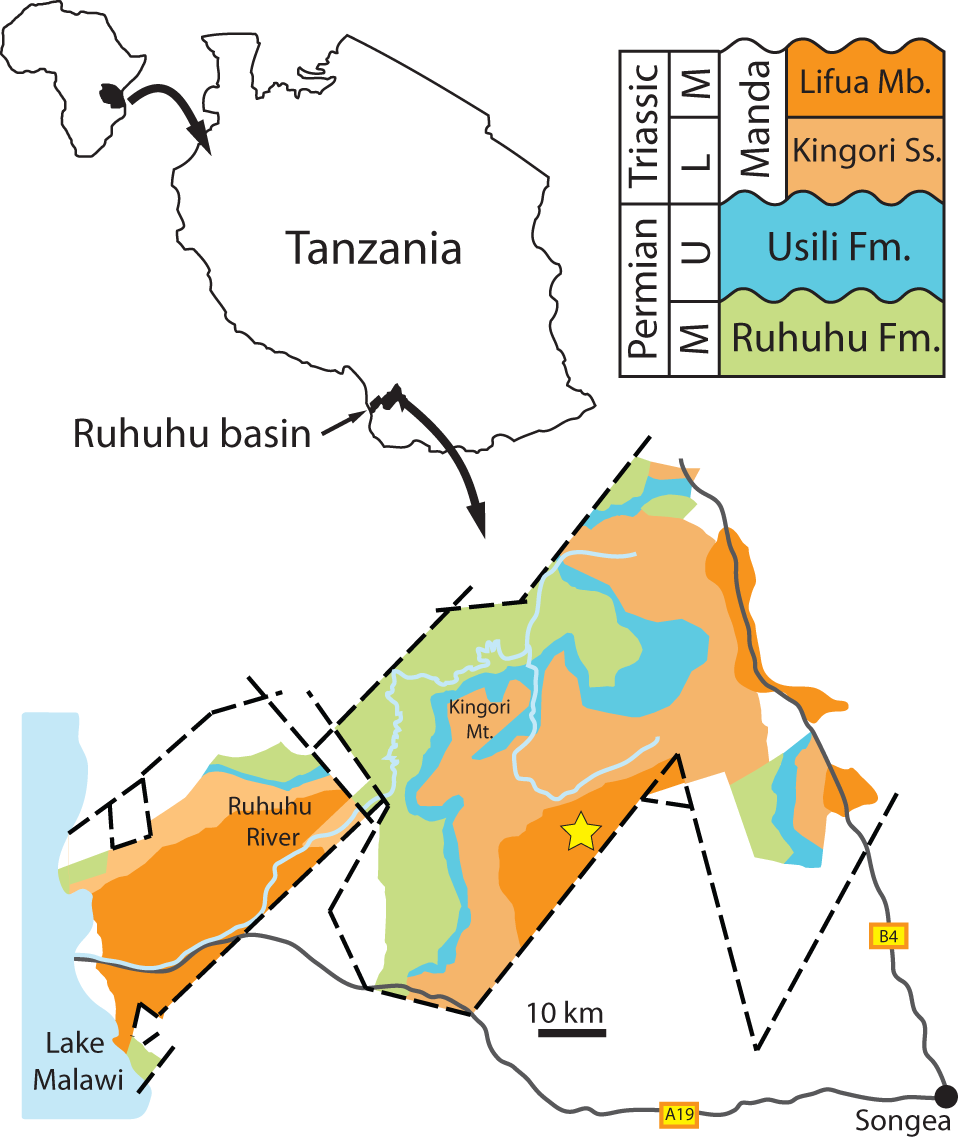
- Map of the outcropping Manda Formation
- Type: Geological formation
- Unit of: Songea Group
- Sub-units: Kingori Sandstone Member, Lifua Member
- Underlies: None
- Overlies: Usili Formation

Lithology
- Primary: Sandstone
- Other: Mudstone, siltstone, marl

Location
- Coordinates: 10.3°S 35.2°E
- Approximate paleocoordinates: 53.7°S 23.0°E
- Region: Iringa & Ruvuma Regions
- Country: Tanzania
- Extent: Ruhuhu Basin
- Manda Formation (Tanzania)

The Manda Formation (also known as the Manda Beds) is a Middle Triassic (Anisian? or Ladinian) or Late Triassic (earliest Carnian?) geologic formation in Tanzania. It preserves fossils of many terrestrial vertebrates from the Triassic, including some of the earliest dinosauromorph archosaurs.

The formation was historically considered to be from the Anisian (first stage of the Middle Triassic), as it shares some fauna with the Cynognathus Assemblage Zone of South Africa. Many recent studies cast doubt on this age, suggesting that parts of it may be more recent, potentially as young the early Carnian (first stage of the Late Triassic). The dicynodont Dinodontosaurus is known from this formation as well as formations in South America which are directly dated to the late Ladinian (last stage of the Middle Triassic) and early Carnian.

== History of study ==
One of the first to study rocks of the Manda Formation was British geologist G. M. Stockley. In 1932, Stockley explored the geology of the Ruhuhu Basin in Tanzania. He called a series of layers dating from the Late Carboniferous to the Middle Triassic the Songea Series and divided it into eight units labelled K1-K8. Stockley was also the first to describe fossils from these rocks, naming an older layer the "Lower Bone Bed" and a younger layer the "Upper Bone Bed".

In 1957, paleontologist Alan J. Charig described many more fossils from the bone beds in his Ph.D. thesis for the University of Cambridge. Charig renamed the youngest of Stockley's units in 1963, calling unit K6 the Kawinga Formation, K7 the Kingori Sandstones, and K8 the Manda Formation. Fossils were identified in many strata, invalidating Stockley's division into two distinct bone beds. Since Charig's description, the Kawinga Formation has been renamed the Usili Formation, the Kingori Sandstones have become the Kingori Sandstone Member of the Manda Formation, and Charig's original Manda Formation has become a subunit of the formation called the Lifua Member. Six formations and one informal unit are currently recognized in the Songea Group (Ruhuhu basin) rocks range in age from Pennsylvanian to Anisian, including the Idusi (K1), Mchuchuma (K2), Mbuyura (K3), Mhukuru (K4), Ruhuhu (K5), and Usili (K6) formations and the informal Manda Beds, which include the Kingori Sandstone (K7) and Lifua Member (K8).

== Age and correlations ==
The upper Manda Beds have been assigned to the Perovkan LVF based on reports that Eryosuchus, Shansiodon, Angonisaurus, and Scalenodon were present. Angonisaurus does seem to tie the Manda Beds to subzone C of the Cynognathus Assemblage Zone in the Karoo Basin. However, the relations of the other Tanzanian taxa are more ambiguous. Purported Tanzanian "Eryosuchus" and "Shansiodon" specimens likely represent new genera unrelated to their supposed namesakes, while Scalenodon may be endemic to Africa due to the uncertain relations of non-African "Scalenodon" species. One Upper Manda cynodont, Aleodon, has also been found in the Dinodontosaurus assemblage zone of the Santa Maria Formation in Brazil.

== Paleoenvironment ==
The Lifua Member sandstone was deposited by rivers. Meandering, probably sandy rivers were present. In the middle to upper Lifua bone accumulations, evidence suggests "that ponds and springs were a much more common occurrence on the Ruhuhu Basin floodplains at this time than before or after"; the local climate likely became warmer and wetter then. The increase in water would have promoted perennial vegetation, which became diversity hotspots for tetrapods, resulting in more bones being deposited here.

== Paleobiota ==
=== Invertebrates ===
Color key: Taxon / Reclassified taxon / Taxon falsely reported as present / Dubious taxon or junior synonym / Ichnotaxon / Ootaxon / Morphotaxon

Notes
Uncertain or tentative taxa are in small text
~~crossed out~~ taxa are discredited.

Taxon	Species	Member	Material	Notes	Images
?Tihkia	?T. karrooensis	Lifua	Articulated specimens	A freshwater bivalve, originally named as Unio karrooensis. Also known from the Ntawere Formation.	

=== Tetrapods ===
Color key: Taxon / Reclassified taxon / Taxon falsely reported as present / Dubious taxon or junior synonym / Ichnotaxon / Ootaxon / Morphotaxon

Notes
Uncertain or tentative taxa are in small text
~~crossed out~~ taxa are discredited.

==== Temnospondyls ====
Taxon	Species	Member	Material	Notes	Images
Stanocephalosaurus	S. pronus	Lifua		Remains of a temnospondyl amphibian previously referred either to Parotosuchus or Eryosuchus	

==== Parareptiles ====
Taxon	Species	Member	Material	Notes	Images
Ruhuhuaria	R. reiszi	Lifua	CAMZM T997, poorly preserved but complete skull and mandible	An owenettid	

==== Archosauromorphs ====
Taxon	Species	Member	Material	Notes	Images
Asperoris	A. mnyama	Lifua	NHMUK PV R36615, incomplete skull	A non-crurotarsan archosauriform of uncertain phylogenetic placement	
"Stagonosuchus"	"S." tanganyikaensis	Lifua Member	SAM 11754, right humerus	An indeterminate archosauromorph; possibly a rhynchosaur unrelated to Stagonosuchus nyassicus.	
Stenaulorhynchus	S. stockleyi	Lifua		A rhynchosaur	
Unnamed Archosauromorph	Indeterminate.	Lifua	NHMUK PV R36619, incomplete skull and partial postcranial skeleton	A non-archosaurian archosauriform	

===== Archosaurs =====
Taxon	Species	Member	Material	Notes	Images
Asilisaurus	A. kongwe	Lifua	Several holotype specimens consist of a well-preserved, articulated partial skeleton and dentary	A silesaurid dinosauriform	
Hypselorhachis	H. mirabilis	Lifua	NHMUK R16586, a complete dorsal vertebra	A sail-backed archosaur possibly belonging to the family Ctenosauriscidae	
Mambawakale	M. ruhuhu	Lifua	NHMUK R36620, partial skull and some postcranial fragments	A paracrocodylomorph; previously informally known as "Pallisteria angustimentum".	
Mandasuchus	M. tanyauchen	Lifua	NHMUK R6792, partial mandible and postcranial skeletons	A paracrocodylomorph	
Nundasuchus	N. songeaensis	Lifua	NMT RB48, partial skeleton and skull	A pseudosuchian of uncertain affinities, possibly a suchian	
Nyasasaurus	N. parringtoni	Lifua	NHMUK R6856, a right humerus, three partial presacral vertebrae and three sacral vertebrae. SAM-PK-K10654 is also potentially referable - see "Thecodontosaurus" alophos below.	A fragmentary dinosauriform. Possibly the oldest dinosaur (as a theropod or an ornithischian) or a non-dinosaurian dinosauriform.	
Stagonosuchus	S. nyassicus	Lifua	Two individuals of different sizes mostly preserving postcranial elements	A large loricatan closely related to Prestosuchus, and sometimes considered a species within that genus.	
Teleocrater	T. rhadinus	Lifua	NHMUK R6795, vertebrae, limb bones and other elements. Additional material referred from two other individuals.	An early avemetatarsalian in the group Aphanosauria.	
"Thecodontosaurus"	"T." alophos	Lifua	SAM-PK-K10654, three neck vertebrae and two rear presacral vertebrae	A probable subjective senior synonym of Nyasasaurus, initially identified as a sauropodomorph dinosaur.	
Unnamed archosaur	Unidentified.	Lifua	Nearly complete skull and partial skeleton	A close relative of aetosaurs	

==== Therapsids ====
===== Dicynodonts =====
Taxon	Species	Member	Material	Notes	Images
Angonisaurus	A. cruickshanki	Lifua		A kannemeyeriiform	
Dinodontosaurus	D. isayavamanda	Lifua	Two partial skulls and associated postcrania	A kannemereriiform	
Kannemeyeria	K. simocephalus	Lifua		A kannemeyeriid kannemeyeriiform	
Sangusaurus	S. parringtonii	Lifua		A stahleckeriid kannemeyeriiform	
Shansiodon	Indeterminate	Lifua	Skull	A shansiodontid kannemeyeriiform	
Tetragonias	T. njalilus	Lifua		A shansiodontid kannemeyeriiform	

===== Cynodonts =====
Taxon	Species	Member	Material	Notes	Images
Aleodon	A. brachyrhamphus	Lifua		A possible chiniquodontid	
Cricodon	C. metabolus	Lifua		A trirachodontid	
Cynognathus	C. crateronotus	Lifua		A cynognathid	
Diademodon	D. tetragonas	Lifua		A diademodontid	
Scalenodon	S. angustifrons	Lifua		A traversodontid	
Scalenodon	S? attridgei	Lifua		A traversodontid; may fall outside the genus Scalenodon and may be a synonym of "Scalenodon" charigi	
Scalenodon	S? charigi	Lifua		A traversodontid; may fall outside the genus Scalenodon	
Mandagomphodon	M. hirschoni	Lifua		A traversodontid; originally classified in the genus Scalenodon; named after the Manda Beds	

== See also ==
- Geology of Tanzania
- Beaufort Group
- Omingonde Formation
