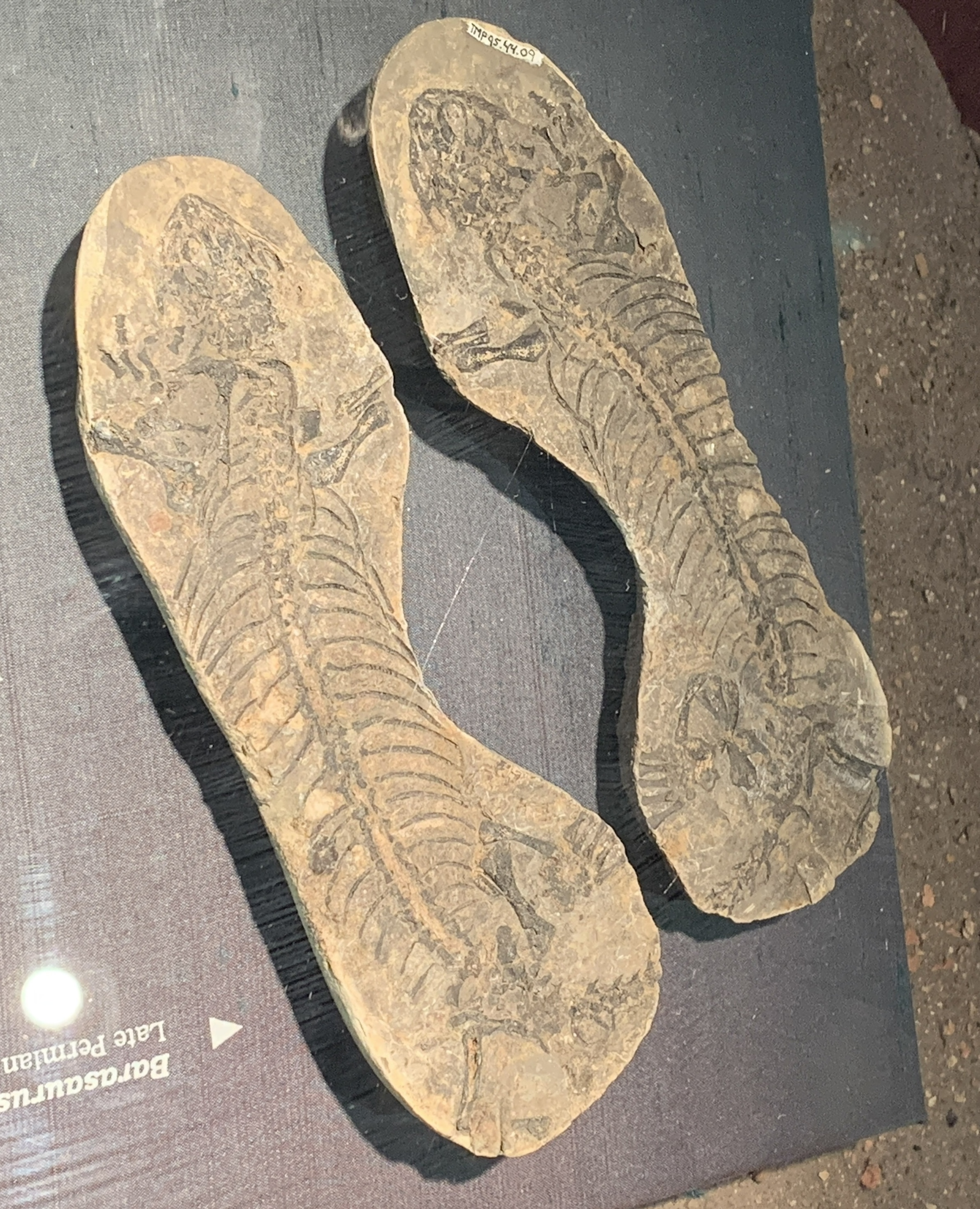

Scientific classification
- Domain: Eukaryota
- Kingdom: Animalia
- Phylum: Chordata
- Clade: †Parareptilia
- Order: †Procolophonomorpha
- Family: †Owenettidae
- Genus: †Barasaurus; Piveteau, 1955

Type species
- †Barasaurus besairiei Piveteau, 1955

= Barasaurus =

Barasaurus Temporal range: Late Permian - Early Triassic, Lopingian–Induan

Extinct genus of reptiles

Barasaurus is an extinct genus of owenettid procolophonoid parareptile known from the Late Permian and Early Triassic of Madagascar. It contains a single species, Barasaurus besairiei.

== Discovery ==
Barasaurus besairiei, the type species of the Barasaurus, was first described and named by the French paleontologist Jean Piveteau in 1955 on the basis of the holotype MNHN P1, a natural mold of a nearly complete skeleton, missing only the tail and distal limb reposited in the Muséum national d'Histoire naturelle, Paris. The holotype was collected from the Lower Sakamena Formation of the Sakamena Group at the Ranohira locality of Morondava Basin, Fianarantsoa, dating to the Lopingian stage of the late Late Permian period. The generic name honors the Bara people, indigenous to the Ranohira region of Madagascar, and is derived from sauros, meaning "lizard" in Ancient Greek. The specific name, besairiei, honors Henri Michel-Edouard Besairie, a French geologist who supervised the Geological Survey of Madagascar and collected the holotype specimen.

Hilary F. Ketchum and Paul M. Barrett (2004) referred additional specimens from the Sakamena Group to Barasaurus. They described four specimens, consisting of hind limb material: OUMNH GX.95, a foot including the tarsus and digits; OUMNH GX.97, left femur, possible tibia and foot; OUMNH GX.99, right tibia, fibula, and foot; and OUMNH GX.101, a foot. These specimens are housed at the Oxford University Museum of Natural History. They were collected from the "Couches à Poissons et Ammonites" Member of the Middle Sakamena Formation at the only currently known amniote locality of the Diego Basin, Antsiranana of northwestern Madagascar, dating to the Induan stage of the early Early Triassic period.

== Description ==
Several traits suggest that the lower Triassic and upper Permian specimens are referable to Barasaurus. The presence of a fused astragalocalcaneum indicate that they belong to the Procolophonia. Among parareptiles, only specimens of Barasaurus and the millerettid Broomia possess a fifth distal tarsal, a reversal to the primitive amniote condition. This trait is considered an autapomorphy of both genera separately, as Broomia is easily distinguished from Barasaurus on the basis of several other characters and its phylogenetic position within Parareptilia. All specimens of Barasaurus as well as Procolophon share the presence of the medial flange on the proximal end of the first metatarsal, a possible synapomorphy for Procolophonoidea. All specimens of Barasaurus are distinguished from all other procolophonians by the presence of a pedal centrale and relatively short pedal unguals, and therefore these represent two additional autapomorphic reversals of Barasaurus.

Although the complete pedal phalangeal count of Barasaurus is unknown from the holotype, the lower Triassic material revealed that the phalangeal formula for this genus is 2:3:4:5:5. Procolophonoid material with such arrangement is otherwise known from the Lower Sakamena Formation. These specimens are also similar to Owenetta, and therefore likely referable to Barasaurus as well. The presence of five phalanges in the fifth pedal digit (as seen in the phalangeal formula) is unique among amniotes to Barasaurus and mesosaurs, however their feet are easily distinguishable on the basis of other traits, suggesting that this unusual formula represents an additional autapomorphy for Barasaurus.

== Phylogeny ==
Phylogenetic analyses place Barasaurus within the Owenettidae, the sister taxon of Procolophonidae. Barasaurus forms the sister taxon to the clade containing Saurodektes and the only known owenettid older than Barasaurus, Owenetta rubidgei, while "Owenetta" kitchingorum and Candelaria form another lineage within the family. The addition of Ruhuhuaria to the phylogenetic analysis resulted in less resolved relation within Owenettidae, however Barasaurus and Owenetta rubidgei are recovered as sister taxa.
