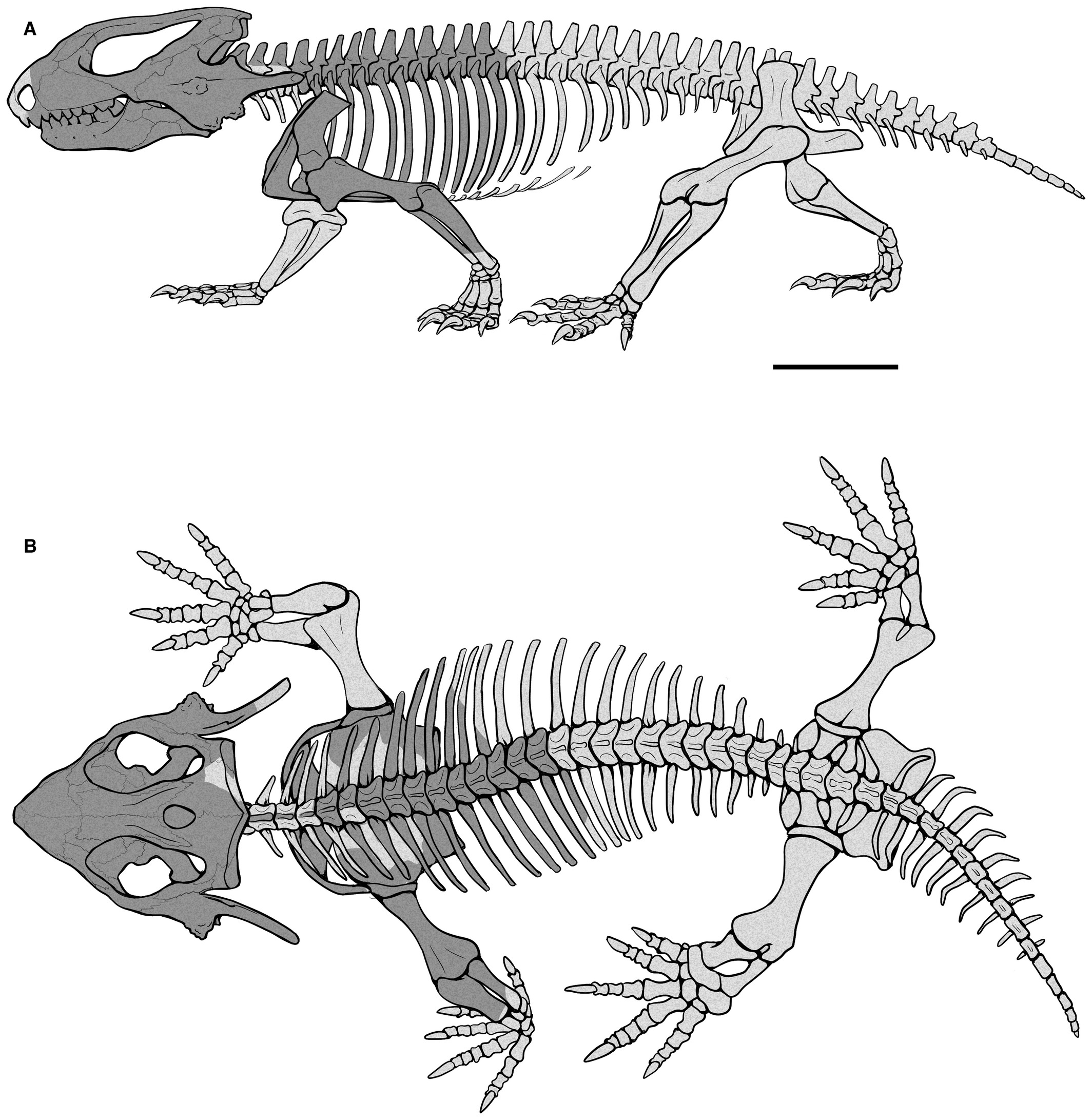
- Skeleton of Kapes bentoni (Procolophonidae)

Scientific classification
- Kingdom: Animalia
- Phylum: Chordata
- Class: Reptilia
- Suborder: †Procolophonia
- Superfamily: †Procolophonoidea; Broom, 1939

Families
- †Owenettidae; †Procolophonidae

Synonyms
- Procolophoniformes De Braga & Rieppel, 1997

= Procolophonoidea =

Procolophonoids Temporal range: Middle Permian–Triassic (middle Wordian–late Rhaetian), 265–201.3 Ma

Extinct superfamily of reptiles

Procolophonoidea is an extinct superfamily of procolophonian stem-reptiles. Members were characteristically small, stocky, and superficially lizard-like in appearance. Fossils have been found worldwide from many continents, including Antarctica. The first members appeared during the Late Permian in the Karoo Basin of South Africa.

== Taxonomy ==
Procolophonoidea includes the families Owenettidae and Procolophonidae. In 1997, De Braga and Rieppel defined this same taxon (the oldest common ancestor of Procolophonidae and Owenettidae and all its descendants) using the name Procolophoniformes.

When the superfamily was constructed in 1956, it was thought to be within the anthracosaur suborder Diadectomorpha. Since then it has been placed within the suborder Procolophonia along with the pareiasaurs, a group of large herbivorous Permian 'parareptiles'.

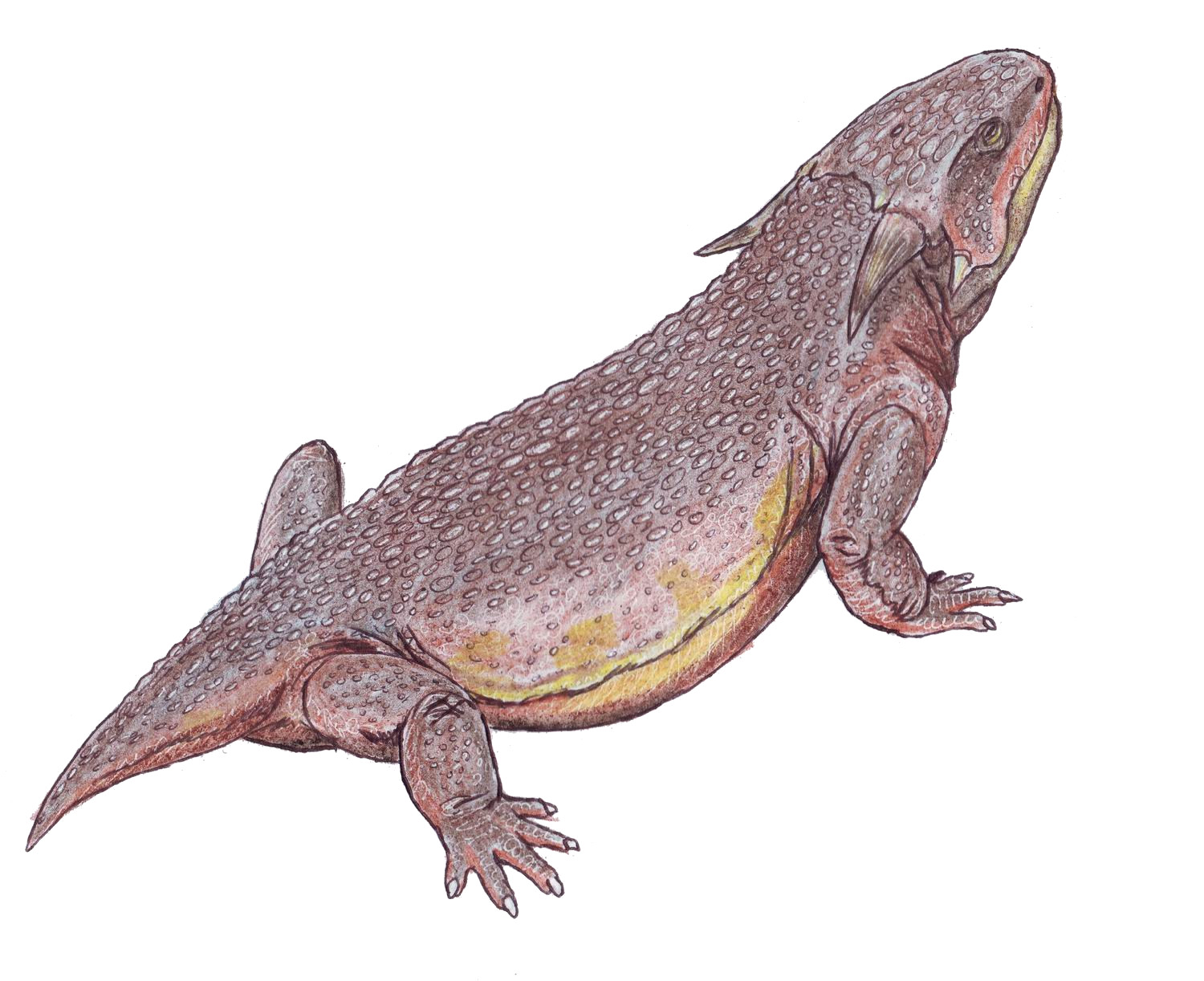
Sclerosaurus armatus

- Procolophonia
  - Procolophonoidea
    - Family Owenettidae
      - Genus Barasaurus
      - Genus Candelaria
      - Genus Owenetta
      - Genus Ruhuhuaria
      - Genus Saurodektes
    - Family Procolophonidae
      - ? Genus Gomphiosauridion
      - ? Genus Kinelia
      - ? Genus Spondylolestes
      - ? Genus Xenodiphyodon
      - Genus Coletta
      - Genus Kitchingnathus
      - Genus Lasasaurus
      - Genus Phaanthosaurus
      - Genus Pintosaurus
      - Genus Sauropareion
      - Genus Tichvinskia
      - Subfamily Leptopleuroninae
      - Subfamily Procolophoninae
      - Subfamily Theledectinae

Cladogram of Procolophonoidea, excluding members of Procolophonidae, from Cisneros et al. (2004).

- †Procolophonoidea
  - Owenettidae
    - - Barasaurus
      - - Owenetta rubidgei
        - Saurodektes
    - - "Owenetta" kitchingorum
      - Candelaria
  - Procolophonidae
    - Coletta
    - - Sauropareion
      - Other procolophonids
