= Caruichthys =

Caruichthys Temporal range: Early Triassic

Scientific classification
- Domain: Eukaryota
- Kingdom: Animalia
- Phylum: Chordata
- Class: Actinopterygii
- Order: †Platysomiformes
- Family: †Platysomidae (?)
- Genus: †Caruichthys; Broom, 1913
- Species: †C. ornatus

Binomial name
- †Caruichthys ornatus Broom, 1913

Extinct genus of fishes

Caruichthys is an extinct genus of prehistoric freshwater ray-finned fish that lived during the Early Triassic epoch. It contains a single species, Caruichthys ornatus, known from what is now South Africa (Cradock District). It is known from a single specimen, which was collected from the middle Beaufort Series (Lystrosaurus Assemblage Zone) of Doorn River.

== See also ==
- Prehistoric fish
- List of prehistoric bony fish
