= Saurodektes =

Saurodektes Temporal range: Early Triassic, Induan

Scientific classification
- Kingdom: Animalia
- Phylum: Chordata
- Class: Reptilia
- Subclass: †Parareptilia
- Order: †Procolophonomorpha
- Family: †Owenettidae
- Genus: †Saurodektes; Modesto et al., 2004

Type species
- †Owenetta kitchingorum Reisz & Scott, 2002

Synonyms
- †Saurodektes rogersorum Modesto et al., 2003

Extinct genus of reptiles

Saurodektes is an extinct genus of owenettid procolophonoid known from the earliest Early Triassic deposits of Eastern Cape Province, South Africa. The genus was named by Sean P. Modesto, Ross J. Damiani, Johann Neveling, and Adam M. Yates in 2003, containing a single species, S. rogersorum. However, this species was based on a specimen nearly identical to "Owenetta" kitchingorum, named the year prior. As such, later researchers synonymized the two species, with S. kitchingorum having priority as the older name.

== History ==
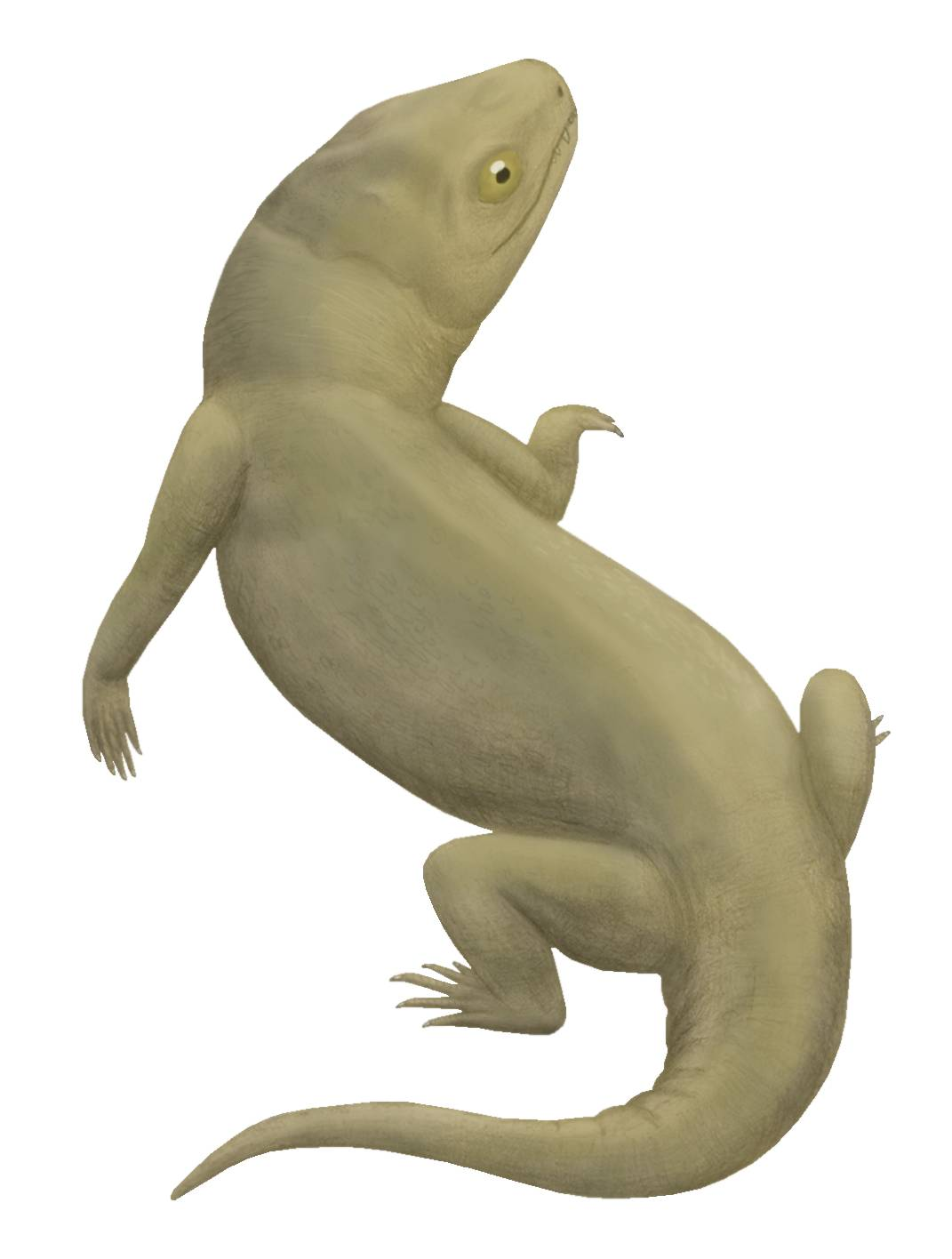
Speculative life restoration

In 2002, Reisz and Scott named Owenetta kitchingorum based on a block preserving two partial, articulated skeletons: an articulated skull and front part of a skeleton (established as the holotype), and a nearly complete postcranium. This specimen was found at Donovan's Kop in Tweefonteinin, in rock outcrops assigned to the Lystrosaurus Assemblage Zone, dating to the early Induan stage of the Early Triassic period.The authors referred the species to Owenetta, an otherwise Permian-restricted genus, suggesting it survived the Permian–Triassic extinction event, extending into the Early Triassic. The specific name, kitchingorum, honors James Kitching, a well-known Karroo fossil collector, and the Kitching family.

Saurodektes (originally Saurodectes) rogersorum was named in 2003 by Modesto and colleagues based on the holotype, BP/1/6025, a partial skull and some fragmentary partial postcranial elements. This specimen is housed at the Bernard Price Institute for Palaeontological Research, although the unprepared specimens BP/1/6044, BP/1/6045, and BP/1/6047 might also be referable to it. All specimens were collected on the slopes of the Manhaar Hill at Barendskraal in the Middelburg District, from the Palingkloof Member of the Balfour Formation, Beaufort Group, only 12 metres below the base of the Katberg Formation. Like the O. kitchingorum specimens, this horizon belongs to the Lystrosaurus Assemblage Zone.

The originally-proposed generic name Saurodectes is preoccupied by Saurodectes Rasnitsyn & Zherikhin, 2000, a fossil chewing lice known from the Early Cretaceous of Russia. Thus, an alternative generic name, Saurodektes, was proposed by Modesto et al. in 2004. The generic name combines the Greek sauros ("lizard") and dektes ("biter"). The specific name, rogersorum, honors Richard and Jenny Rogers, owners of the farm Barendskraal, for their hospitality, support, and interest in the work of the paleontologists who recovered the holotype.

In their initial description of Saurodektes in 2003, a year after O. kitchingorum was named, Modesto and colleagues proposed that "O." kitchingorum should be assigned to its own distinct genus. A 2007 paper also supported this polyphyly.

In 2020, Hamley and colleagues reassessed the validity of "Owenetta" kitchingorum in relation to the coeval Saurodektes. These authors noted that, while Modesto et al. (2003) had interpreted the two as distinct, three traits diagnostic to "O." kitchingorum can not be observed in the fragmentary S. rogersorum skull. Furthermore, one of the characters previously regarded as unique to "O." kitchingorum is also present in Barasaurus. Various traits proposed as diagnostic for S. rogersorum are also present in fossils of "O." kitchingorum. The authors concluded that "O." kitchingorum and S. rogersorum are effectively indistinguishable. Since "O." kitchingorum is significantly distinct from O. rubidgei, the type species of Owenetta, and thus not referable to this genus, the authors transferred it to the genus Saurodektes. However, since it is identical to S. rogersorum and "O." kitchingorum was named first (and has priority as a name over the former), the authors created the new combination Saurodektes kitchingorum for this material, then becoming the only valid species of that genus. In other words, S. rogersorum is a junior synonym of "O." (now S.) kitchingorum.
