= Lystrosaurus declivis Assemblage Zone =

Triassic biozone in South Africa

- Stratigraphic range: Early Triassic; ~251–249 Ma
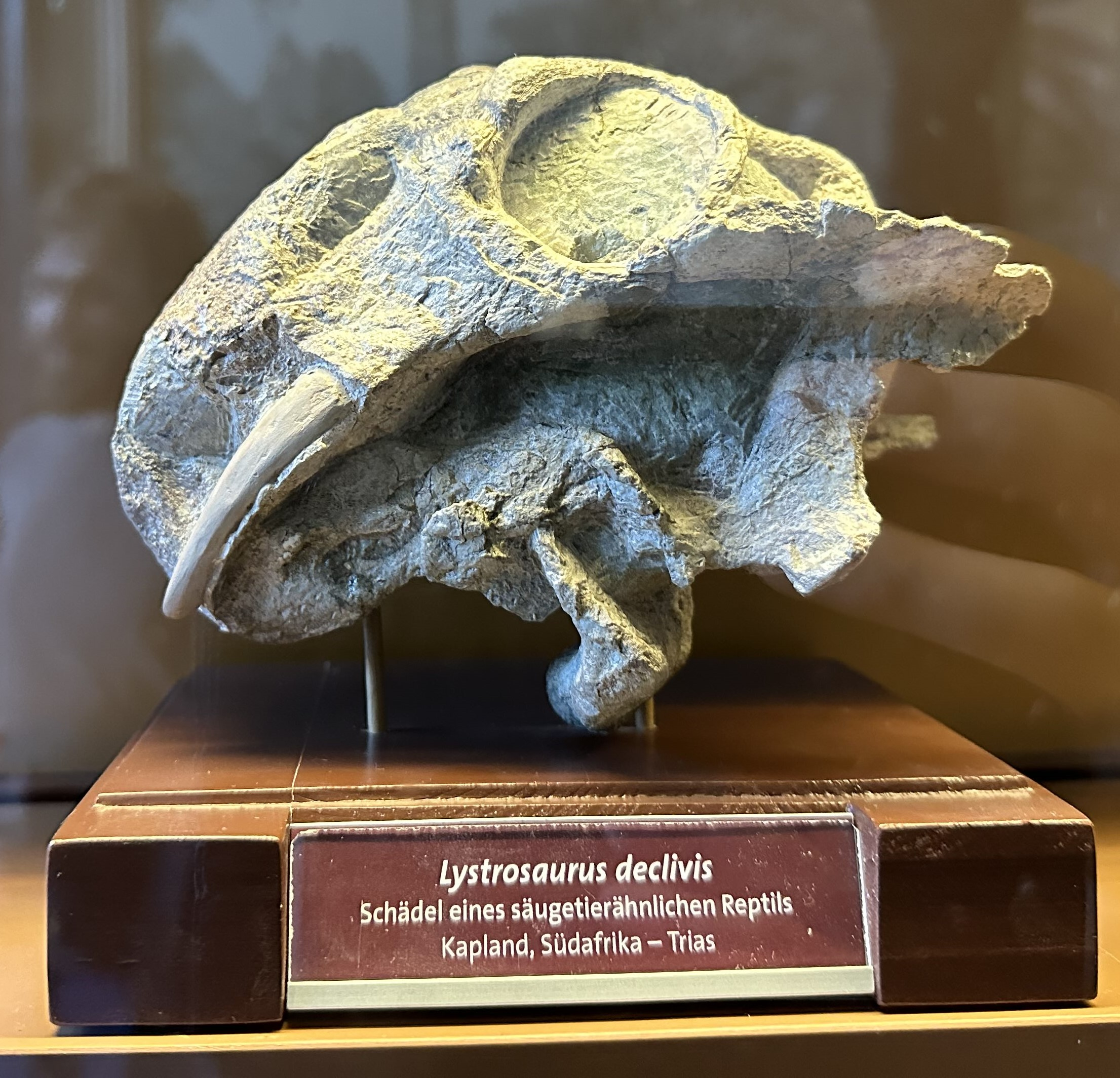
- Lystrosaurus declivis skull
- Type: Biozone
- Unit of: Beaufort Group within Adelaide Subgroup
- Sub-units: Upper Balfour Formation west of 24°E; Entire Katberg Formation east of 24°E
- Underlies: Cynognathus Assemblage Zone
- Overlies: Daptocephalus Assemblage Zone
- Thickness: up to 2,723.1 feet (830 m)

Location
- Location: Karoo Basin
- Coordinates: 32.0°S 25.5°E
- Approximate paleocoordinates: 65.8°S 22.1°W
- Region: Eastern Cape, Free State
- Country: South Africa
- Extent: Karoo Basin

Type section
- Named for: Lystrosaurus declivis
- Named by: Robert Broom
- Year defined: 1906, 1909

The Lystrosaurus declivis Assemblage Zone is a tetrapod assemblage zone or biozone which correlates to the upper Adelaide and lower Tarkastad Subgroups of the Beaufort Group, a fossiliferous and geologically important geological Group of the Karoo Supergroup in South Africa. This biozone has outcrops in the south central Eastern Cape (Middelburg, Queenstown, Aliwal North, Nieu-Bethesda) and in the southern and northeastern Free State (Bethulie, Gariep Dam, Mthatha, Harrismith). The Lystrosaurus declivis Assemblage Zone is one of eight biozones found in the Beaufort Group, and is considered to be Early Triassic in age.

The name of the biozone refers to Lystrosaurus declivis, a small to medium-sized species of Lystrosaurus, a dicynodont therapsid. It is characterized by the appearance of further Lystrosaurus species which are confined to this biozone. Lystrosaurus maccaigi and Lystrosaurus curvatus are the only two species found outside the Lystrosaurus Assemblage Zone in Upper Permian deposits of the underlying Daptocephalus Assemblage Zone.

== History ==
The first fossils to be found in the Beaufort Group rocks that encompass the current eight biozones were discovered by Andrew Geddes Bain in 1856. However, it was not until 1892 that it was observed that the geological strata of the Beaufort Group could be differentiated based on their fossil taxa. The initial undertaking was done by Harry Govier Seeley who subdivided the Beaufort Group into three biozones, which he named (from oldest to youngest):

- Zone of "Pareiasaurians"
- Zone of "Dicynodonts"
- Zone of "highly specialized group of theriodonts"

These proposed biozones Seeley named were subdivided further by Robert Broom between 1906 and 1909. Broom proposed the following biozones (from oldest to youngest):

- Pareiasaurus beds
- Endothiodon beds
- Kistecephalus beds
- Lystrosaurus beds
- Procolophon beds
- Cynognathus beds

These biozone divisions were approved by paleontologists of the time and were left largely unchanged for several decades. The Lystrosaurus Assemblage Zone was first named by Robert Broom in 1906. Initially Broom had subdivided the existing Lystrosaurus zone into the Lystrosaurus and Procolophon Assemblage Zones respectively. The biozone was later revised in 1976 by James Kitching where Kitching assimilated the Procolophon zone into the Lystrosaurus zone due to discovering that fossils of the small parareptile Procolophon were likewise found throughout the Lystrosaurus zone.

In 2020, Botha & Smith renamed the "Lystrosaurus Assemblage Zone" to the Lystrosaurus declivis Assemblage Zone, specifying the most common tetrapod species found in—and limited to—the zone.

== Lithology ==
The Lystrosaurus declivis Assemblage Zone ranges from the Palingkloof Member of the upper Balfour Formation west of 24°E. It comprises the entire Katberg Formation and the first third of the Burgersdorp Formation east of 24°E. The Balfour Formation is located within the Adelaide Subgroup, while the Katberg and Burgersdorp are within the Tarkastad Subgroup of the Beaufort Group. Its contact with the underlying Daptocephalus Assemblage Zone marks the Permian-Triassic boundary.

The boundary is defined by a change in the sedimentary rock types. The changing rock types across the boundary reveal a change in the fluvial environment, from meandering high sinuosity river channels composed of greenish-grey siltstones and mudstones found in the underlying Daptocephalus Assemblage Zone. From the start of the Palingkloof Member the predominant presence of mudstone and siltstone show that meandering river channels were present, however, in arid and warmer conditions due to change in colour of the rocks to reddish-brown and maroon. These are inter-spaced with claystones, olive to grey fine-grained sandstone, and reddish-brown to maroon shales. In the overlying Katberg Formation, alluvial fans containing braided low sinuosity river channels comprising mainly coarse-grained sandstone appear. These sandstones form either single and multi-storey channel sandstones and crevasse-splay sandstones. The dominance of sandstones is diagnostic of the Katberg Formation. The sandstones are interspersed by reddish-brown siltstones and mudstones which were deposited as silt sediments washed down the braided channels further down the Karoo Basin. The mudstones here often contain cracks which are infilled with sandstone. The domination of sandstone in the Lystrosaurus declivis Assemblage Zone shows that the climate at the time had become more arid, where rainfall was unpredictable and the shallow, braided rivers would seasonally dry up. When the rivers flowed again after the rains, due to being shallow, they would frequently flood their banks, hence the presence of crevasse-splays. Conglomerates are also found in eastern outcrops, which are indicative of erosion occurring due to die-offs of plant ecosystems. There is in addition a notable gap in coal deposits at this time as a result. Siltstone and mudstone outcrops are less common, with the majority of outcrops of these being found in the lower sections within the Palingkloof Member and in its uppermost section within the Burgersdorp Formation. Nodule conglomerates comprising pedogenic nodules and intrabasinal clasts are also found.

== Paleontology ==
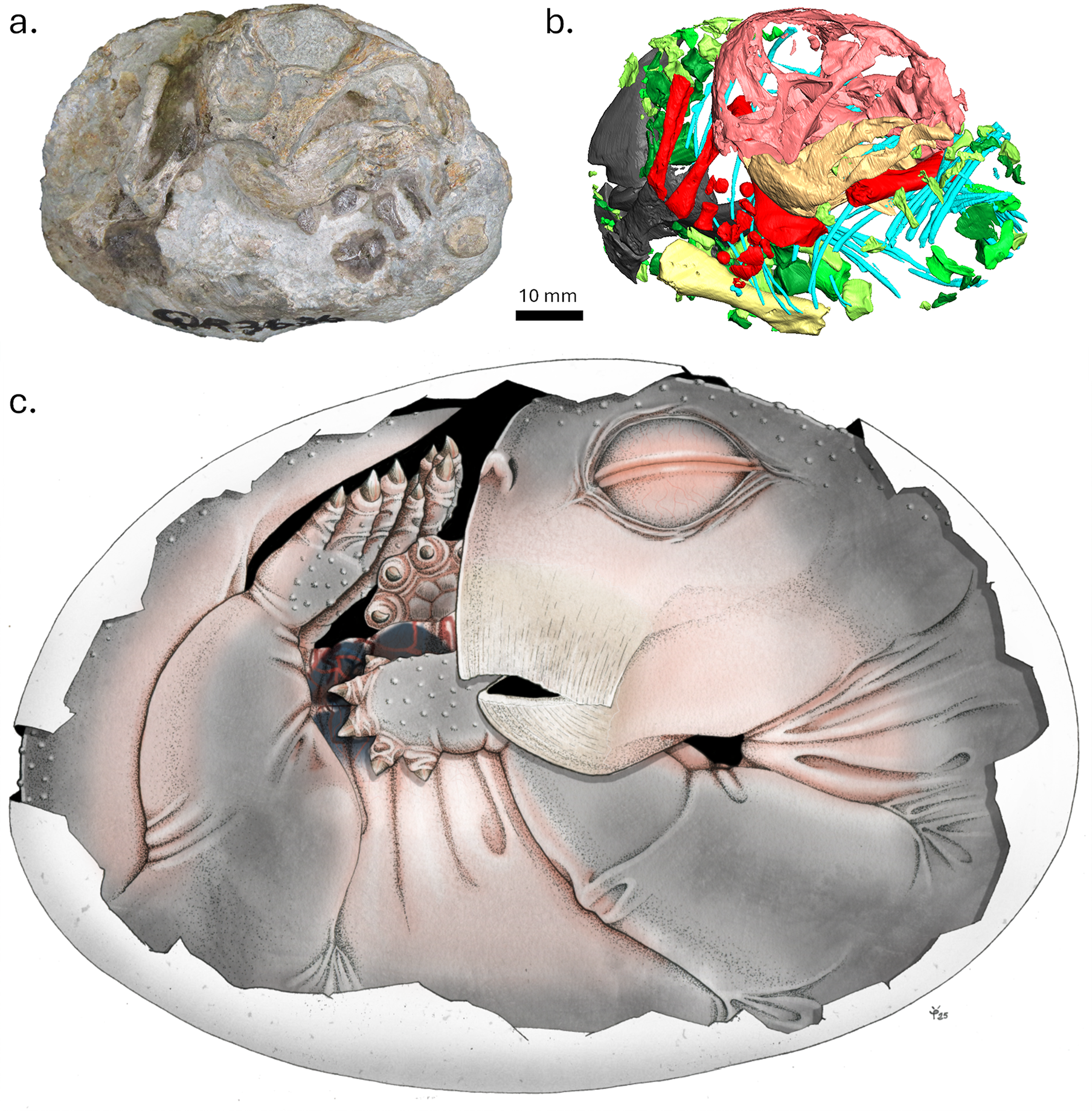
Preserved embryo of Lystrosaurus from the Early Triassic of South Africa, with life restoration showing embryo curled up in inferred (but unpreserved) egg

There is a marked drop in species abundance in the Lystrosaurus declivis Assemblage Zone due to ecological crises which followed the Permian-Triassic extinction event. However, this has not affected the abundance of vertebrate fossils found within this biozone. The most ubiquitous fossils found are different species of Lystrosaurus, the most commonly occurring being Lystrosaurus murrayi and Lystrosaurus declivis. Lystrosaurus maccaigi is the only species of Lystrosaurus not found in the biozone of its namesake. Lystrosaurus curvatus does appear in the lowermost section of the biozone, although it disappears at the contact between the Palingkloof Member of the Balfour Formation and the Katberg Formation. For this reason L. curvatus is used as an index fossil for outcrops of the Permian-Triassic boundary. In the lower Katberg Formation, complete and sometimes mummified articulated skeletons of L. murrayi and L. declivus are found in bonebeds containing several individuals. The bonebeds are almost always overlain by mudrock infilled with sandstone and capped by other coarse-grained sediments. This provides substantial geological and taphonomical evidence that these Lystrosaurus died near to dried up river channels, mummified in the arid climate before their remains were buried by floods.

The Permian-Triassic extinction event caused the extinction of all gorgonopsians and almost all dicynodont species except for Lystrosaurus and a select few other species such as Myosaurus gracilis. Therocephalian species experienced a Lilliput Effect where only smaller species survived and thrived after the extinction event. Moschorhinus, for example, was one of the larger therocephalians to survive the initial extinction event, however, fossil occurrences of this species cease above the lower Katberg Formation. This is also true of Lystrosaurus where only the smaller species thrived in the Triassic. By the upper sections of the biozone, ecological niches began to recover as evidenced by the appearance of new species. Cynodonts experienced the greatest diversification with species such as Thrinaxodon liorhinus and Galesaurus planiceps being found. In the upper Katberg and the lower Burgersdorp Formations more derived cynodonts, the Eucynodontia, make an appearance. Small procolophonoid 'parareptiles' such as Saurodektes kitchingorum and Procolophon trigoniceps, and temnospondyl amphibians are also found. In addition, the earliest ancestors of Archosauria appear in the Lystrosaurus zone. These species are known as archosauromorphs and archosauriformes. Examples of these are Prolacerta broomi and Proterosuchus fergusi respectively found in the lower Lystrosaurus declivis Assemblage Zone. A variety of ichnofossils are also found, especially burrow casts left by Lystrosaurus. The deep-bodied ray-finned fish Caruichthys was also found in layers of this biozone.

== Age and correlations ==
The Lystrosaurus declivis Assemblage Zone dates to approximately 251 to 249 Ma, and correlates with the Kopanskaya and Staritskaya Formations of Russia, and with the Jiucaiyuan Formation of China, the Knocklofty and Arcadia Formations of Australia, the Buena Vista Formation of the Paraná Basin, South America, and the Panchet Formation of India.

== See also ==
- List of synapsids
- Triassic land vertebrate faunachrons
