= Tomeia =

Tomeia Temporal range: Olenekian

Scientific classification
- Kingdom: Animalia
- Phylum: Chordata
- Clade: Tetrapoda
- Order: †Temnospondyli
- Suborder: †Stereospondyli
- Clade: †Capitosauria
- Genus: †Tomeia
- Species: †T. witecki

Binomial name
- †Tomeia witecki Eltink et al., 2017

Extinct genus of temnospondyl

Tomeia is an extinct genus of capitosaur that lived during the Olenekian stage of the Early Triassic epoch in Brazil.

== History of study ==
The holotype and only known specimen of the type species, Tomeia witecki, was first figured and briefly described, but not named, by Dias-da-Silva et al. (2009). The formal naming of the taxon was done by Eltink et al. (2017). The specimen comes from the fossiliferous Bica São Tomé locality (Sanga do Cabral Formation) in Rio Grande do Sul.

In a review of the type locality, Pinheiro & Stock Da-Rosa (2024) mentioned that a fragment found a decade after the discovery of the holotype fits with the holotype and that further study of the taxon in light of this additional data is in progress.

== Description ==
Tomeia differs from other capitosaurs by a unique combination of characters that include: short parasphenoid-pterygoid suture, separation of the pterygoid and the exoccipital by the parasphenoid, well-developed ornamentation on the ventral surface of the parasphenoid, a more dorsally located oblique ridge relative to other capitosaurs, its slit-like posttemporal fenestra, and the exceptionally large size of its paraquadrate foramen when compared with the accessory paraquadrate foramen. A single autapomorphy - a ventrolaterally extensive descending postparietal lamina that excludes the exoccipital from the posttemporal fenestra - was also identified.

== Phylogenetic relationships ==
Due to its incompleteness, Tomeia has rarely been sampled in phylogenetic analyses of any taxonomic scale beyond the original analysis performed by Eltink et al. (2017). Those workers recovered Tomeia nested well within Capitosauroidea as the sister taxon to Edingerella, although their topology differs from most other capitosaur analyses in that Edingerella is usually at or near the base of Capitosauria and outside of Capitosauroidea.
