= Daptocephalus Assemblage Zone =

Biozone of fossils

- Stratigraphic range: Late Permian (Wuchiapingian to Changhsingian); ~255.2–252.24 Ma
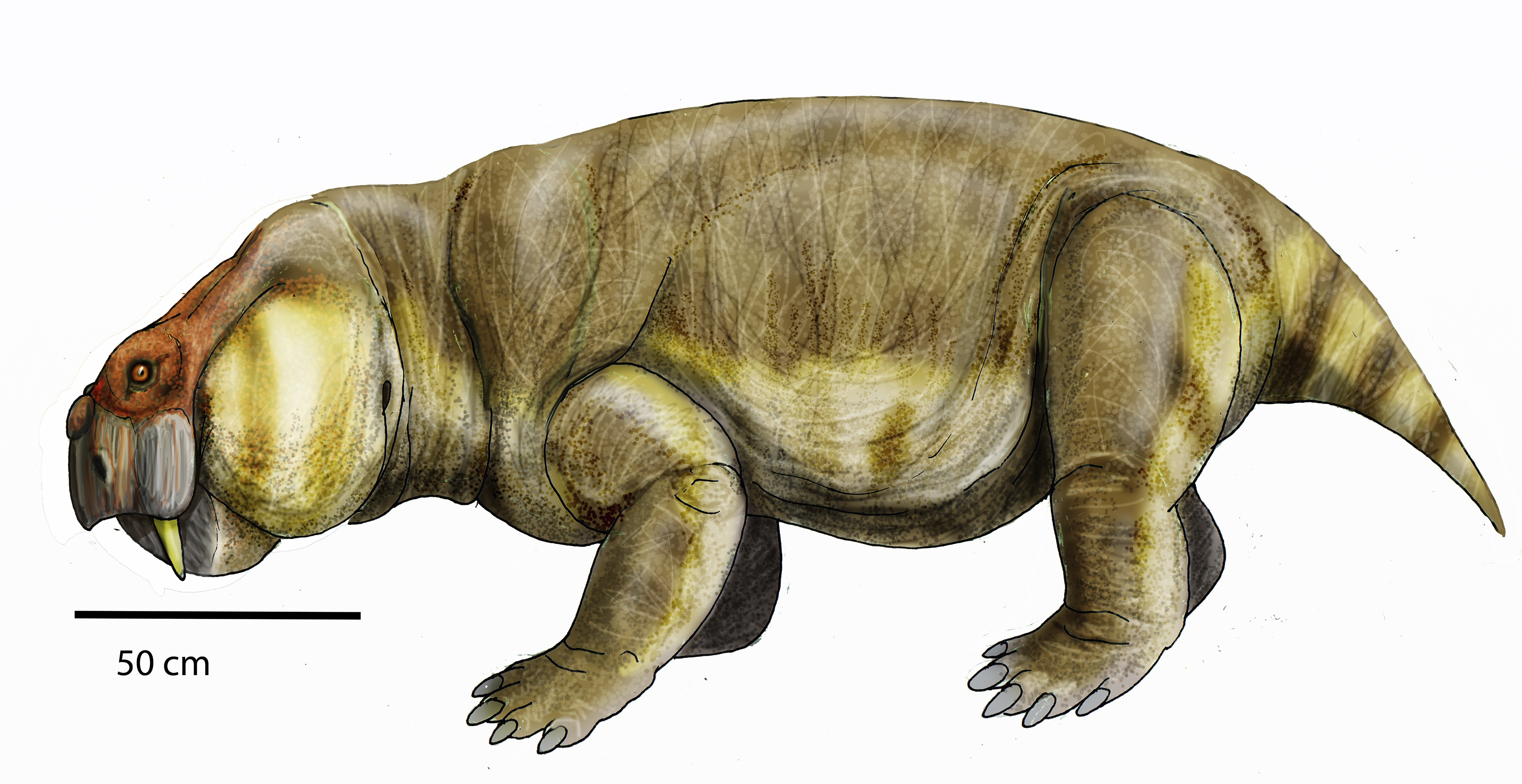
- Daptocephalus leoniceps
- Type: Biozone
- Unit of: Beaufort Group within Adelaide Supgroup
- Sub-units: Upper Teekloof Formation west of 24°E; Balfour Formation east of 24°E
- Underlies: Lystrosaurus declivis Assemblage Zone
- Overlies: Cistecephalus Assemblage Zone
- Thickness: up to 1,640.42 ft (500.00 m)

Location
- Location: Karoo Basin
- Region: Northern & Eastern Cape, Free State
- Country: South Africa

Type section
- Named for: Daptocephalus
- Named by: James Kitching, Bruce Rubidge, Pia Viglietti

The Daptocephalus Assemblage Zone is a tetrapod assemblage zone or biozone found in the Adelaide Subgroup of the Beaufort Group, a majorly fossiliferous and geologically important Group of the Karoo Supergroup in South Africa. This biozone has outcrops located in the upper Teekloof Formation west of 24°E, the majority of the Balfour Formation east of 24°E, and the Normandien Formation in the north. It has numerous localities which are spread out from Colesberg in the Northern Cape, Graaff-Reniet to Mthatha in the Eastern Cape, and from Bloemfontein to Harrismith in the Free State. The Daptocephalus Assemblage Zone is one of eight biozones found in the Beaufort Group and is considered Late Permian (Lopingian) in age. Its contact with the overlying Lystrosaurus declivis Assemblage Zone marks the Permian-Triassic boundary.

Previously known as the Dicynodon Assemblage Zone, the name of the biozone refers to Daptocephalus, a medium-sized dicynodont therapsid. It is characterized by the presence of this species in co-occurrence with Theriognathus microps, and Dicynodon lacerticeps.

== History ==
The first fossils to be found in the Beaufort Group rocks that encompass the current eight biozones were discovered by Andrew Geddes Bain in 1856. However, it was not until 1892 that it was observed that the geological strata of the Beaufort Group could be differentiated based on their fossil taxa. The initial undertaking was done by Harry Govier Seeley who subdivided the Beaufort Group into three biozones, which he named (from oldest to youngest):

- Zone of "Pareiasaurians"
- Zone of "Dicynodonts"
- Zone of "highly specialized group of theriodonts"

These proposed biozones Seeley named were subdivided further by Robert Broom between 1906 and 1909. Broom proposed the following biozones (from oldest to youngest):

- Pareiasaurus beds
- Endothiodon beds
- Kistecephalus beds
- Lystrosaurus beds
- Procolophon beds
- Cynognathus beds

These biozone divisions were approved by paleontologists of the time and were left largely unchanged for several decades. The Daptocephalus Assemblage Zone was first named after the dicynodont Daptocephlaus leoniceps by James Kitching due to the high prevalence, and localized appearance, of this species. However, the name of the biozone was changed to the Dicynodon Assemblage Zone as it was argued that Daptocephalus was in fact a juvenile of Dicynodon. In addition it was thought that Dicynodon was a more suitable taxon for global biostratigraphic correlation of other Karoo-aged basins, namely to those in Zambia, Tanzania, China, and Russia. In recent years, with new paleontological finds and updated logging of geological formations and biostratigraphy of the Karoo Basin, it was found that there has been some taxonomic confusion with Dicynodon fossils. In addition, recent taxonomic studies have shown that Daptocephalus is indeed its own species, and is only found within the confines of the biozone. Subsequently it was renamed the Daptocephalus Assemblage Zone.

== Lithology ==
The Daptocephalus Assemblage Zone is located only in the upper Balfour formation and lower Normandien formation east of 24°E. These formations all fall within the Adelaide Subgroup of the Beaufort Group, sediments of which were formed in a large retroarc foreland basin in south-western Gondwana. The biozone is subdivided into the lower Daptocephalus-Theriognathus subzone and the upper Lystrosaurus-Moschorhinus subzone. This satisfies the appearance of Lystrosaurus maccaigi below the Lystrosaurus declivis Assemblage Zone boundary, and the disappearance of the lower subzone taxa Theriognathus, Dicynodon, and Procynosuchus delaharpeae.

At the time of sedimentary deposition, the Karoo retroarc foreland system was in an overfilled phase, and purely terrestrial sediments occupied the Karoo Basin at this time. Two fining-upward sequences are observed in the sedimentary stratigraphy of Daptocephalus biozone, bounded by a second-order subaerial unconformity. These sedimentary rocks comprise greenish-grey mudrock with siltstone lenses in the lower to middle sections of the biozone, which are indicative of a low-energy fluvial environments with meandering rivers. It is in these rocks that fossils are most commonly found. As the biozone reaches its termination, its contact with the overlying Katberg Formation marks a sharp change in the lithology. The sedimentary rocks change to being sandstone-rich with these sandstone bodies commonly appearing within outcrops of brownish-red shale and reddish mudstone. The appearance and proliferation of these sandstone deposits marks the change to braided river systems where sands were only deposited with the finer sediments being washed further downstream.

Fossil abundance and preservation quality does not change across the boundary, however, species abundance does due to the extinction event, and also the preservational style of the fossils. More isolated skulls are found in the Permian, whereas in the earliest Triassic, curled up complete skeletons are more common as are bonebeds. These lithological and taphonomic changes are used as evidence for the sudden drying of the climate associated with the Permian-Triassic extinction event.

== Paleontology ==
The lower to middle zones of the Daptocephlaus Assemblage Zone display a great diversity of vertebrate fauna. These include its current type species Daptocephalus and other dicynodonts such as the ubiquitous Diictodon, Dinanomodon, and Pristerodon. Various species of burnetiamorph Biarmosuchians and Rubidgenae Gorgonopsians are also found. Therocephalian species such as Moschorhinus kitchingi and the earliest cynodont Charassognathus gracilis also appear. Parareptile species, namely captorhinids, the Younginiforme Youngina, and a variety of temnospondyl amphibians, fishes, and plant fossils such as Glossopteris are likewise found. The upper zones as the Permian-Triassic boundary approaches, there is a marked drop in species diversity as the Permian-Triassic extinction event began to take its course.

== Age and correlations ==
The Daptocephalus Assemblage Zone dates to approximately 254.5 to 251 Ma, and correlates with the Kutuluksaya and Kulchomovskaya Formations of Russia, and with the lower Buena Vista Formation of the Paraná Basin, South America. Radiocarbon analysis by Rubidge et al. (2013) revised the dating of the lower Daptocephalus AZ to 255.2 Ma. A more recent study by Gastaldo and colleagues found the upper boundary of the assemblage zone dated to 252.24 ± 0.11. The revised dating of the upper subzone suggests the terrestrial extinction in Karoo Basin occurred 300,000 years before the marine extinction.

== See also ==
- List of synapsids
