= Owenetta =

Owenetta Temporal range: 260.5–250 Ma Mid Wuchiapingian - early Induan

Scientific classification
- Kingdom: Animalia
- Phylum: Chordata
- Class: Reptilia
- Family: †Owenettidae
- Genus: †Owenetta; Broom, 1939

Type species
- †Owenetta rubidgei Broom, 1939

Synonyms
- ?Colubrifer Carroll, 1982; ?Colubrifer campi Carroll, 1982

Extinct genus of reptiles

Owenetta is an extinct genus of owenettid procolophonian. Fossils have been found from the Beaufort Group in the Karoo Basin of South Africa. Although most procolophonians lived during the Triassic, Owenetta existed during the Wuchiapingian and Changhsingian stages of the Late Permian. It is the type genus of the family Owenettidae, and can be distinguished from other related taxa in that the posterior portion of the supratemporal bears a lateral notch and that the pineal foramen is surrounded by a depressed parietal surface on the skull table.

== Species ==
The type species of Owenetta is O. rubidgei. It is known from several skulls, but no postcranial skeleton. It was described in 1939 from a partial skull found from the Late Permian Cistecephalus Assemblage Zone of the Beaufort Group. Several other localities, all from the overlying Dicynodon Assemblage Zone, have yielded the remainder of the known specimens.

In 2003, Colubrifer, named in 1982 from a specimen (UCMP 42773) found from the Early Triassic Lystrosaurus Assemblage Zone and thought to represent a short limbed lizard, was re-described. Based on a skull nearly identical to those known of Owenetta, it appears that the animal was a procolophonian almost certainly of that genus. It was found to be a junior synonym of Owenetta, but due to the poor preservation of its holotype, was reassigned Owenetta sp.

=== "O." kitchingorum ===
The naming of a new species in 2002, O. kitchingorum, was suggested to extend the temporal range of Owenetta into the Early Triassic, meaning that the genus would have survived past the Permian–Triassic extinction event. This new species was considered distinct from the type species based on features found from three nearly complete specimens that were present from the Lystrosaurus Assemblage Zone. Found in 1968, the first material of O. kitchingorum was a small block containing two skeletons in close proximity to one another (although at the time they were thought to be of the type species). These skeletons provided much of the information used to distinguish O. kitchingorum from the type species. O. kitchingorum differed from O. rubidgei in that it possessed small postparietals on the posterior edge of the skull table and that the maxilla held no more than 20 teeth, some of which were caniniform. The best preserved specimen seems to be a subadult individual on the basis of features of the skull table.

A year after O. kitchingorum was named, Modesto and colleagues described Saurodektes rogersorum, a new South African owenettid from the Early Triassic, based on a fragmentary skull and postcranium. The authors further proposed that "O." kitchingorum should be assigned to its own distinct genus. A 2007 paper also supported this polyphyly.

In 2020, Hamley and colleagues reassessed the validity of "Owenetta" kitchingorum in relation to the coeval Saurodektes. These authors noted that, while Modesto et al. (2003) had interpreted the two as distinct, three traits diagnostic to "O." kitchingorum can not be observed in the fragmentary S. rogersorum skull. Furthermore, one of the characters previously regarded as unique to "O." kitchingorum is also present in Barasaurus. Various traits proposed as diagnostic for S. rogersorum are also present in fossils of "O." kitchingorum. The authors concluded that "O." kitchingorum and S. rogersorum are effectively indistinguishable. Since "O." kitchingorum is significantly distinct from O. rubidgei, the type species of Owenetta, and thus not referable to this genus, the authors transferred it to the genus Saurodektes. However, since it is identical to S. rogersorum and "O." kitchingorum was named first (and has priority as a name over the former), the authors created the new combination Saurodektes kitchingorum for this material, then becoming the only valid species of that genus.

== Phylogenetics ==
When Owenetta was first named and described, it and other procolophonians were thought to be within Cotylosauria, a group that comprised what was believed to be the most primitive of reptiles. Cotylosauria has since been renamed Captorhinida, which is now thought to be a paraphyletic group anapsids and anapsid relatives. Owenetta and other procolophonians are now known to be within the subclass Parareptilia. It has later been placed within the family Nyctiphruretidae, but is currently placed within the family Owenettidae, of which it is the type genus.

The well-preserved, nearly complete specimens of Owenetta can be helpful in phylogenetic analyses of procolophonians and the parareptiles, which have recently undergone many great revisions. Although the postcranial skeleton is only known from immature individuals, comparisons can be made with related taxa such as Barasaurus, which is known from both immature and mature specimens, that resolve this morphology issue.
