= Sanga do Cabral Formation =

Geologic formation in Brazil

- Stratigraphic range: Early Triassic
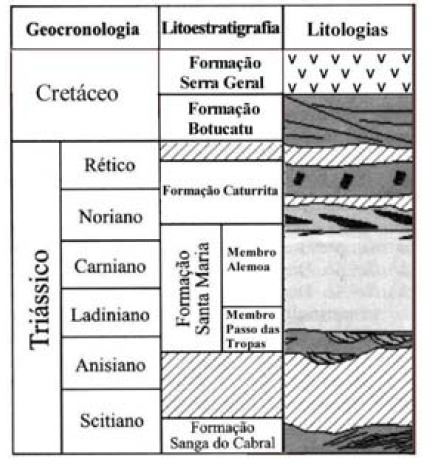
- Sanga do Cabral Formation. Source: UFSM
- Type: Geological formation
- Unit of: Rosário do Sul Group
- Underlies: Santa Maria Formation
- Overlies: Pirambóia Formation

Lithology
- Primary: Sandstone, conglomerate

Location
- Coordinates: 29.6°S 55.1°W
- Approximate paleocoordinates: 49.0°S 24.6°W
- Region: Paleorrota; Rio Grande do Sul
- Country: Brazil
- Extent: Paraná Basin
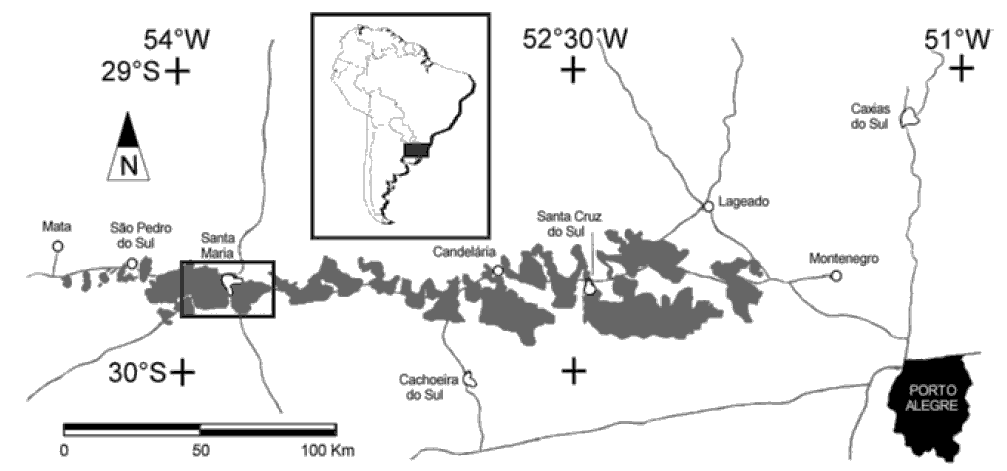
- Geopark of Paleorrota

The Sanga do Cabral Formation is an Early Triassic sedimentary rock formation found in Rio Grande do Sul, Brazil.

== Description ==
This rock formation is located in the geopark of Paleorrota, and is located to the south of another geopark. The formation dates to 249 million years ago and belongs to the Lower Triassic.

The Sanga do Cabral Formation is correlated with the "impoverished zone" (Procolophon subzone) of the Lystrosaurus Assemblage Zone of the Karoo Basin of South Africa by some authors on the basis of the abundant records of Procolophon.

== Fossil content ==
Among others, the following fossils have been reported from the formation:

- Elessaurus gondwanoccidens
- Kwatisuchus rosai
- Oryporan insolitus
- Procolophon trigoniceps
- Sangaia lavinai
- Teyujagua paradoxa
- Tomeia witecki
- Cynodontia indet.
- Lystosauridae Indet.
- Plagiosterninae indet.
- Chasmatosuchinae Indet.
- Temnospondyli indet.
- Procolophonidae Indet.

== Formations ==
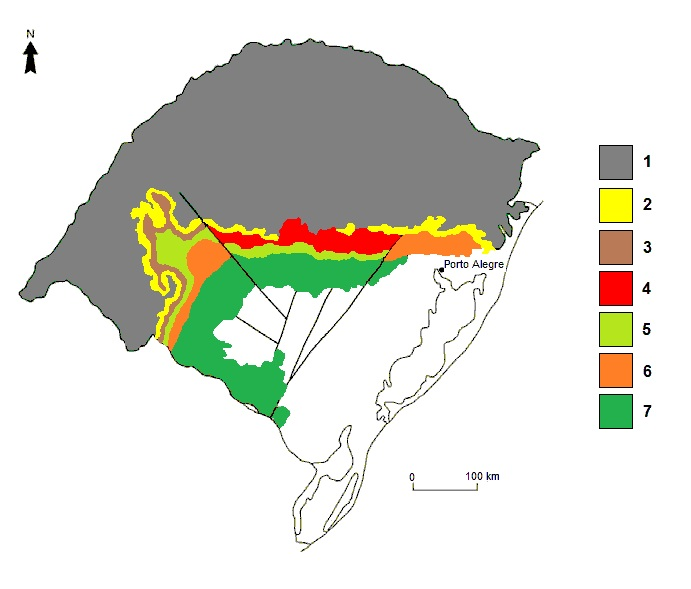
Geological formations in Rio Grande do Sul:
- 1) Serra Geral Formation, Cretaceous
- 2) Botucatu Formation, Cretaceous
- 3) Guará Formation, Jurassic
- 4) Santa Maria Formation & Caturrita Formation, Triassic
- 5) Sanga do Cabral Formation, Triassic
- 6) Piramboia Formation, Permian
- 7) Itararé Group, Permian

== See also ==
- Santa Maria Formation
- Caturrita Formation
- List of dinosaur-bearing rock formations
