= Paragalerhinus =

Scientific classification
- Domain: Eukaryota
- Kingdom: Animalia
- Phylum: Chordata
- Clade: Synapsida
- Clade: Therapsida
- Clade: †Gorgonopsia
- Family: †Gorgonopsidae
- Genus: †Paragalerhinus

Type species
- Paragalerhinus rubidgei Sigogneau, 1970

Extinct genus of therapsids

Paragalerhinus is an extinct genus of Gorgonopsia. It was first named by Sigogneau in 1970, and contains one species, P. rubidgei.

== See also ==
- List of therapsids

== Sources ==
- paleodb.org
- www.paleofile.com - Alphabetical list, Section P.
