= Lilliput effect =

Evolutionary decrease in body size of an animal species

The Lilliput effect is an observed decrease in animal body size in genera that have survived a major extinction. There are several hypotheses as to why these patterns appear in the fossil record, some of which are:

- simple preferential survival of smaller animals,
- dwarfing of larger lineages, and
- evolutionary miniaturization from larger ancestral stocks.

The term was coined in by Urbanek (1993) in a paper concerning the end-Silurian extinction of graptoloids and is derived from an island in Gulliver’s Travels, Lilliput, inhabited by a race of miniature people. The size decrease may just be a temporary phenomenon restricted to the survival period of the extinction event. Atkinson et al. (2019) coined the term Brobdingnag effect to describe a related phenomenon, operating in the opposite direction, whereby new species evolving after the Triassic-Jurassic mass extinction that began the period with small body sizes underwent substantial size increases. The term is also from Gulliver's Travels, where Brobdingnag is a place inhabited by a race of giants.

== Significance ==
Trends in body size changes are seen throughout the fossil record in many organisms, and major changes (shrinking and dwarfing) in body size can significantly affect the morphology of the animal itself as well as how it interacts with the environment. Since Urbanek's publication several researchers have described a decrease in body size in fauna post-extinction event, although not all use the term "Lilliput effect" when discussing this trend in body size decrease.

The Lilliput effect has been noted by several authors to have occurred after the Permian-Triassic mass extinction: Early Triassic fauna, both marine and terrestrial, is notably smaller than those preceding and following in the geologic record.

== Potential causes ==
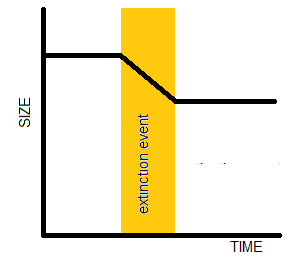
Graph demonstrating a decrease in body size post extinction event, adapted from Twitchett (2007).

=== Extinction of larger taxa ===
The extinction event may have been more severe for the larger-bodied species, leaving only species of smaller-bodied animals behind. As such, organisms in the smaller species which then make up the recovering ecosystem, will take time to evolve larger bodies to replace the extinct species and re-occupy the vacant ecological niche for a large-bodied animal. Taxa whose animals are larger may be evolutionarily selected against for several reasons, including

- high energy requirements for which the resources may no longer be available,
- increased generation times compared to smaller bodied organisms, and
- smaller populations, which would be more severely affected by environmental changes.

=== Development of new organisms ===
Stanley (1973) hypothesized that newly emerged animal taxa tend to develop at an originally small size, hence a sudden proliferation of new species would tend to produce many initially small organisms.

=== Shrinking of surviving taxa ===
It is possible that the extinction event selectively removed larger individuals within any single lineage, without extinguishing the entire species, but leaving as survivors only the individuals with a naturally smaller body size. The smaller survivors then form the new breeding population, and pass on that trait to their descendents. Because of the selection during the extinction, compared to the previously "normal"-sized members of the species who lived before the extinction event occurred, later members of that species living after the extinction, who are descended only from the smaller survivors, would be reduced in size, constituting a "new-normal".
