= Lists of synapsids =

These lists of synapsids collectively include every genus that has ever been included in the clade Synapsida- the mammals and their evolutionary precursors. The lists includes accepted genera along with those now considered invalid, doubtful (nomina dubia), not formally published (nomina nuda), junior synonyms of more established names, as well as genera that are no longer considered synapsids.

== Lists ==
- List of pelycosaurs
- List of therapsids
- List of prehistoric mammals
- List of mammals

== See also ==
- List of reptiles
  - List of birds
