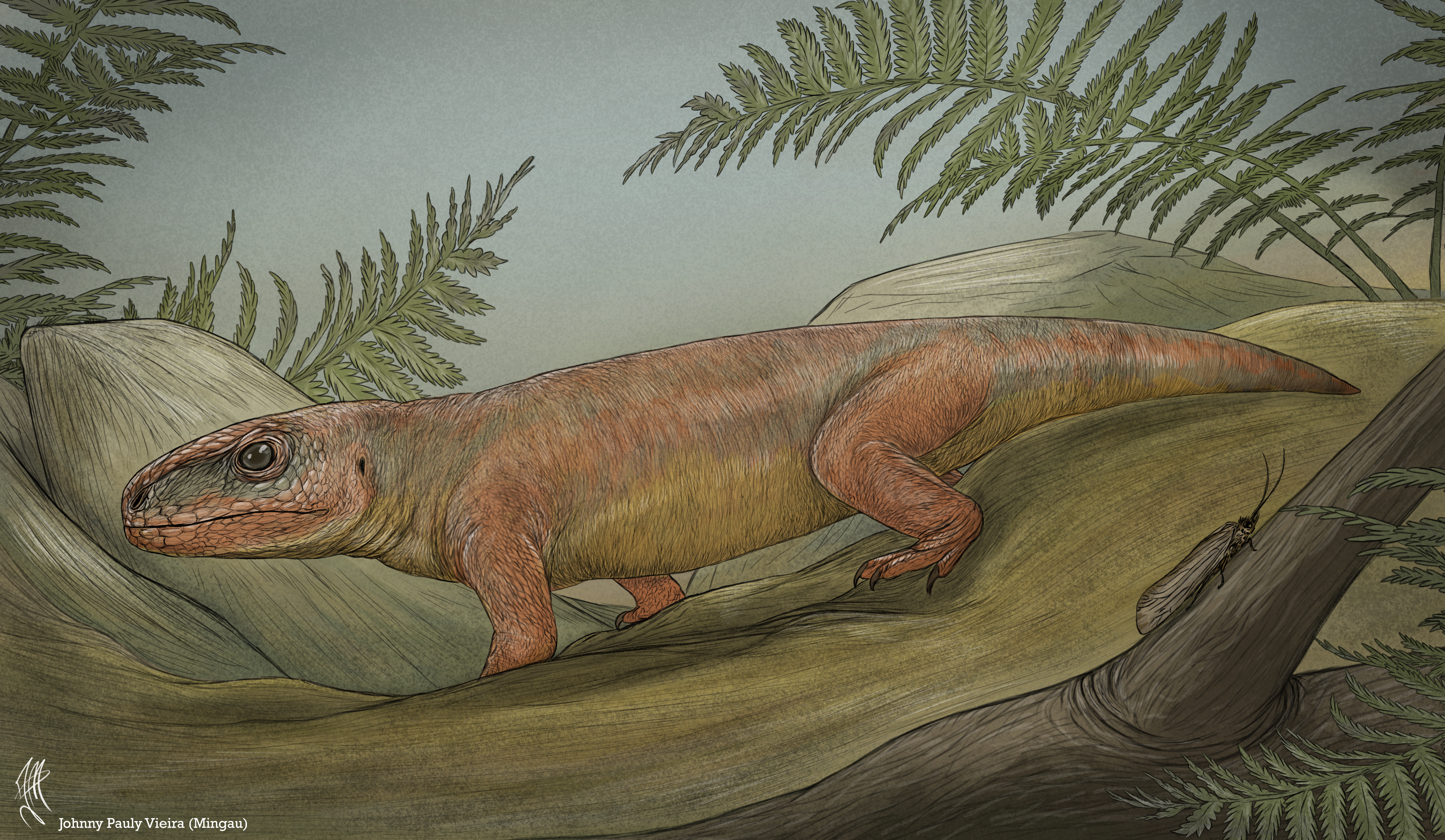

Scientific classification
- Domain: Eukaryota
- Kingdom: Animalia
- Phylum: Chordata
- Clade: †Parareptilia
- Order: †Procolophonomorpha
- Family: †Owenettidae
- Genus: †Candelaria; Price, 1947
- Species: †C. barbouri

Binomial name
- †Candelaria barbouri Price, 1947

= Candelaria barbouri =

Candelaria barbouri Temporal range: Ladinian ~242–235 Ma

Extinct genus of reptiles

Candelaria is an extinct genus of owenettid parareptile. It was the first procolophonomorph discovered in the Santa Maria Formation at the geopark of Paleorrota, in the town of Candelária, by Llewellyn Ivor Price in 1942 and described in 1947. The skull and mandible has been measured at 20 millimetres (0.79 in) in height. It was about 40 centimetres (16 in) long and lived during the Ladinian in the Middle Triassic, from about 242 to 235 million years ago.
