= Beaufort Group =

Geological group in South Africa

- Stratigraphic range: Guadalupian-Early Triassic; ~268–247 Ma
- Type: Geologic group
- Underlies: Stormberg Group
- Overlies: Ecca Group
- Thickness: up to 22,965.88 feet (7,000 m)

Lithology
- Primary: Mudstone, claystone, siltstone
- Other: Sandstone, shale, Tuff

Location
- Region: Northern Cape, Western, Eastern Cape, KwaZulu-Natal, Free State.
- Country: South Africa
- Extent: 145 000 km squared
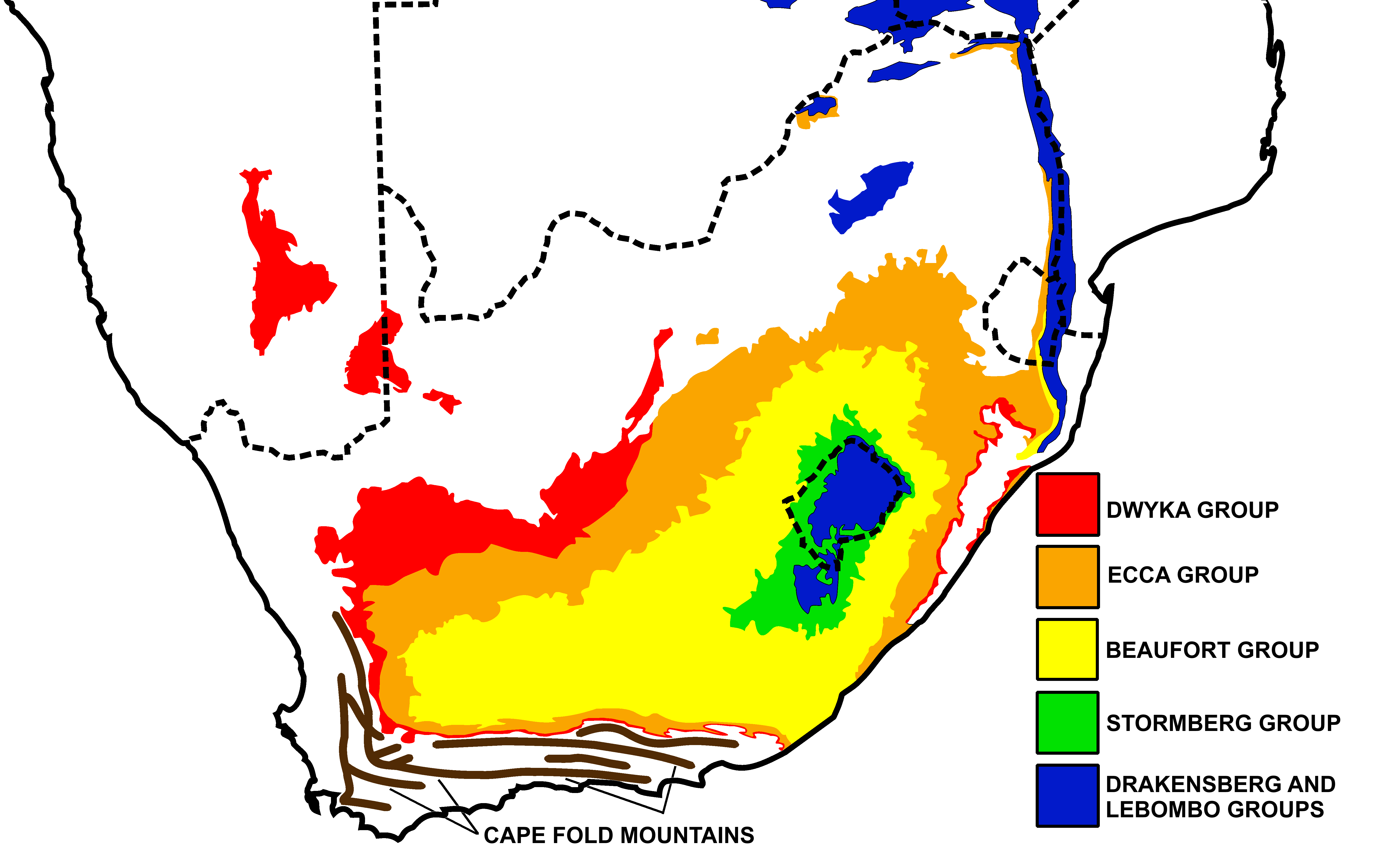
- A simplified geological map of the outcrops of Karoo Supergroup rocks in Southern Africa. The Beaufort Group is represented by the yellow key on the map.

The Beaufort Group is the third of the main subdivisions of the Karoo Supergroup in South Africa. It is composed of a lower Adelaide Subgroup and an upper Tarkastad Subgroup. It follows conformably after the Ecca Group and unconformably underlies the Stormberg Group. Based on stratigraphic position, lithostratigraphic and biostratigraphic correlations, palynological analyses, and other means of geological dating, the Beaufort Group rocks are considered to range between Middle Permian (Wordian) to Early Triassic (Anisian) in age.

== Background ==
During the period when sedimentation of the Beaufort Group rocks took place, the Ecca sea had retreated to the northeastern Karoo Basin. All sediment deposition at this time took place in a terrestrial, although in a predominantly fluvial or alluvial environment that was seasonally arid. This environment covered a vast area and deposition was influenced by a retroarc foreland basin. This foreland system was caused by crustal uplift (orogenesis) that had previously begun to take course due to the subduction of the Palaeo-pacific plate beneath the Gondwanan Plate. This resulted in the rise of the Gondwanide mountain range in what is known as the Gondwanide orogeny. The continuation of mountain-building and erosion from the growing Gondwanide mountain chain and associated subduction created accommodation space for sediment deposition in the Karoo Basin. Orogenic loading was the initial subsidence mechanism acting on the Karoo Basin and flexural tectonics partitioned the Karoo Basin into the foredeep, forebulge, and backbulge flexural provinces. Orogenic loading and unloading caused changes in position of the forebulge and foredeep. This resulted in the deposition zones shifting from the proximal or distal regions of the Karoo Basin.

The Beaufort Group rocks are predominantly mudstone-dominated up until the upper sections in the lower Tarkastad Subgroup. Tuffs are also found due to concurrent volcanic activity that took place with the foreland tectonics.

== Geographic extent ==
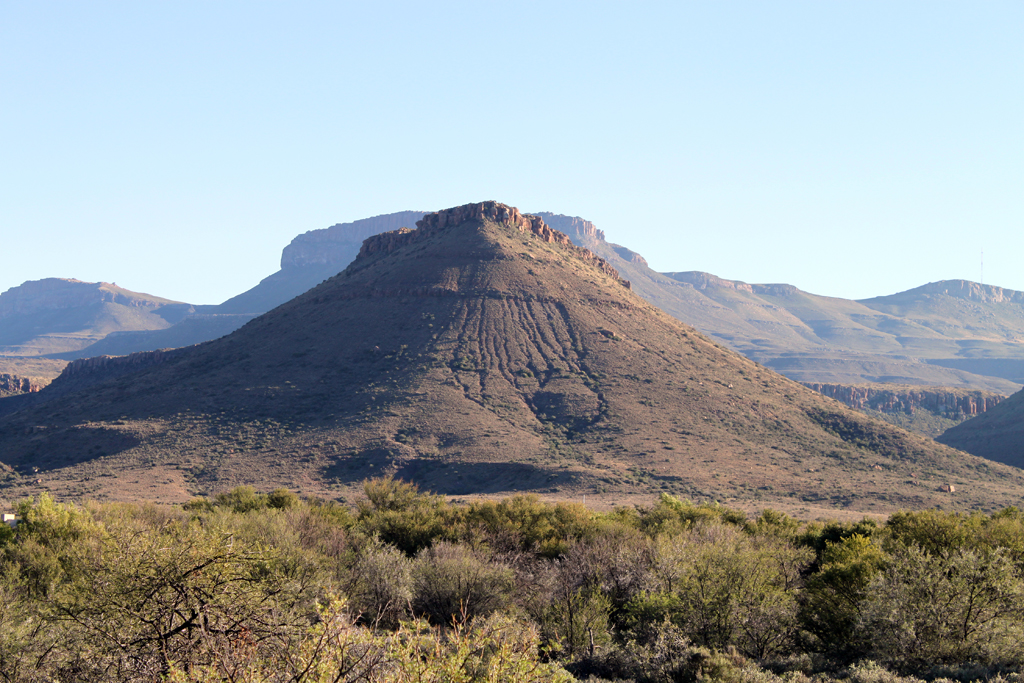
Hill in siliciclastic strata (mud or siltstones capped by solid sandstone) of Teekloof or Abrahamskraal formation (Beaufort Group) of the Main Karoo Basin. Karoo National Park near Beaufort West, Western Cape Province, South Africa.

The geological formations of the Beaufort Group are outcrop over approximately 145 000 km^{2}, attaining a total thickness of around 6000 m thick at its thickest outcrops. In the west, the lowermost Beaufort Group rocks are found east of Laingsburg and remain continuous eastward to East London. Deposits are also found in the central Karoo and continue north-north-eastwards to Gariep Dam, Colesberg, and up to Bloemfontein. In the extreme north and north-east, the Beaufort Group outcrops in Harrismith and northeastern KwaZulu-Natal.

== Stratigraphic units ==
Adelaide Subgroup

The Adelaide Subgroup is the lower subgroup of the Beaufort Group and contains all Middle to Late Permian-aged rocks. This subgroup contains six geological formations in total, however, these formations are latitude specific. These formations are the Abrahaamskraal and Teekloof Formations, west of 24°E, Middleton and Balfour Formations east of 24°E, and the Normandien and Emakwezini Formations in the northern Free-State and Kwa-Zulu Natal provinces. Composing the lower Beaufort succession, the rocks are mudstone-dominated. The mudstones in the lower Beaufort Group are mainly greenish-grey to blueish-grey and gradually change to greyish-red, reddish-brown or purple in color. The dominant presence of mudstones in the lower Beaufort Group represent tranquil depositional settings such as overbank or floodplain facies associations. The formations here are listed below (from oldest to youngest):

West of 24 degrees

- Abrahamskraal Formation: The Abrahamskraal Formation is found in both its western and eastern deposits. Previously, east of 24 degrees deposits of the Abrahaamskraal Formation were known as the Koonap Formation. Recently these were amalgamated into the Abrahaamskraal Formation due to recent stratigraphic and biostratigraphic research.
- Teekloof Formation: Floodplain facies association comprising some greenish-grey mudstones. However, redder mudstones are dominant.

East of 24 degrees

- Middleton Formation: Lies conformably over the Abrahamskraal Formation in the east. Semi-arid climate supported a lush flora and fauna that thrived along meander belts and semi-permanent lakes. The formation contains lenses of red mudstone which are likely to have been deposited in a sub-aerial fluvial environment.
- Balfour Formation: Low-energy, fluvial environmental facies, most likely one that had meandering rivers. Mudstone-rich.
- Normadien Formation (northeastern region only): Mudstone-rich, but these are interbedded with diagnostic layers of very coarse-grained sandstones that exhibit coarsening upward cycles.
- Emakwezini Formation (northeastern KwaZulu-Natal only): An extremely understudied geological formation that outcrops in a thin, faulted, and meridional belt in central Eswatini and the southern Lebombo Basin of northeastern KwaZulu-Natal. It is actively mined for its coal seams which are found intercalated with fine, greenish-grey to brown mudstones and carbonaceous shales. The mudstones contain layers of fining upward successions of coarse-grained, yellow-white sandstones. Rare limestone lenses are sometimes also found. The mudstones have yielded diverse fossils, mainly of plants such as Phyllotheca, Glossopteris and associated Dictyopteridium. Insect fossils are also found, such as of Neoliomopterum picturatum, various mollusc fossils, fish scales of Coelacanthus dendrites and unidentified ganoid fish scales and teeth. Being upper Permian in age, it correlates with the Normandien and Balfour Formations, but is differentiated from these two formations due to its unique sedimentary facies structure. Unlike the rest of the Beaufort Group sequence, the Emakwezini Formation was deposited in a permanently wet, fluvial-lacustrine environment where peat swamps were present.

Tarkastad Subgroup

There are no equivalent deposits of the Tarkastad Subgroup west of 24°E. This is either due to erosion of the lowlands west of 24°E or sediment deposition in the western section of the Karoo Basin ceased at the end of the Permian. In the lower sections sandstones dominate, especially in the Katberg Formation. In the upper units the sandstone to mudstone ratio steadily evens out. The Tarkastad Subgroup is composed of the following formations (from oldest to youngest):

- Katberg Formation: Dominated by fine to medium-grained sandstones. Alluvial fan and braided river environmental facies.
- Burgersdorp Formation: Very mudstone-rich which are reddish or purple in color.
- Verkykerskop Formation (extreme northeast only): Composed entirely of fine-grained sandstone interbedded with very coarse sandstones.
- Driekoppen Formation (extreme northeast only): Nearly entirely composed of mudstone.

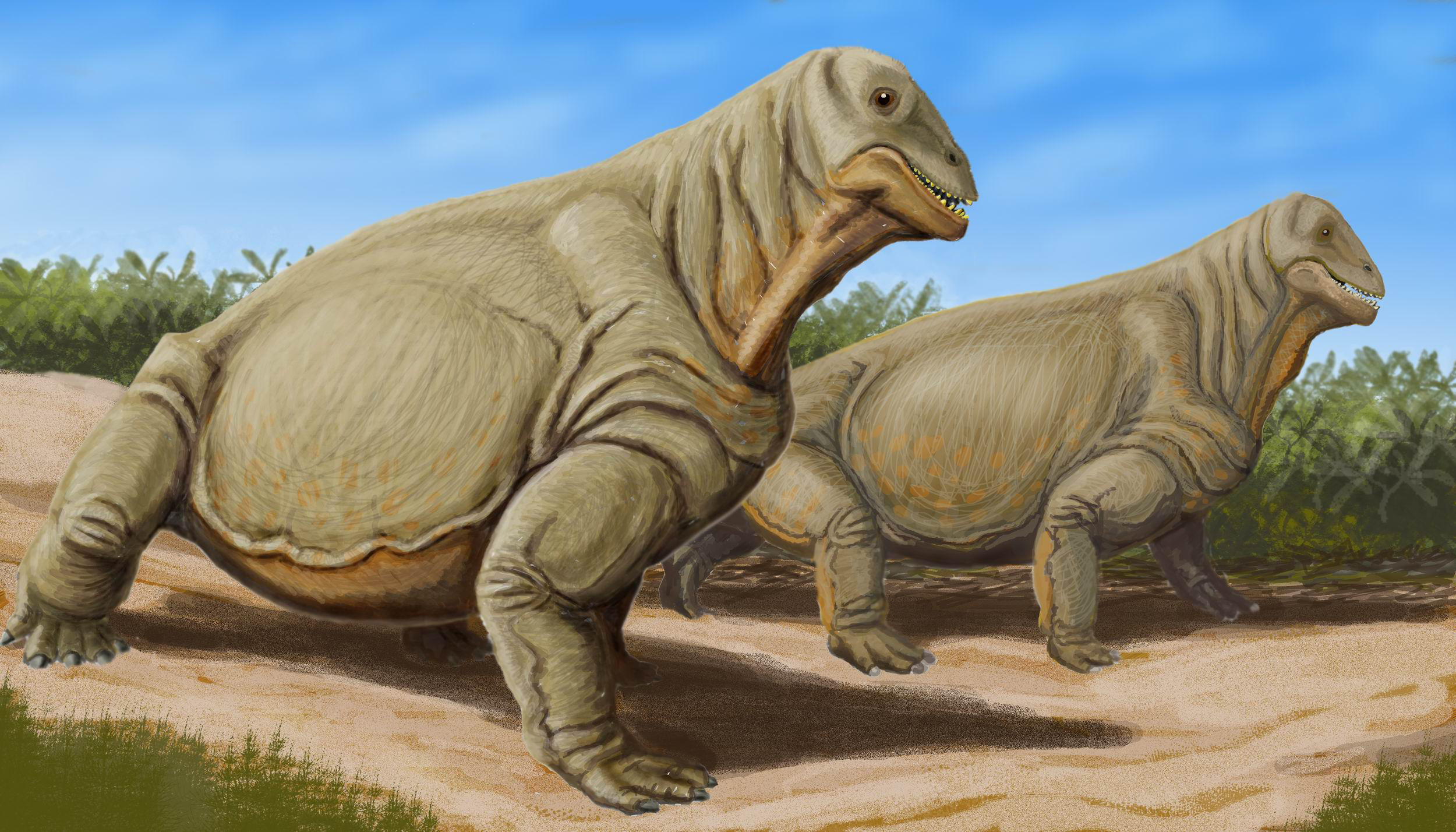
Moschops capensis of the Middle Permian, South Africa.

== Paleontology ==
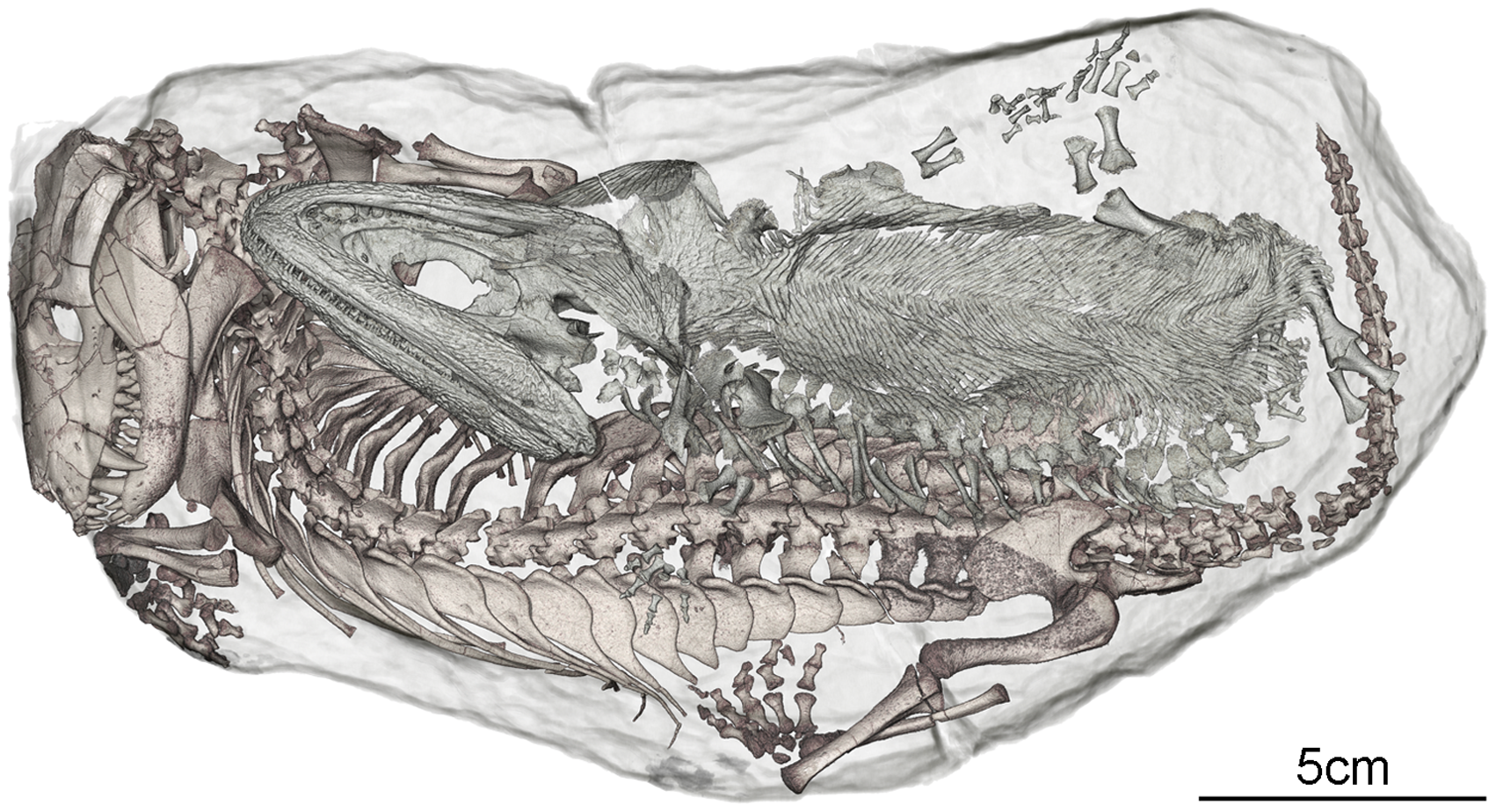
Upper-side 3D rendering of the content inside the burrow cast BP/1/5558 in semi-transparency. Thrinaxodon liorhinus (in brown; BP/1/7199) is lying on its ventral side; Broomistega putterilli (in grey; BP/1/7200) deposited upside down on the right side of the Thrinaxodon. Source: Abdala et al. 2013)

The Beaufort Group is internationally renowned for its diverse fossil fauna, in particular for its therapsid fossils. The entire expanse of this geological group has been categorized into seven fossil biozones or assemblage zones. These assemblage zones are listed below:

- Cynognathus Assemblage Zone (Youngest)
- Lystrosaurus Assemblage Zone
- Daptocephalus Assemblage Zone
- Cistecephalus Assemblage Zone
- Endothiodon Assemblage Zone
- Tapinocephalus Assemblage Zone
- Eodicynodon Assemblage Zone (Oldest)

The Beaufort Group deposits also yield numerous insect, plant, and trace fossils.

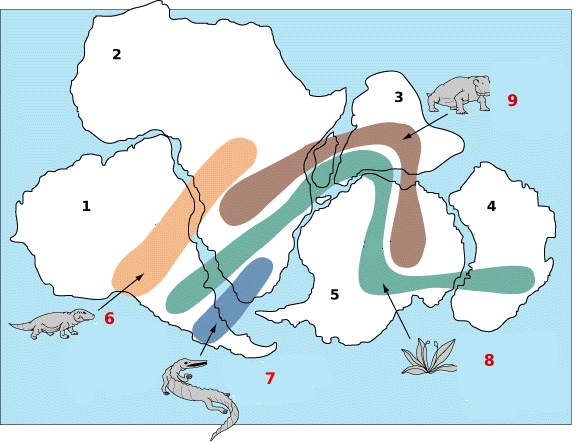
Biostratigraphic correlation of fossils in the greater Gondwana across present-day South America, southern Africa, Antarctica and Australia.

== Correlation ==
The Beaufort Group rocks correlate chronologically with numerous other geological formations and groups within southern Africa and abroad. Most notably from numerous localities in Russia, China, South America, Antarctica, Madagascar, India, and Australia.

== See also ==
- Geology of South Africa
- Geography of South Africa
