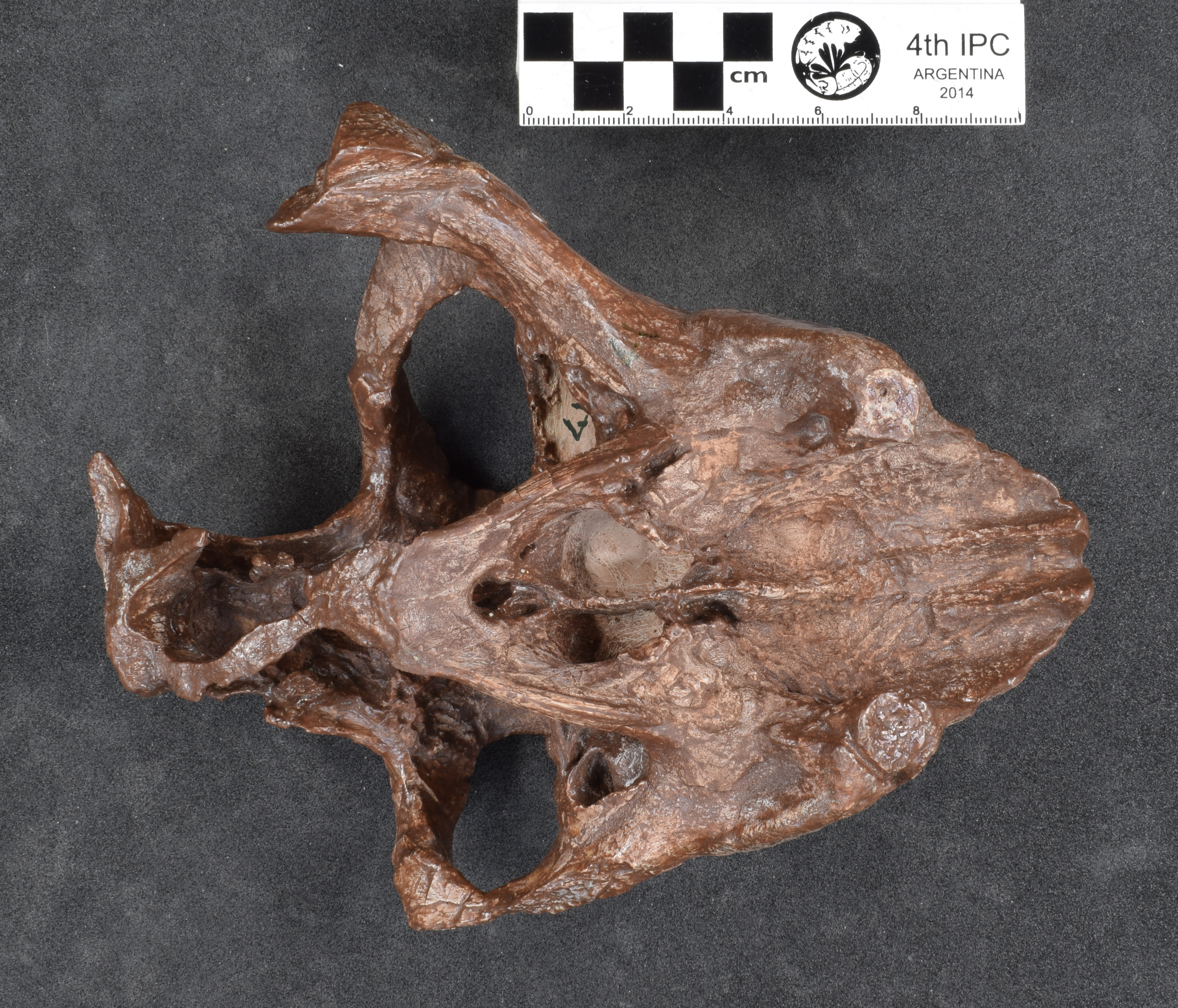
- Skull of Madumabisa opainion (NHMUK PV R 37363) in ventral view (from below)

Scientific classification
- Kingdom: Animalia
- Phylum: Chordata
- Clade: Synapsida
- Clade: Therapsida
- Clade: †Anomodontia
- Clade: †Dicynodontia
- Family: †Lystrosauridae
- Genus: †Madumabisa; Kammerer, Angielczyk & Fröbisch, 2025
- Species: †M. opainion

Binomial name
- †Madumabisa opainion Kammerer, Angielczyk & Fröbisch, 2025

= Madumabisa =

Madumabisa Temporal range: Late Permian (Wuchiapingian-Changhsingian), ~253–252 Ma ?

Extinct genus of dicynodonts

Madumabisa is a genus of dicynodont, an extinct type of therapsid (a group which modern mammals also belong to), that lived in eastern Africa during the Late Permian period. Fossils of Madumabisa have been discovered in what is now Zambia from rocks of the Madumabisa Mudstone Formation, which it is named after. The type and only known species is M. opainion, named in 2025. Madumabisa is an early member of the family Lystrosauridae and a close relative of the well-known and highly specialised Lystrosaurus. The specialised morphology of Lystrosaurus is only incipiently developed in Madumabisa, and it appears transitional between Lystrosaurus and more typical dicynodontoids like Dicynodon. Madumabisa is one of the most abundant species found in the upper Madumabisa Mudstone Formation, demonstrating that lystrosaurids were (at least in some places) major components of late Permian ecosystems that were already thriving prior to the end-Permian mass extinction, rather than only flourishing in its aftermath with the extinction of other dicynodonts.

== History of discovery ==
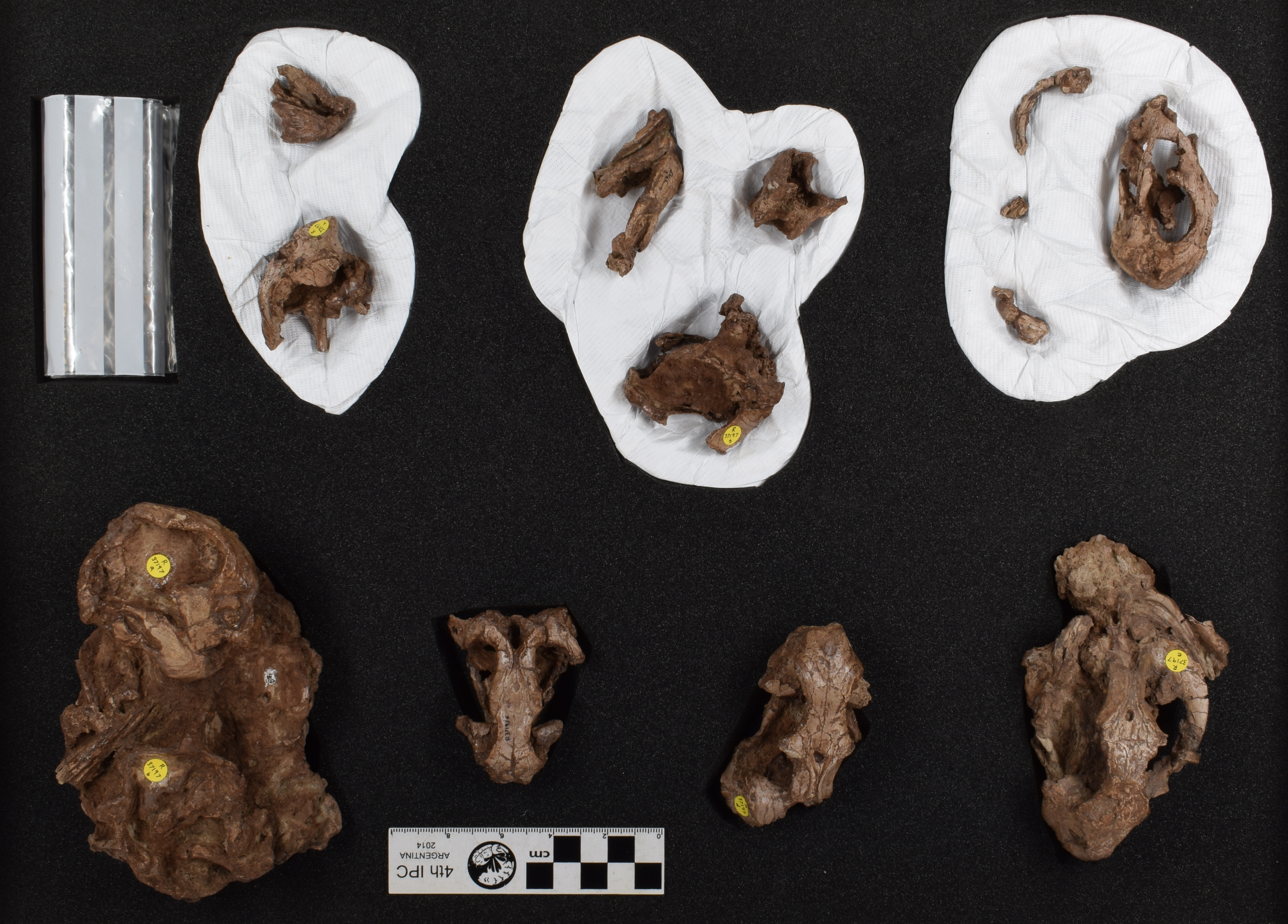
Skulls and mandibles of multiple juvenile Madumabisa (NHMUK PV R 37197a-h)

The first fossils of Madumabisa were collected by Thomas S. Kemp in 1974 on a joint expedition from the University of Oxford and the Geological Survey of Zambia to the Luangwa Basin of northeast Zambia. The fossils were assigned to the genus Dicynodon, which at the time acted as a wastebasket taxon for many Permian dicynodonts. The specimens were tentatively assigned to Dicynodon cf. huenei, a species which has since been reassigned to Daptocephalus. These specimens consist of a partial skull missing the back end, and a collection of eight skulls (six complete) and abundant postcranial remains of young juveniles. These specimens, formerly in T. S. Kemp's own collections in Oxford, are now housed in the Natural History Museum, London (NHMUK).

Madumabisa would not be recognised as its own genus until new fossils were collected during a series of expeditions returning to the Luangwa Basin from 2009 to 2019 by a multi-institutional research group studying the Permo-Triassic fossils of eastern Africa. As of 2025, these specimens are held in the National Heritage Conservation Commission (NHCC) in Lusaka, Zambia, but will be permanently housed in Zambia's Livingstone Museum. Madumabisa was described and named in 2025 by Christian Kammerer, Kenneth Angielczyk and Jörg Fröbisch. The holotype specimen is a nearly complete skull with a femur and partial rib fragments, catalogued as NHCC LB37. Three other nearly complete skulls were collected, NHCC LB206, LB822 (both with lower jaws) and the smaller LB794, as well as the front half of a fourth skull, NHCC LB857. Combined with the specimens collected by Kemp, Madumabisa is known from a nearly complete growth series and is one of the most abundant dicynodonts in the upper Madumabisa Mudstone Formation.

The genus is named after the Madumabisa Mudstone Formation itself due its abundance, which itself is named for "Ndumebiza", a prominent hill in the Hwange District of Zimbabwe where rocks of this formation are also exposed. The specific name opainion is derived from the Ancient Greek words ὀπαῖος (opaios), meaning "with a hole", and ἰνίον (inion), referring to the occipital bone or the back of the skull in general. The combination refers to the unique additional pair of holes in the back of the skull below the post-temporal fenestra in Madumabisa.

All fossils of Madumabisa come from the protected Munyamadzi Game Management Area of the Luangwa Valley of Zambia's Muchinga Province. The fossils were found in the upper layers of the Madumabisa Mudstone Formation, which is exposed in the Luangwa Basin of northeastern Zambia and further south in the Mid-Zambezi Basin along the Zambia-Zimbabwe border. The stratigraphy of the Madumabisa Mudstone Formation has not been formally subdivided, however its fossil fauna is recognised as falling into at least a distinct lower and upper faunal assemblage. These assemblages have been correlated with those of the well-studied framework in the Karoo Basin of South Africa, which correlates the upper Madumabisa Mudstone Formation with the Daptocephalus Assemblage Zone (AZ) of the Karoo. The Daptocephalus AZ has been dated to between 255.2 and roughly 252 million years ago. Within the upper assemblage, fossils of Madumabisa come from the stratigraphically highest (and so the youngest) rocks in the Madumabisa Mudstone Formation. Below them, the fauna is comparable to the Dicynodon-Theriognathus Subzone (Sz) of the Daptocephalus AZ. The abundance of Madumabisa stratigraphically higher may suggest the uppermost portion of the Madumabisa Mudstone Formation correlates to the Lystrosaurus maccaigi-Moschorhinus Sz of the Daptocephalus AZ, paralleling the increase of lystrosaurids in the Karoo. The L. maccaigi-Moschorhinus Sz has been approximately dated to between 253 and 252 million years ago.

== Description ==
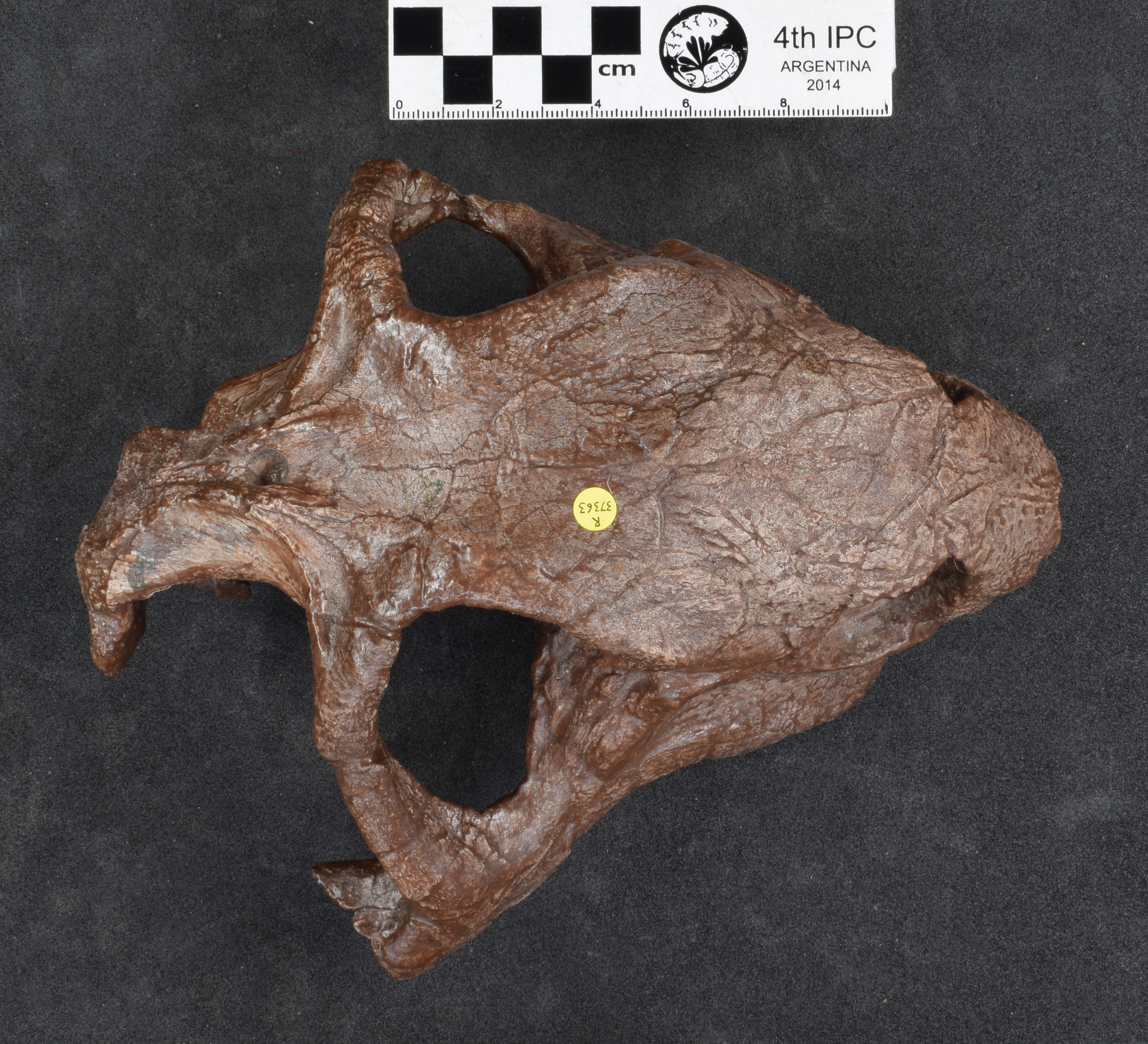
Skull of Madumabisa (NHMUK PV R 37363) in dorsal view (from above). The distinctive anteriorly broad preparietal bone with a spur-like anterior process is discernible in front of the pineal foramen.

Madumabisa is mostly known by its complete skull, including the lower jaws. The largest skulls have lengths approaching 20 centimetres (7.9 in), mid-sized amongst dicynodonts. Some postcranial remains are also known, but they mostly belong to young juveniles (except for a partial femur and rib fragments) and have not been thoroughly prepared or described, and so little can be said of its postcranial anatomy. Like other dicynodonts, Madumabisa has a short snout with a turtle-like beak and only a pair of tusk-like teeth in its jaws.

Madumabisa is characterised by two unique traits (autapomorphies) amongst dicynodonts. Below the post-temporal fenestra on the back side of the skull (the occiput) Madumabisa has an additional pair of deep and well-defined depressions (fossae) excavated into the paroccipital processes, the "paroccipital fossae". Each paroccipital fossa is directly beneath the post-temporal fenestra, and they are separated only by a sharp ridge. No other dicynodonts have paroccipital fossae. Likewise, the shape of the preparietal bone is unique. The preparietal is a singular midline bone unique to dicynodonts and some other therapsids that sits in front of the parietal foramen. In Madumabisa it has a tab-like shape that broadens towards the front, before constricting into a pointed spur at the tip. This shape is unique to Madumabisa, and the front of the preparietal is usually more bluntly rounded in other dicynodonts.

=== Skull ===
Madumabisa has the most generalised skull shape of all recognised lystrosaurids, broadly resembling that of Dicynodon and other "Dicynodon-grade" taxa (i.e. non-kannemeyeriiform, non-lystrosaurid dicynodontoids) instead of the highly specialised morphologies of other lystrosaurids. For example, the intertemporal bar (the strut of the skull between the two temporal fenestra) is narrow with the midline parietal bones compressed together, typical of "Dicynodon-grade" taxa but unlike the wide and flat intetemporal bar of Lystrosaurus. Likewise, the pineal foramen (the opening of the parietal or "third" eye) is smaller than in Lystrosaurus but like Dicynodon. The secondary palate of the premaxillary beak is also more like Dicynodon than other lystrosaurids—the paired palatal ridges at the front are not as narrowly spaced as in Lystrosaurus and are joined to the midline posterior ridge behind them by a broad, flat plate that is not found in Lystrosaurus. Madumabisa also has a distinct ectopterygoid bone in the palate, present in most dicynodontoids but characteristically absent in Lystrosaurus.

Nonetheless, Madumabisa still shows incipient development of some characteristic lystrosaurid features. The snout is deflected downwards, with the rim of the beak drawn down below the level of the eyes and nostrils compared to Dicynodon-grade taxa, but only slightly so relative to the extreme condition of Lystrosaurus. The orbits (eye sockets) are relatively larger than "Dicynodon-grade" dicynodontoids, as in other lystrosaurids. The septomaxilla, a bone found in the nostril of various early tetrapods, has a thin extension reaching out of the naris to meet the lacrimal (a bone in front of the eye), narrowly separating the maxilla from the nasal bone above. This contact is not present in non-lystrosaurid Permian dicynodontoids. On the palate, the premaxilla is almost completely separated from the palatine bone by an extension of the maxilla, which completely separates them in Lystrosaurus. The interpterygoid vacuity (a space between the two front arms of the pterygoid bones) is very low, almost level with the median pterygoid plate behind it (where the pterygoids join) as in Lystrosaurus but not Dicynodon or the lystrosaurid Euptychognathus.

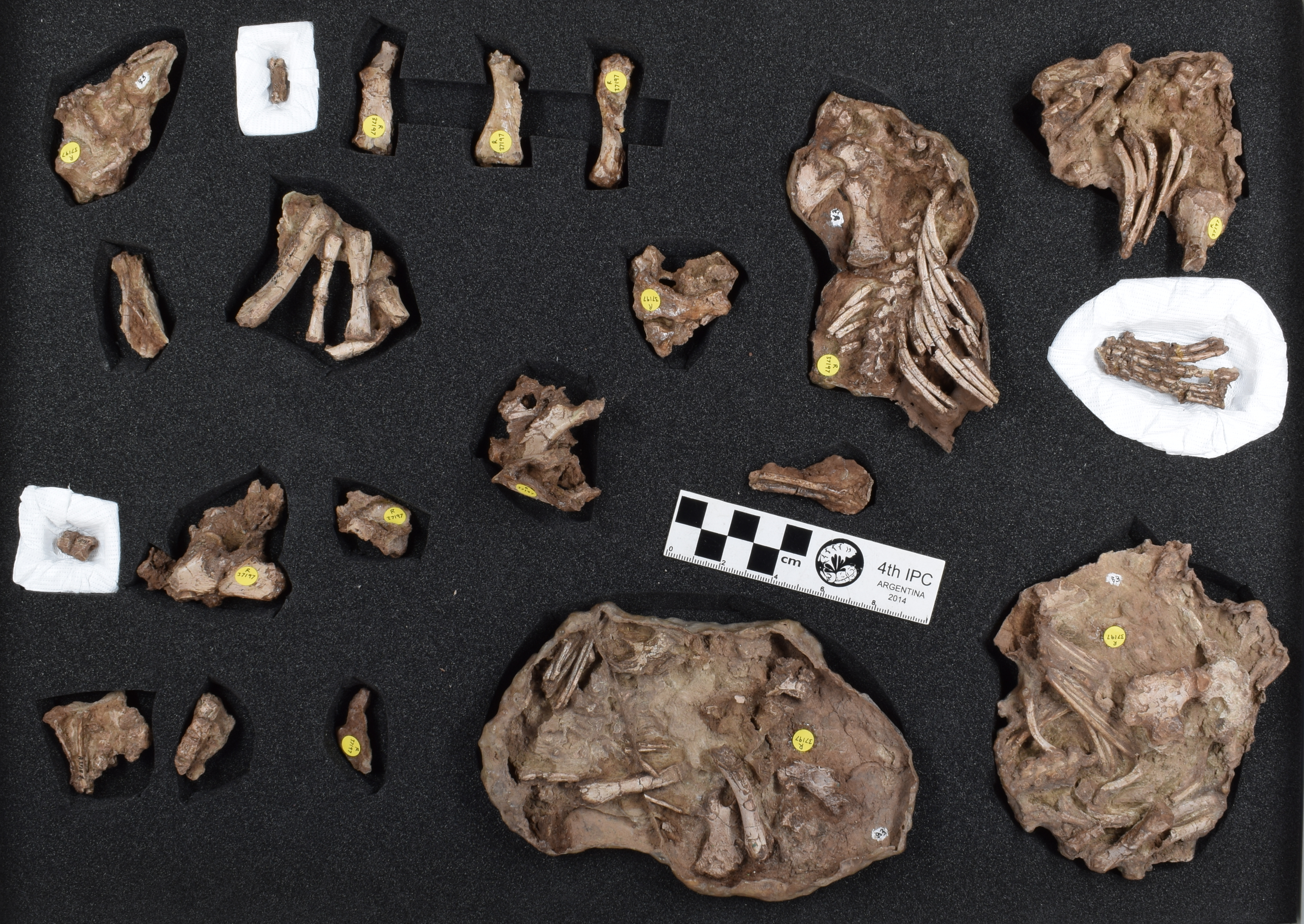
Postcranial remains of multiple juvenile Madumabisa (NHMUK PV R 17197)

The skull of Madumabisa is relatively lightly built and unornamented compared to other lystrosaurids and Permian dicynodontoids. The postorbital bars that rim the back of the orbit are relatively narrow and unornamented by thickened bosses as in some other dicynodonts. Bosses are present on the prefrontal bones in front of the eyes that project outwards, typical of many dicynodontoids, but they are relatively narrow front-to-back as in Lystrosaurus, albeit not as strongly developed. A single rugose nasal boss is also present on top of the snout, typical of dicynodontoids, though it is not greatly developed. The caniniform processes, bony extensions of the maxilla that house the tusks, are relatively narrow and lack a lateral buttress projecting out laterally beyond the width of the tusk. The premaxilla lacks a median ridge found in most species of Lystrosaurus and many other "Dicynodon-grade" taxa, save for a slight ridge at the highest point of the premaxilla. There is a distinct keel along the bottom of the front end of each anterior pterygoid arm, unlike Euptychognathus.

=== Mandible ===
Relative to the skull, the mandible of Madumabisa is much more like that of Lystrosaurus, with a relatively short and deep symphysis at the tip where the two dentary bones are fused together. The lateral dentary shelf, a site for jaw muscle attachment in dicynodonts, starts out thickened and diffuse in front of the mandibular fenestra, but becomes extremely thin and sheet-like where it forms the upper border of the fenestra. Due to its extreme thinness, the rear edge of the fenestra is tapers to an upward curving point, creating an airfoil shape (as seen in some Lystrosaurus specimens) compared to the oval opening typical of dicynodontoids. Above the anterior edge of the shelf, the dentary bears rugged, corrugated muscle scars, a feature characteristic of lystrosaurids. The rest of the mandible is otherwise typical of bidentalian dicynodonts.

== Classification ==
Madumabisa is a member of the family Lystrosauridae under hierarchical Linnaean taxonomy, which is defined phylogenetically as the clade of dicynodonts more closely related to Lystrosaurus than to Dicynodon or the Triassic kannemeyeriiforms. A phylogenetic analysis by Kammerer and colleagues in 2025 found Madumabisa as the sister taxon to the two species of Euptychognathus in a subclade at the base of the Lystrosauridae. However, the authors noted that some traits of Madumabisa are more like those of Lystrosaurus than Euptychognathus (such as the maxilla separating the premaxilla and palatines and the low interpterygoid vacuity), which may indicate it is in fact more closely related to Lystrosaurus instead.

The cladogram below depicts the simplified results of the phylogenetic analysis in Kammerer et al. (2025):

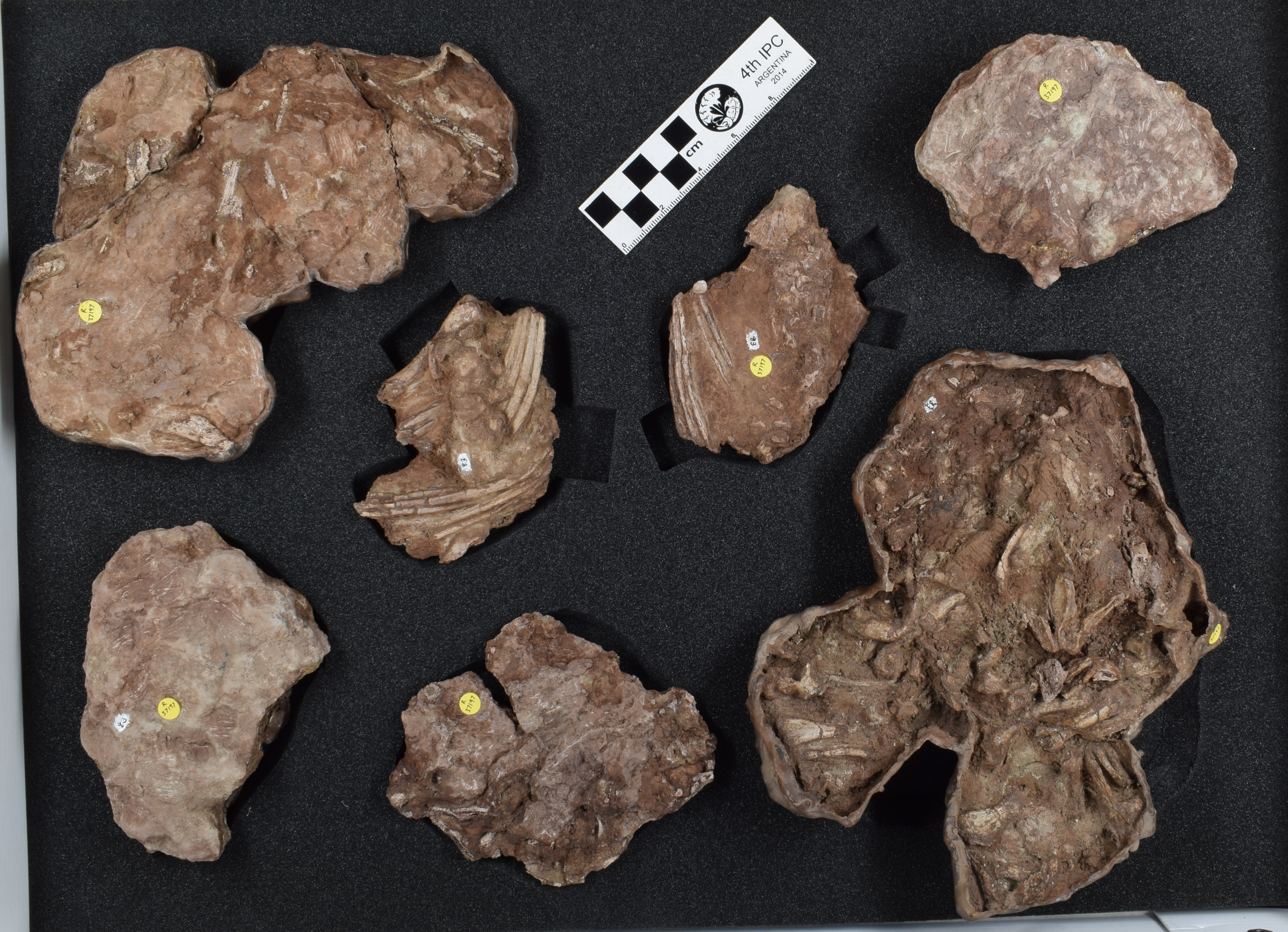
Blocks of unprepared postcranial bones of multiple juvenile Madumabisa (NHMUK PV R 37197)

- Dicynodontoidea
  - Taoheodon
  - - - Repelinosaurus
      - Counillonia
    - - Dicynodon spp.
      - - - Delectosaurus
          - Vivaxosaurus
        - - Lystrosauridae
            - - Madumabisa
              - - Euptychognathus bathyrhynchus
                - Euptychognathus kingae
            - - Lystrosauravus
              - Lystrosaurus spp.
          - - - Basilodon
              - Sintocephalus
            - - - Syops
                - - Jimusaria spp.
                  - - Gordonia
                    - Keyseria
              - - - Peramodon
                  - - Daptocephalus spp.
                    - - Dinanomodon
                      - Turfanodon spp.
                - Kannemeyeriiformes

== Palaeoecology ==
At the time the upper Madumabisa Mudstone Formation was being deposited, the palaeoenvironment of the Luangwa Valley basin consisted of floodplains in a rift valley with scattered lakes surrounding highly sinuous meandering rivers. The environment was relatively drier than it was earlier in the Permian, with more pronounced periods of rainfall and drought, long enough for vertisol soils to develop. Flooding from crevasse splays and alluvial fans would sporadically cover the floodplains. Conversely, lake deposits are rarer than they were previously, the drier climate not being able to sustain perennial lakes as it once did. From the preserved soils, the climate has been estimated to have been subhumid.

A variety of other therapsids are known from the upper Madumabisa Mudstone Formation. Many of these genera correlate with the Daptocephalus Assemblage Zone of the Karoo basin, namely the "Dicynodon-grade" dicynodontoids Daptocephalus sp., Dicynodon angielczyki and Di. cf. lacerticeps, the small emydopoid dicynodonts Compsodon and Digalodon, as well as the therocephalian Theriognathus and the cynodont Procynosuchus. However, Madumabisa is only known from the uppermost layers of the formation and it is unclear if it would have lived contemporaneously with these taxa. Madumabisa did coexist with both species of the fellow lystrosaurid Euptychognathus, the wide-headed E. kingae and taller-skulled E. bathyrhynchus. Such an abundance of lystrosaurids in the uppermost Madumabisa Mudstone Formation may suggest the ecosystem at the time more closely resembled the Lystrosaurus maccaigi-Moschorhinus Subzone of the Karoo. Madumabisa may have been part of a faunal assemblage that was distinct from the rest of the upper Madumabisa Mudstone Formation fauna.

Regardless of this potential discrepancy, the fauna of the upper Madumabisa Mudstone Formation is very similar to the Daptocephalus AZ of the Karoo. Additional dicynodonts include the giant rhachiocephalid Kitchinganomodon, the enigmatic Syops, and the smaller Dicynodontoides and widespread Diictodon. The largest predators are rubidgeine gorgonopsians, Rubidgea, Dinogorgon, and possibly Aelurognathus (though this potentially represents the non-rubidgeine Smilesaurus instead). Smaller gorgonopsians (Arctognathus, Cyonosaurus sp., Scylacognathus sp.) and the biarmosuchian Isengops were mid-sized predators, whilst the smallest carnivores were therocephalians such as Ichibengops, Ictidosuchoides and Mupashi.

Of these taxa, Aulacephalodon, Compsodon and Digalodon only occur low in the upper Madumabisa Mudstone Formation, and so presumably would not have overlapped in time with Madumabisa.
