= Lystrosauravus =

Lystrosauravus Temporal range: Late Permian (Wuchiapingian) ~256.6–255.24 Ma

Scientific classification
- Kingdom: Animalia
- Phylum: Chordata
- Clade: Synapsida
- Clade: Therapsida
- Clade: †Anomodontia
- Clade: †Dicynodontia
- Family: †Lystrosauridae
- Genus: †Lystrosauravus; Kammerer, Angielczyk & Fröbisch, 2025
- Species: †L. bothae

Binomial name
- †Lystrosauravus bothae Kammerer, Angielczyk & Fröbisch, 2025

Extinct genus of dicynodonts

Lystrosauravus (from Lystrosaurus and avus, "grandfather") is a genus of lystrosaurid dicynodont, an extinct type of therapsid (a group which modern mammals also belong to), that lived in what is now the Karoo Basin of South Africa during the late Permian (Lopingian) period. The type and only species is L. bothae, named after Professor Jennifer Botha. Lystrosauravus broadly resembles and is closely related to Lystrosaurus, including the specialised deep and deflected snout, but retains some ancestral traits found in other dicynodontoids and appears transitional towards the distinctive morphology of Lystrosaurus. Lystrosauravus is the oldest recognised lystrosaurid, dating back to the Cistecephalus Assemblage Zone roughly between 256.6 and 255.24 million years ago. Lystrosauravus is rare in these deposits despite extensive collection by palaeontologists, suggesting it was either a rare component of the ecosystem or typically inhabited a different environment beyond the preserved assemblage.

== History of discovery ==
Lystrosauravus is known solely from the holotype specimen CGP/1/324 (also catalogued as CGS WB 227) housed in the Council for Geoscience in Pretoria (CGP/CGS), South Africa. It is a poorly preserved partial skull missing most of the right side, part of the palate, and lacking the lower jaw. Much of its surface is cracked, obscuring details of the sutures between bones, while the surface of the palate has been eroded. It was described as a new genus and species in 2025 by palaeontologists Christian F. Kammerer, Kenneth D. Angielczyk and Jörg Fröbisch. The genus is named directly after its close relative Lystrosaurus, combining its name with the Latin word avus, meaning "grandfather", referring to their close relationship and its older age. The species is named after Professor Jennifer Botha to honour her extensive work on Lystrosaurus and on Permo-Triassic fossils of the Karoo Basin in general.

CGP/1/324 was discovered on Middelwater farm in the Pearston district of the Eastern Cape Province in South Africa. The rocks exposed in this region belong to the Cistecephalus Assemblage Zone, which has had its age constrained roughly between 256.6 and 255.24 million years ago during the Wuchiapingian stage of the late Permian period (Lopingian). This pre-dates the first appearance of Lystrosaurus in the Karoo Basin later in the upper Daptocephalus Assemblage Zone, as well as other Permian lystrosaurids globally that also only appear in rocks correlated to the Daptocephalus AZ. Despite being historically heavily collected and well-sampled for roughly a century, CGP/1/324 is the only fossil of Lystrosauravus ever collected from the Cistecephalus AZ.

== Description ==
Lystrosauravus broadly resembles its close relative and namesake Lystrosaurus, especially the two Permian species Lystrosaurus maccaigi and L. curvatus. The snout is short in length but it is strongly deflected and deeply elongated downwards below the nostrils, more so than any other lystrosaurid except Lystrosaurus itself. The orbits (openings for the eyes) are large like those of Lystrosaurus, more so than those of other lystrosaurids and dicynodontoids. Compared to Lystrosaurus its skull is relatively broader, flaring outwards below the eyes with wide temporal fenestra, superficially resembling the lystrosaurid Euptychognathus kingae. It is a mid-sized dicynodont, with a skull length of roughly 19.5 centimetres (7.7 in).

A notable difference between Lystrosauravus and Lystrosaurus is that the intertemporal bar (the roof of the skull between the temporal fenestra) is narrow and the parietal bones down the middle are compressed together between the postorbital bones. This is typical of most dicynodonts, including those lystrosaurids evolved from, but unlike the characteristically broad, flattened intertemporal bar of Lystrosaurus itself. Another distinctive difference is the size of the squamosal bone which rims the back of the eye and forms much of the outside wall of the temporal fenestra. The squamosal of Lystrosauravus is exceptionally deep below the eyes, matched only by the largest specimens of L. maccaigi and L. curvatus, and uniquely takes up almost the entire bottom edge of the orbit. The squamosal also broadly expands outwards below the postorbital bar as in E. kingae, giving it a similarly wide head.

The palate likewise shows a mix of ancestral and derived features shared with Lystrosaurus. The premaxilla, forming most of the secondary palate of the beak up front, is separated from the palatine bone behind by a palatal extension of the maxilla (which mostly forms the side of the snout and houses the tusks). This is a characteristic feature of Lystrosaurus, and the premaxilla and palatine are only partly separated in other lystrosaurids. Further back, where the two pterygoid bones meet and fuse behind the internal nostrils (choanae) they form a very wide median plate, again like Lystrosaurus and broader than in other lystrosaurids. However, Lystrosauravus retains a distinct ectopterygoid bone on the outer face of the pterygoid where it meets the maxilla and jugal, a bone lost in Lystrosaurus but still found in other lystrosaurids and related dicynodontoids.

The skull is relatively unornamented compared to Lystrosaurus. The snout is damaged, though there is no sign of a midline ridge on what is preserved on the premaxilla and there are no bony knobs or a horizontal ridge running across the suture between the nasal and frontal bones as found in Lystrosaurus (except L. curvatus). Lystrosauravus does possess bony bosses on the prefrontal bones, and like Lystrosaurus they are narrowly compressed front-to-back and project outwards in front of the eyes. The postorbital bars are also swollen near the top, as in L. maccaigi. The caniniform processes of the maxilla that would house the tusks are swollen outwards as lateral buttresses that have a roughened texture.

== Classification ==
Lystrosauravus is recognised as a close relative of Lystrosaurus and is included within the same taxonomic family, Lystrosauridae. A phylogenetic analysis performed by Kammerer, Angielczyk and Fröbisch in its description in 2025 corroborates this relationship and recovered it as the sister taxon of Lystrosaurus itself, with strong support for this relationship amongst lystrosaurids. The cladogram below depicts the simplified results of the phylogenetic analysis in Kammerer et al. (2025):

- Dicynodontoidea
  - Taoheodon
  - - - Repelinosaurus
      - Counillonia
    - - Dicynodon spp.
      - - - Delectosaurus
          - Vivaxosaurus
        - - Lystrosauridae
            - - Madumabisa
              - - Euptychognathus bathyrhynchus
                - Euptychognathus kingae
            - - Lystrosauravus
              - - Lystrosaurus hedini
                - - Lystrosaurus curvatus
                  - - Lystrosaurus maccaigi
                    - - Lystrosaurus declivis
                      - Lystrosaurus murrayi
          - - - Basilodon
              - Sintocephalus
            - - - Syops
                - - Jimusaria spp.
                  - - Gordonia
                    - Keyseria
              - - - Peramodon
                  - - Daptocephalus spp.
                    - - Dinanomodon gilli
                      - Turfanodon spp.
                - Kannemeyeriiformes

== Palaeoecology ==
Lystrosauravus was a member of the Cistecephalus Assemblage Zone (AZ) fauna. The palaeoenvironment consisted largely of floodplains surrounding numerous relatively straight (i.e. not meandering) streams and rivers, interspersed with localised wetlands surrounding perennial lakes. Lystrosauravus appears to have been a rare component of the ecosystem, as only one fossil has been discovered so far despite substantial collecting of this assemblage. It is unclear if is this is because Lystrosauravus was scarce as a species or if instead it was not a typical member of the Cistecephalus AZ environment. It is possible that the distinctive anatomy of Lystrosauravus (and by extension Lystrosaurus) was a specialisation for living in marginal environments with more limited resources than in the typical healthy ecosystem of the Cistecephalus AZ. Alternatively, Lystrosauravus may have been a specialist that fed on particular types of plant that were less common in the Cistecephalus AZ before the ecological disruptions of the Permian-Triassic mass extinction when Lystrosaurus began to thrive.

The fossil record of the Cistecephalus AZ otherwise preserves a diverse community of other dicynodonts, gorgonopsians and other predatory therapsids, reptiles and amphibians. Contemporary dicynodonts range from the small and mole-like Cistecephalus and Cistecephaloides, small emydopoids such as Emydops, Emydorhinus, Palemydops, Dicynodontoides, and Digalodon, the burrower Diictodon, through mid to large-sized bidentalians such as the cryptodonts Oudenodon, Odontocyclops and Pelanomodon, the dicynodontoids Dicynodon and Dinanomodon, the enigmatic Keyseria, Basilodon, and Sintocephalus, Endothiodon, and up to the giant rhachiocephalids Rhachiocephalus and Kitchinganomodon and the geikiid Aulacephalodon.

Giant gorgonopsians, such as Smilesaurus, Aelurognathus and the rubidgeines Rubidgea, Dinogorgon and Leontosaurus, were the largest predators, but they filled a range of body sizes down through Arctops, Arctognathus, Sycosaurus and Lycaenops, to the smallest Scylacocephalus, Aloposaurus and Cyonosaurus. Other small to mid-sized predators included a variety of biarmosuchians, Lemurosaurus, Herpetoskylax (potentially including Rubidgina), Paraburnetia and Lycaenodon. Therocephalians were also abundant smaller predators and insectivores, including four whaitsioids (Ophidostoma, Theriognathus, Mirotenthes and Hofmeyria), two akidnognathids (Proalopecopsis and the small and potentially venomous Euchambersia), and a variety of small baurioids (Ictidosuchoides, Ictidosuchops, Polycynodon, and the bizarre Choerosaurus). A single early cynodont, Cyonosaurus, was also present.

Among the reptiles (sauropsids), armoured herbivorous pareiasaurs are represented by the large Pareiasaurus and Pareiasuchus, and the diminutive Anthodon, Nanoparia and Pumiliopareia. Smaller reptiles include Owenetta (a procolophonoid, related to pareiasaurs) and Milleretta, both superficially lizard-like, and the carnivorous neodiapsid Youngina. Only three genera of semi-aquatic temnospondyl amphibians are known, the rhinesuchids Rhinesuchus and two species of Rhinesuchoides. They shared the waterways with two genera of fish, Atherstonia and Namaichthys.
