= Madumabisa Mudstone Formation =

Geologic formation in Zambia and Zimbabwe

- Stratigraphic range: Capitanian?–Wuchiapingian, ~264–254 Ma
- Type: Geological formation
- Underlies: Escarpment Grit, Ntawere Formation
- Overlies: Luwumbu Formation, Gwembe Coal Formation

Lithology
- Primary: Mudstone

Location
- Country: Zambia, Zimbabwe

Type section
- Named for: Ndumebiza (Madume), Hwange District, Zimbabwe
- Named by: Lightfoot (1914)

The Madumabisa Mudstone Formation is a geologic formation in the Middle to Late Permian of Zambia and Zimbabwe. It comprises ancient lake and river mudstone exposed in two sedimentary basins: the Mid-Zambezi Basin (on the Zambia-Zimbabwe border) and the Luangwa Basin (in northeast Zambia).

Though understudied for many years, the exposures of the Luangwa Basin are among the best records of Late Permian fossils in the world. The upper member of the Madumabisa Mudstone Formation has produced many species of synapsids (animals distantly related to mammals). Dicynodonts (herbivores with tusks and beaks) and gorgonopsians (saber-toothed predators) are particularly common. Similar species are found in the even more fossil-rich Karoo Basin of South Africa, assisting age correlation between the two regions.

== Age and regional correlations ==
The age of the Madumabisa Mudstone must be estimated from its fossil fauna, which can then be compared to the strata of the Karoo Basin in South Africa.

=== Lower member ===
The lower member of the Madumabisa Mudstone has rare fossils of tapinocephalids, similar to the Tapinocephalus Assemblage Zone (TAZ) of the Karoo, about 265–260 million years ago (Ma). In other words, from the Capitanian stage of the Middle Permian (Guadalupian) epoch. The early dicynodont Abajudon is also found in the R1 member of the Ruhuhu Formation in Tanzania.

=== Upper member ===
The upper member of the Madumabisa Mudstone seems to have two distinct fossil-rich intervals in the Luangwa Basin, a lower and upper assemblage. The lower assemblage has an abundance of Oudenodon, Diictodon, and Pristerodon, alongside other dicynodonts such as Kembawacela, Endothiodon, and Odontocyclops. In the Karoo, Endothiodon and Odontocyclops only coexist near the end of the Endothiodon Assemblage Zone (EAZ), a little older than 256 Ma. In other words, about mid-way through the Wuchiapingian stage of the Late Permian (Lopingian) epoch. EAZ taxa such as Endothiodon and Gorgonops have also been found in the Mid-Zambezi Basin. Aulacephalodon is only found in a narrow band of strata between the two major assemblages. A distinct middle assemblage may be supported or refuted by future sampling. If valid, it will probably be equivalent to the Karoo's Cistecephalus Assemblage Zone (CAZ, about 256–255 Ma).

The upper assemblage has an abundance of Dicynodon, alongside other dicynodonts (Daptocephalus, Compsodon, Digalodon) and other distinctive synapsids (Theriognathus, Procynosuchus). These fossils are most consistent with the Karoo's Dicynodon–Theriognathus subzone of the Daptocephalus Assemblage Zone (DAZ), about 255–254 Ma. The DAZ extends from the later part of the Wuchiapingian stage into the succeeding Changhsingian stage. Lystrosaurids (Euptychognathus, Madumabisa) are more common than other dicynodonts in the youngest layers of the formation, hinting at a slight overlap with the Lystrosaurus maccaigi subzone of the DAZ. There is no direct evidence that the Permian-Triassic boundary is preserved in the Madumabisa Mudstone Formation

== Paleobiota ==
From Peecook et al. (2025) unless cited otherwise:

=== Synapsids ===
==== Dinocephalians ====
Dinocephalians of the Madumabisa Mudstone Formation
Genus / Taxon	Species	Strata	Location	Notes	Images
Anteosauridae indet.		Lower MMF	Mid-Zambezi Basin (Zimbabwe)	A snout fragment, possibly from an anteosaurid dinocephalian.	
Criocephalosaurus	C. gunyankaensis	Lower MMF	Mid-Zambezi Basin (Zimbabwe)	A dubious dinocephalian based on poorly-preserved skull material which is now missing.	
Tapinocephalidae indet.		Lower MMF	Mid-Zambezi Basin (Zambia, Zimbabwe)	Teeth and jaw fragments from tapinocephalid dinocephalians. A partial skull has also been found in Zimbabwe.	

==== Biarmosuchians ====
Biarmosuchians of the Madumabisa Mudstone Formation
Genus / Taxon	Species	Strata	Location	Notes	Images
Biarmosuchia indet.		Upper MMF (lower assemblage)	Luangwa Basin (Zambia)	A medium-sized biarmosuchian skull similar to Herpetoskylax and Lycaenodon.	
Bondoceras	B. bulborhynchus	Lower MMF	Mid-Zambezi Basin (Zambia)	A burnetiid biarmosuchian.	
Isengops	I. luangwensis	Upper MMF (upper assemblage)	Luangwa Basin (Zambia)	A medium-sized burentiamorph biarmosuchian with tall horns above its eyes.	
Mobaceras	M. zambeziense	Lower MMF	Mid-Zambezi Basin (Zambia)	A burnetiid biarmosuchian.	
Wantulignathus	W. gwembensis	Lower MMF	Mid-Zambezi Basin (Zambia)	An unusual blunt-snouted biarmosuchian.	

==== Dicynodonts ====
Dicynodonts of the Madumabisa Mudstone Formation
Genus / Taxon	Species	Strata	Location	Notes	Images
Abajudon	A. kaayai	Lower MMF	Mid-Zambezi Basin (Zambia)	A small endothiodont.	
Aulacephalodon	A. kapoliwacela	Upper MMF (both assemblages?)	Luangwa Basin (Zambia)	A large geikiid cryptodont.	
Compsodon	C. helmoedi	Upper MMF (upper assemblage)	Luangwa Basin (Zambia)	A small emydopid emydopoid.	
Daptocephalus	D. sp.	Upper MMF (upper assemblage)	Luangwa Basin (Zambia)	A medium-sized dicynodontoid.	
Dicynodon	D. angielczyki	Upper MMF (upper assemblage)	Luangwa Basin (Zambia)	A medium-sized dicynodontoid.	
Dicynodon	D. cf. D. lacerticeps	Upper MMF (upper assemblage)	Luangwa Basin (Zambia)	A medium-sized dicynodontoid.	
Dicynodontoides	D. cf. D. nowacki	Upper MMF (both assemblages)	Luangwa Basin (Zambia)	A medium-sized kingoriid emydopoid.	
Digalodon	D. cf. D. rubidgei	Upper MMF (upper assemblage)	Luangwa Basin (Zambia)	A small emydopoid.	
Diictodon	D. feliceps	Upper MMF (both assemblages)	Luangwa Basin (Zambia)	A small pylaecephalid.	
Emydops	E. sp.	Upper MMF (lower assemblage)	Luangwa Basin (Zambia)	A small emydopid emydopoid.	
Emydorhinus?	E.? sp.	Upper MMF (lower assemblage)	Luangwa Basin (Zambia)	A small emydopoid.	
Endothiodon	E. sp.	Lower–Upper MMF (lower assemblage)	Mid-Zambezi Basin (Zambia, Zimbabwe), Luangwa Basin (Zambia)	A large endothiodont.	
Euptychognathus	E. kingae	Upper MMF (upper assemblage)	Luangwa Basin (Zambia)	A medium-sized lystrosaurid.	
cf. Katumbia	cf. K. parringtoni	Upper MMF (upper assemblage)	Luangwa Basin (Zambia)	A medium-sized elphid bidentalian.	
Kembawacela	K. kitchingi	Upper MMF (lower assemblage)	Luangwa Basin (Zambia)	A small cistecephalid emydopoid.	
Kitchinganomodon	K. crassus	Upper MMF (upper assemblage)	Luangwa Basin (Zambia)	A large rhachiocephalid cryptodont.	
Madumabisa	M. opainion	Upper MMF (upper assemblage)	Luangwa Basin (Zambia)	A medium-sized lystrosaurid.	
Odontocyclops	O. whaitsi	Upper MMF (lower assemblage)	Luangwa Basin (Zambia)	A very large cryptodont.	
Oudenodon	O. bainii	Upper MMF (lower assemblage)	Luangwa Basin (Zambia)	A large oudenodontid cryptodont.	
Pristerodon	P. mackayi	Lower–Upper MMF (lower assemblage)	Mid-Zambezi Basin (Zimbabwe), Luangwa Basin (Zambia)	A small dicynodont.	
Syops	S. vanhoepeni	Upper MMF (both assemblages)	Luangwa Basin (Zambia)	A large bidentalian, endemic to the Luangwa Basin.	

==== Gorgonopsians ====
Gorgonopsians of the Madumabisa Mudstone Formation
Genus / Taxon	Species	Strata	Location	Notes	Images
Aelurognathus	A. tigriceps	Upper MMF (lower assemblage)	Luangwa Basin (Zambia)	A large rubidgein gorgonopsian.	
Aelurognathus	A. sp.	Upper MMF (upper assemblage)	Luangwa Basin (Zambia)	A large rubidgein gorgonopsian. This upper assemblage specimen may be referred to either Aelurognathus or Smilesaurus.	
Arctognathus	A. curvimola	Upper MMF (upper assemblage)	Luangwa Basin (Zambia)	A small gorgonopsian.	
Arctops	A. umulunshi	Upper MMF (lower assemblage)	Luangwa Basin (Zambia)	A medium-sized gorgonopsian.	
Cyonosaurus	C. sp.	Upper MMF (upper assemblage)	Luangwa Basin (Zambia)	A medium-sized gorgonopsian.	
Dinogorgon	D. sp.	Upper MMF (upper assemblage)	Luangwa Basin (Zambia)	A very large rubidgein gorgonopsian.	
cf. Dixeya	cf. D. sp.	Upper MMF (upper assemblage)	Luangwa Basin (Zambia)	A small gorgonopsian.	
Gorgonops	G. sp.	Upper MMF (lower assemblage)	Mid-Zambezi Basin (Zambia)	A medium-sized gorgonopsian.	
Lycaenops	L. sp.	Upper MMF (lower assemblage)	Luangwa Basin (Zambia)	A medium-sized gorgonopsian.	
Rubidgea	R. atrox	Upper MMF (upper assemblage)	Luangwa Basin (Zambia)	A large rubidgein gorgonopsian.	
Scylacocephalus	S. sp.	Upper MMF (both assemblages)	Luangwa Basin (Zambia)	A small gorgonopsian.	
Sycosaurus	S. laticeps	Upper MMF (lower assemblage)	Luangwa Basin (Zambia)	A very large rubidgein gorgonopsian. Sycosaurus-like gorgonopsian material has also been reported from Zimbabwe.	

==== Therocephalians ====
Therocephalians of the Madumabisa Mudstone Formation
Genus / Taxon	Species	Strata	Location	Notes	Images
Ichibengops	I. munyamadziensis	Upper MMF (upper assemblage)	Luangwa Basin (Zambia)	A small chthonosaurid therocephalian.	
Ictidosuchoides	I. longiceps	Upper MMF (upper assemblage)	Luangwa Basin (Zambia)	A small baurioid therocephalian.	
Ictidosuchoides	cf. I. sp.	Upper MMF (lower assemblage)	Luangwa Basin (Zambia)	A small baurioid therocephalian.	
Mupashi	M. migrator	Upper MMF (upper assemblage)	Luangwa Basin (Zambia)	A small karenitid therocephalian.	
Theriognathus	T. microps	Upper MMF (upper assemblage)	Luangwa Basin (Zambia)	A medium-sized whaitsiid therocephalian.	

==== Cynodonts ====
Cynodonts of the Madumabisa Mudstone Formation
Genus / Taxon	Species	Strata	Location	Notes	Images
Nshimbodon	N. muchingaensis	Upper MMF (lower assemblage)	Luangwa Basin (Zambia)	A small charassognathid cynodont.	
Procynosuchus	P. delaharpeae	Upper MMF (upper assemblage)	Luangwa Basin (Zambia)	A medium-sized procynosuchid cynodont.	

=== Other tetrapods ===
Other tetrapods (reptiles and amphibians) of the Madumabisa Mudstone Formation
Genus / Taxon	Species	Strata	Location	Notes	Images
Amenoyengi	A. mpunduensis	Upper MMF (lower assemblage)	Mid-Zambezi Basin (Zambia)	A small moradisaurine captorhinid.	
Pareiasuchus	P. nasicornis	Upper MMF (both assemblages)	Luangwa Basin (Zambia)	A large pareiasaur.	
"Protocaptorhinus"	"P." sp.	Upper MMF	Mid-Zambezi Basin (Zimbabwe)	A captorhinid similar to Saurorictus.	
Rhineceps	R. karibaensis	Upper MMF	Luangwa Basin (Zambia)	A medium-sized rhinesuchid temnospondyl.	

=== Fish ===
Fish of the Madumabisa Mudstone Formation
Genus / Taxon	Species	Strata	Location	Notes	Images
Actinopterygii	indet.	Lower–Upper MMF	Luangwa Basin, mid-Zambezi Basin (Zambia)	Ray-finned fish material, including scales and skull fragments from a large (~30 cm) Bethesdaichthys-like fish. Other scales are more consistent with fish similar to Kompasia, Namaichthys, or coelacanths.	
cf. Atherstonia			Luano Basin (Zambia)	A ray-finned fish.	
Elasmobranchii	incertae sedis	Upper MMF	Luangwa Basin (Zambia)	Fin spines from shark-like fish, including possible xenacanthids, hybodonts, ctenacanths, and synechodontiforms.	
Ischnolepis	I. bancrofti		Luano Basin (Zambia)	A common redfieldiiform.	
Pygopterus?			Luano Basin (Zambia)	A ray-finned fish.	

=== Plants ===
Several species of Glossopteris have been found in the Madumabisa Mudstone Formation, along with other "seed ferns" (Gangamopteris, Noeggerathiopsis) and true ferns (Neomariopteris. Phyllotheca). Petrified wood is also known from the formation, including large trunks of "Dadoxylon" (Agathoxylon), up to 4 feet in diameter. Palynomorphs (spore and pollen forms) are similar to those found in the Lower Sakamena Formation of Madagascar.
