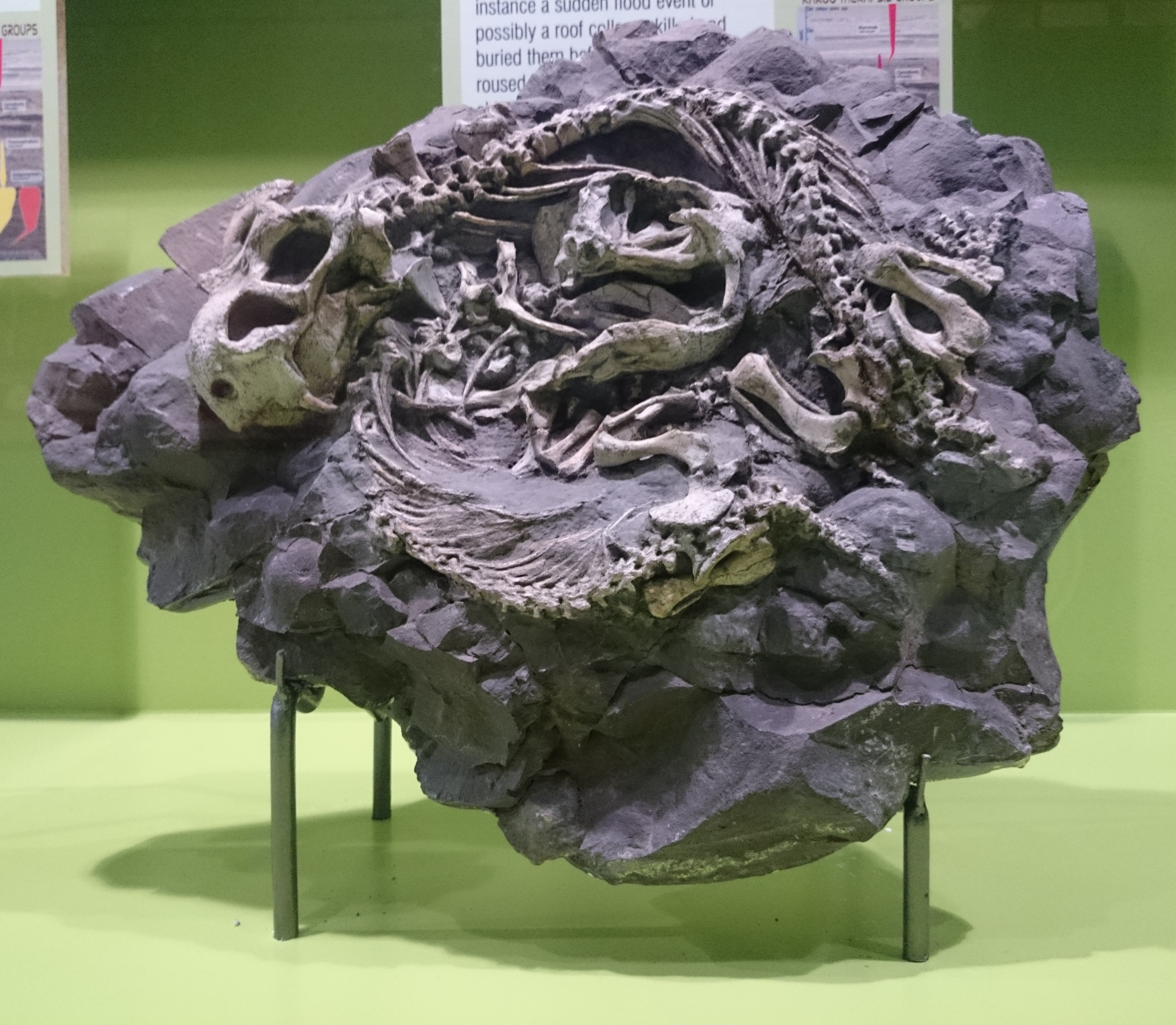
- Articulated and near complete skeletons of two adult males with distorted skulls (SAM-PK-K5477a and b)
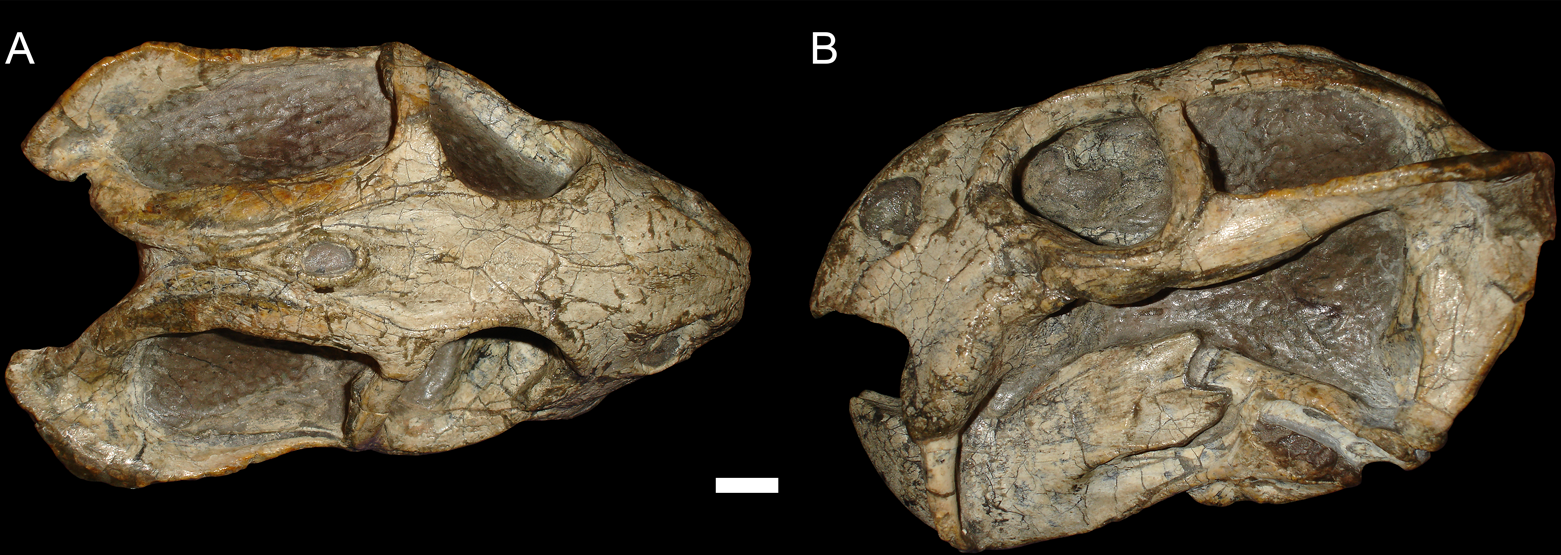
- Undistorted skull of Diictodon (USNM 22949) in top view (left) and side view (right) scale bar = 1 cm

Scientific classification
- Kingdom: Animalia
- Phylum: Chordata
- Clade: Synapsida
- Clade: Therapsida
- Clade: †Anomodontia
- Clade: †Dicynodontia
- Family: †Pylaecephalidae
- Genus: †Diictodon; Broom, 1913

Type species
- †Diictodon galeops Broom, 1913 [Junior synonym of D. feliceps]

Valid species
- †D. feliceps (Owen, 1876)

Synonyms
- Genus synonymy: ?Emydorhynchus Broom, 1913; Pylaecephalus van Hoepen, 1934; Species synonymy of D. feliceps: Dicynodon feliceps Owen, 1876; Rhachicephalodon feliceps (Owen, 1876) Seeley, 1898; Dicynodon [Sintocephalus; Diictodon] jouberti Broom, 1905 [Van Hoepen, 1934; Cluver and Hotton, 1981]; Dicynodon [Diictodon] psittacops Broom, 1912 [Cluver and Hotton, 1981]; Dicynodon [Diictodon] ictidops Broom, 1913 [Cluver and Hotton, 1981]; Diictodon galeops Broom, 1913; ?Emydorhynchus [Diictodon] palustris Broom, 1913 [Cluver and Hotton, 1981]; Dicynodon [Diictodon] testudirostris Broom and Haughton, 1913 [Cluver and Hotton, 1977]; Dicynodon [Diictodon] sollasi Broom, 1921 [Cluver and Hotton, 1977]; Dicynodon [Diictodon] macrorhynchus Broom, 1921 [Cluver and Hotton, 1981]; Dicynodon [Diictodon] haughtonianus von Huene, 1931 [Cluver and Hotton, 1981]; Dicynodon [Diictodon] rubidgei Broom, 1932 [Cluver and Hotton, 1981]; Dicynodon [Diictodon] grimbeeki Broom, 1935 [Cluver and Hotton, 1977]; Dicynodon [Diictodon] nanus Broom, 1936 [Cluver and Hotton, 1981]; Dicynodon [Oudenodon; Anomodon; Diictodon] huenei Broili and Schröder, 1937 (preoccupied) [Toerien, 1953; Cluver and Hotton, 1981]; Dicynodon [Diictodon] broomi Broili and Schröder, 1937 [Cluver and Hotton, 1981]; Dicynodon [Diictodon] grossarthi Broili and Schröder, 1937 [Cluver and Hotton, 1981]; Dicynodon broilii (Broili and Schröder, 1937) Boonstra, 1948; Dicynodon [Diictodon] vanderhorsti Toerien, 1953 [Cluver and Hotton, 1981]; Dicynodon [Diictodon] antjiesfonteinensis Toerien, 1953 [Cluver and Hotton, 1981]; Diictodon sesoma Watson, 1960; Dicynodon [Diictodon] tienshanensis Sun, 1973 [Cluver and Hotton, 1977]

= Diictodon =

Diictodon Temporal range: Capitanian (Guadalupian) – Lopingian (Changhsingian), 262–252 Ma

Extinct genus of dicynodonts

Diictodon (meaning "two weasel teeth") is an extinct genus of pylaecephalid dicynodont that lived during the Late Permian period, approximately 255 million years ago. Fossils have been found in the Cistecephalus Assemblage Zone of the Madumabisa Mudstone of the Luangwa Basin in Zambia and the Tropidostoma Assemblage Zone of the Teekloof Formation, Tapinocephalus Assemblage Zone of the Abrahamskraal Formation, Dicynodon Assemblage Zone of the Balfour Formation, Cistecephalus Assemblage Zone of the Middleton or Balfour Formation of South Africa and the Guodikeng Formation of China. Roughly half of all Permian vertebrate specimens found in South Africa are those of Diictodon. This small herbivorous animal was one of the most successful synapsids in the Permian period.

== Description ==
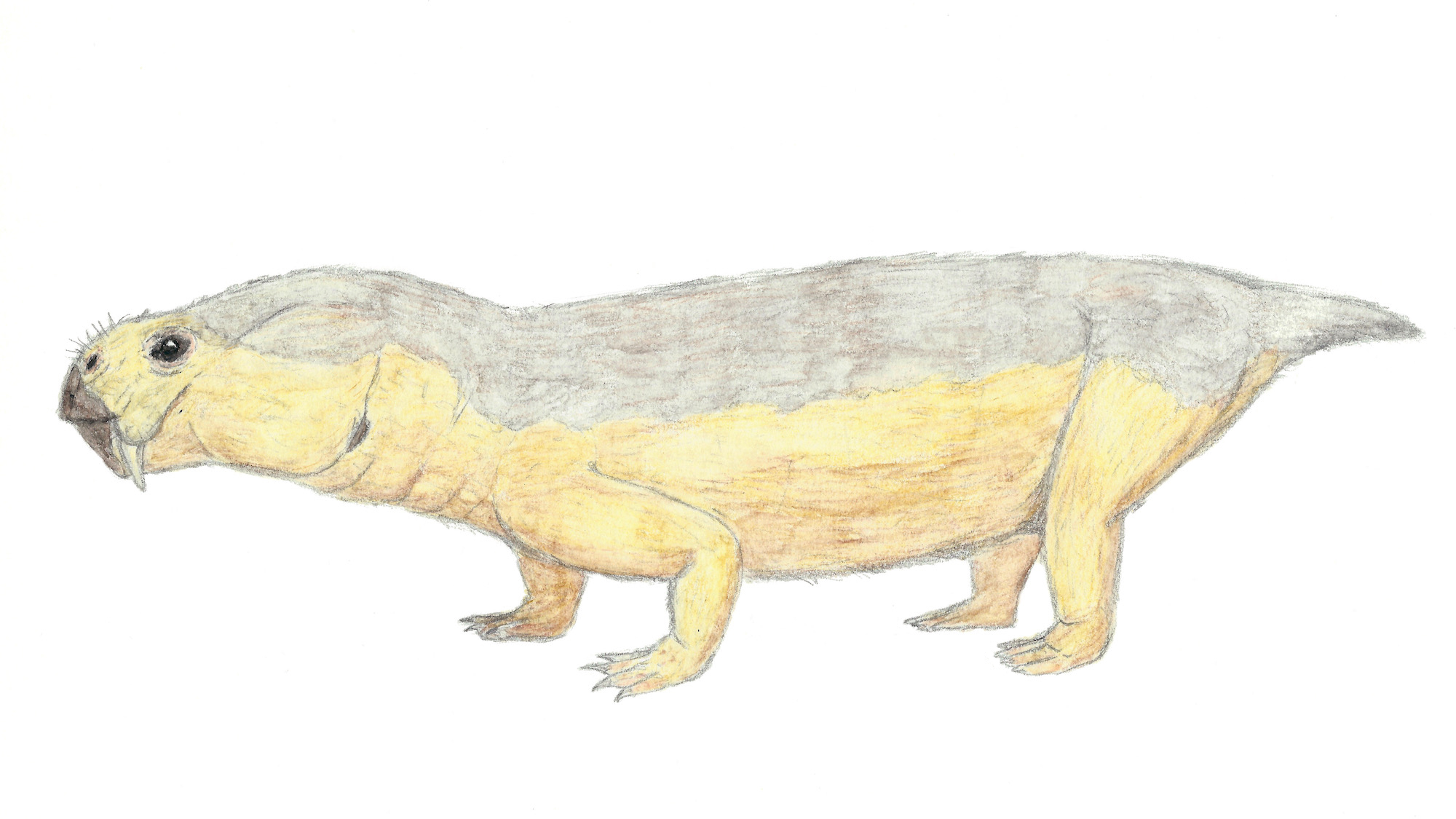
Artist's interpretation of a male Diictodon feliceps

Diictodon had disproportionally large heads that ended in a horny beak. 'There is a clear distinction between specimens having canine tusks and those lacking them, as tusked specimens are generally larger and more likely to develop a pineal boss. This probably reflects sexual dimorphism, with the tusked sex almost certainly being the male.' Diictodon had strong arms and legs, as well as 5 sharp claws on each hand, and may have had keen senses of smell and sight. Their gait was similar to the 'high walk' of crocodiles. Their jaws were also simplified, with some of the bones dedicated instead to hearing, considered a key sign of mammalian adaptation. Diictodon also had many adaptations for digging, such as highly developed muscles, a cylindrical body, and wide hands. Researchers Chinsmay and Rubridge analyzed seven other Dicynodonts species discovering the humeral bone microstructure in Diictodon showed no signs of growth marks indicating a variation in its growth strategy that further improved their ability to dig.

Size of Diictodon feliceps relative to a human

== Palaeobiology ==
=== Lifestyle ===
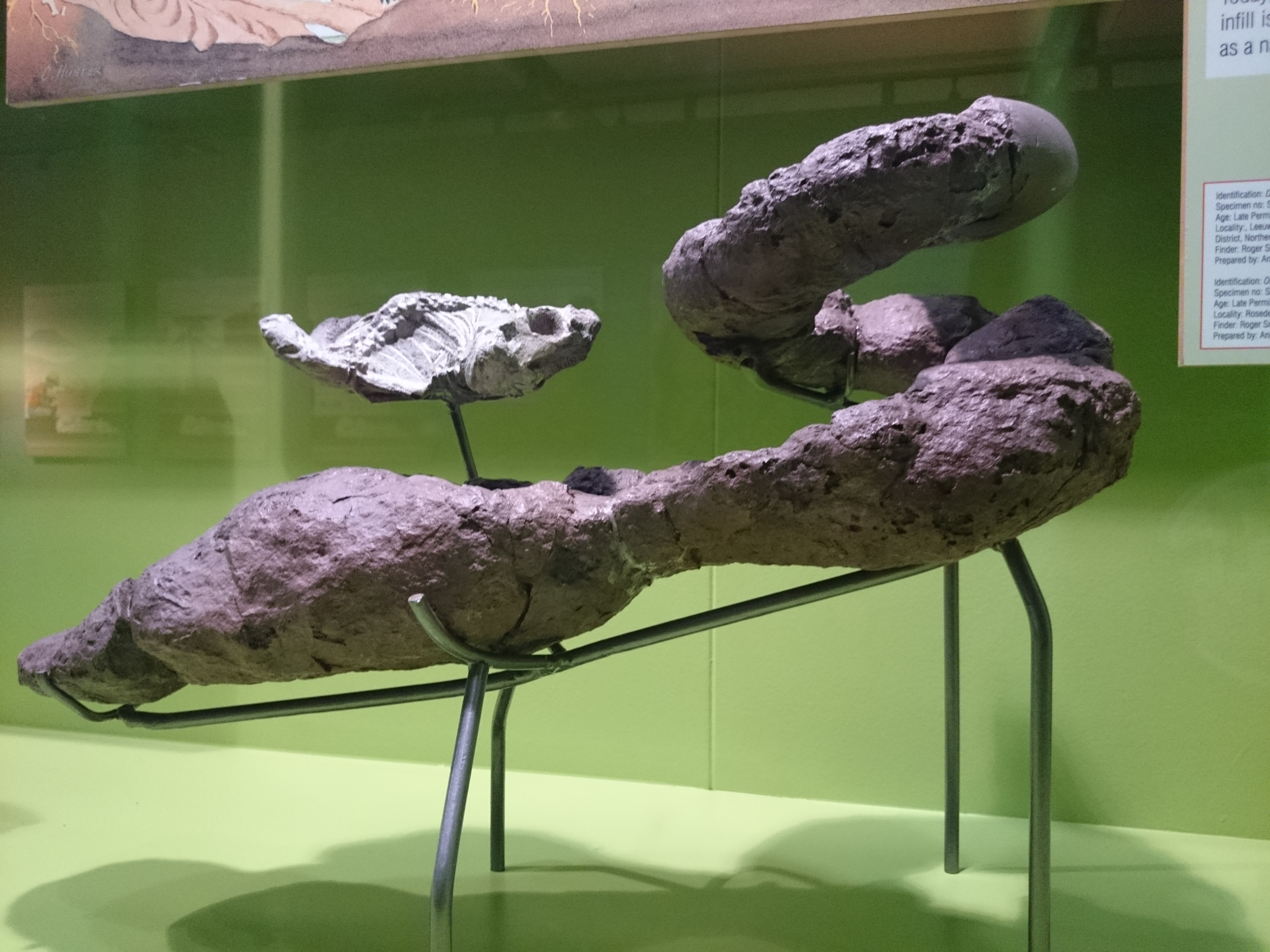
Burrow and skeleton

As a therapsid, Diictodon shared many features with modern-day mammals. Most noticeably, they made burrows into the earth, but most reached up to 0.5 m (1.6 ft) in depth, suggesting that they might have been infrequent diggers and occupied abandoned burrows. Still, many scientists believe that Diictodon lived like the modern gopher. Their burrows could have been used to escape the heat of the desert, which was the dominant environment on the continent of Pangaea in the Late Permian Period. Inside these burrows, nests have been found, where Diictodon skeletons are present. They constituted of quite a gregarious lifestyle with numerous burrows in 500 square meters of space. However, their burrows were unconnected and did not form any large colonies. Many Diictodon nested close to flood plains, and some specimens may have been killed as water flowed into the nests, drowning the animals. Diictidon's primary utilization of humeral excursion rather than forearm extension aided in employing rotation thrusting when burrowing.

Diictodon had no known rival species competing in its niche, so they may have competed primarily with others of their species for the little plant material available. Fossils of infant Diictodon discovered in brood chambers in some burrows suggest there was parental care in the genus, and that males seem to have been involved in raising the infants, based on the fact that some adults in said burrows had tusks.

=== Diet ===
Like all dicynodonts, Diictodon were herbivorous. They used their beaks to break off pieces of the sparse desert shrubs. Like modern desert animals, Diictodon may have had unusually efficient digestive systems, due to the lack of nutrients present in desert plants. As burrowing animals, they may have fed off of water-rich plant tubers.

Artist's interpretation of two male Diictodon sharing a burrow, based on SAM-PK-K5477

=== Metabolism ===
The δ^{18}O_{p} values of Diictodon suggest that it was an ectothermic animal.

=== Sexual dimorphism ===
Previously, tusked individuals were considered males, while tuskless individuals were considered females. Differences in pelvic structure may be the other evidence for sexual dimorphism.

== Classification ==
Diictodon in a cladogram modified from Angielczyk and Rubidge (2010) showing the phylogenetic relationships of Dicynodontia:

- Dicynodontia
  - Eodicynodon
  - - Colobodectes
    - - Lanthanostegus
      - - Pylaecephalidae
          - Robertia
          - Diictodon
          - Prosictodon
        - - Chelydontops
          - Endothiodon
          - - Pristerodon
            - - Emydopoidea
                - Emydops
                - - - Myosaurus
                    - Kingoriidae
                      - Dicynodontoides
                      - Kombuisia
                  - Cistecephalidae
                    - Cistecephalus
                    - - Cistecephaloides
                      - Kawingasaurus
              - Pristerodontia
                - - Interpresosaurus
                  - Elph
                  - - Rhachiocephalus
                    - - Cryptodontidae
                        - Oudenodon
                        - - Tropidostoma
                          - Australobarbarus
                      - Geikiidae
                        - Odontocyclops
                        - - Idelesaurus
                          - - Aulacephalodon
                            - - Geikia
                              - Pelanomodon
                - Dicynodontoidea
                  - Katumbia
                  - - Delectosaurus
                    - - Dicynodon
                      - - Lystrosauridae
                        - - Kannemeyeriiformes
                          - Vivaxosaurus
