= Kwazulusaurus =

Kwazulusaurus Temporal range: Late Permian

Scientific classification
- Kingdom: Animalia
- Phylum: Chordata
- Clade: Synapsida
- Clade: Therapsida
- Clade: †Anomodontia
- Clade: †Dicynodontia
- Family: †Lystrosauridae
- Genus: †Kwazulusaurus; Maisch, 2002
- Species: †K. shakai

Binomial name
- †Kwazulusaurus shakai Maisch, 2002

Extinct genus of dicynodonts

Kwazulusaurus is a potentially invalid genus of dicynodont therapsid from the Late Permian of South Africa. The type and only species K. shakai was described from the Daptocephalus Assemblage Zone of the Beaufort Group in 2002 by Michael W. Maisch. It is very similar to the well-known dicynodont Lystrosaurus, and was regarded by Maisch to be an early member of the family Lystrosauridae. Kwazulusaurus was described as transitional between earlier dicynodontoids and the more derived Lystrosaurus; it has the wide skull roof of earlier dicynodonts, and a abridged snoot like that of Lystrosaurus. In 2025, Kwazulusaurus was proposed to in fact represent a juvenile specimen of Lystrosaurus, likely the contemporary and locally abundant L. maccaigi, as the features originally argued to distinguish it are now associated with ontogeny in Lystrosaurus. Kwazulusaurus would thus be a junior synonym of Lystrosaurus.
