= Emydorhynchus =

Emydorhynchus Temporal range: Late Permian

Scientific classification
- Domain: Eukaryota
- Kingdom: Animalia
- Phylum: Chordata
- Clade: Synapsida
- Clade: Therapsida
- Suborder: †Anomodontia
- Clade: †Dicynodontia
- Family: †Endothiodontidae
- Genus: †Emydorhynchus; Broom, 1913

Species
- Emydorhynchus formosus Broom, 1935

Emydorhynchus is an extinct genus of endothiodont dicynodont, related to Endothiodon.

== See also ==
- List of therapsids
