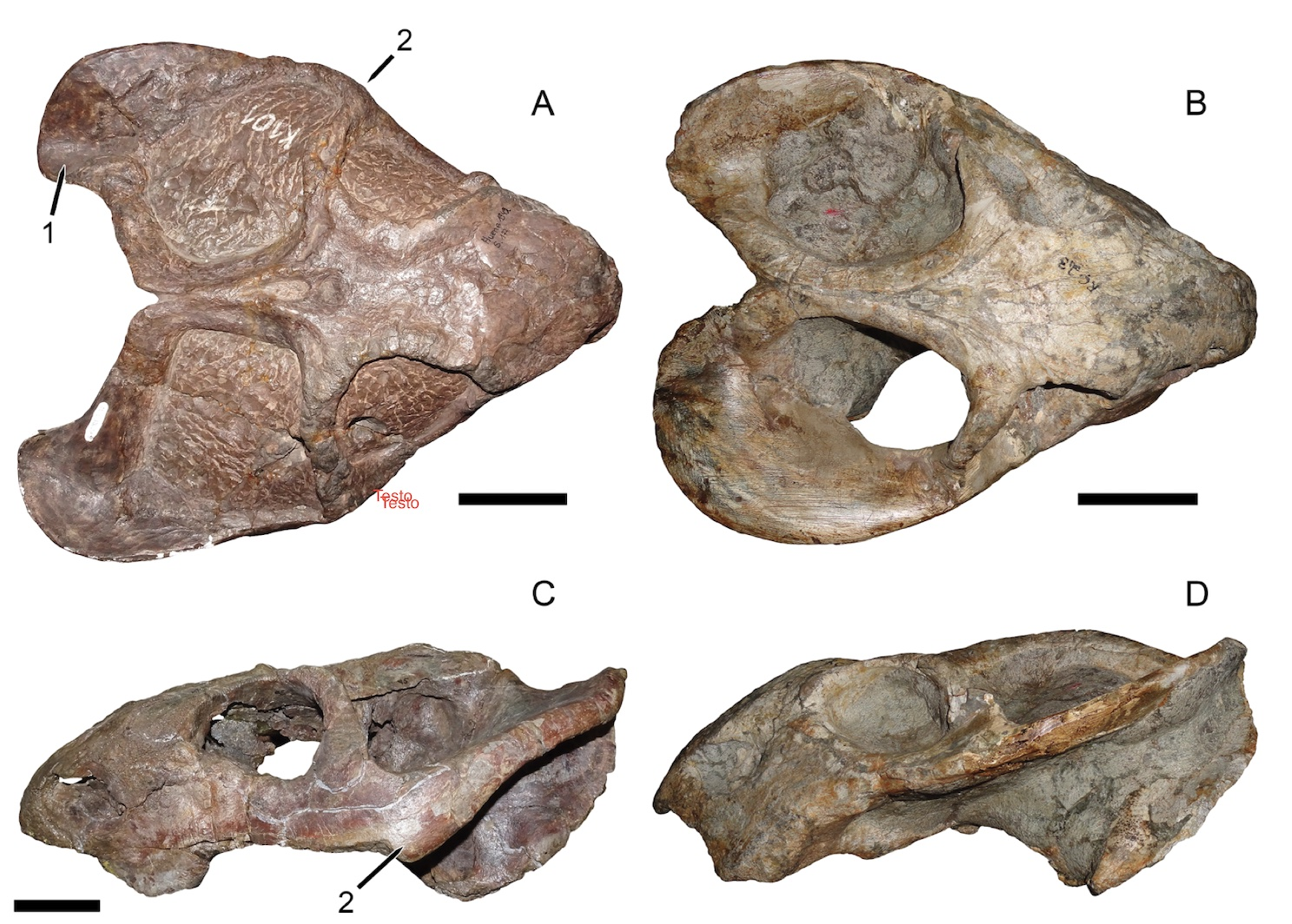
- Skulls of D. angielczyki (left) and D. lacerticeps (right)

Scientific classification
- Kingdom: Animalia
- Phylum: Chordata
- Clade: Synapsida
- Clade: Therapsida
- Clade: †Anomodontia
- Clade: †Dicynodontia
- Clade: †Bidentalia
- Infraorder: †Dicynodontoidea
- Family: †Dicynodontidae; Owen, 1859
- Genus: †Dicynodon; Owen, 1845

Type species
- Dicynodon lacerticeps Owen, 1845

Other species
- †D. angielczyki Kammerer, 2019

Synonyms
- See below

= Dicynodon =

Dicynodon Temporal range: Late Permian (Wuchiapingian-Changhsingian), ~255–252 Ma

Extinct genus of dicynodonts in the late Permian period

Dicynodon (from Ancient Greek δίς "two" and κυνόδους "canine teeth", often translated to "two canine-teeth" or "two dog-teeth") is a genus of dicynodont therapsid that lived in southern and eastern Africa during the Late Permian epoch. It is the namesake for the Dicynodontia, being the first genus named and recognised from the group by palaeontologist Richard Owen in 1845, and embodies many of their typical characteristics. It was a herbivore, with a tortoise-like beak and was almost entirely toothless, except for the pair of prominent canine tusks that gave it its name.

== History ==
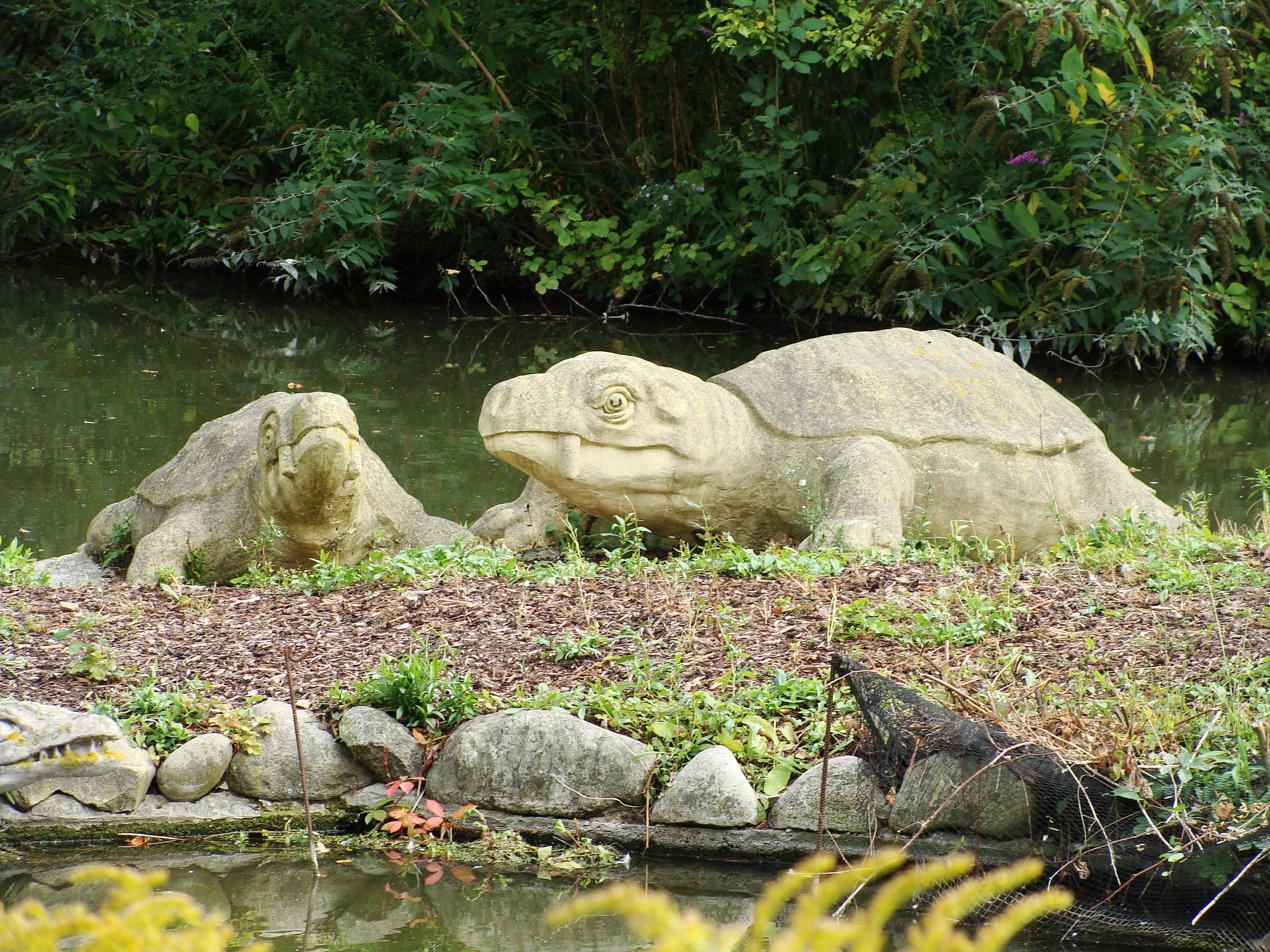
Outdated sculptures with turtle-like shells in Crystal Palace park

Over a hundred species of Dicynodon have been named and placed under Dicynodon since 1845, and the genus was for a long time treated as a wastebasket taxon. A study in 2011 revised every species referred to Dicynodon, and concluded that the only valid species were the type species D. lacerticeps and its close relative D. huenei. The remaining species were either dubious (nomina dubia), referrable to unrelated valid genera, or valid species but representing a paraphyletic grouping, or evolutionary grade, of Permian dicynodontoids (a subclade of dicynodonts that includes Dicynodon, Lystrosaurus, and other closely related Triassic dicynodonts). These species were elevated to their own genera, reviving many names previously synonymous with Dicynodon and establishing several new ones. A 2019 study named another new species of Dicynodon from Tanzania, D. angielczyki. The same study, however, simultaneously transferred D. huenei to the genus Daptocephalus, thus still leaving Dicynodon with only two species.

== Description ==
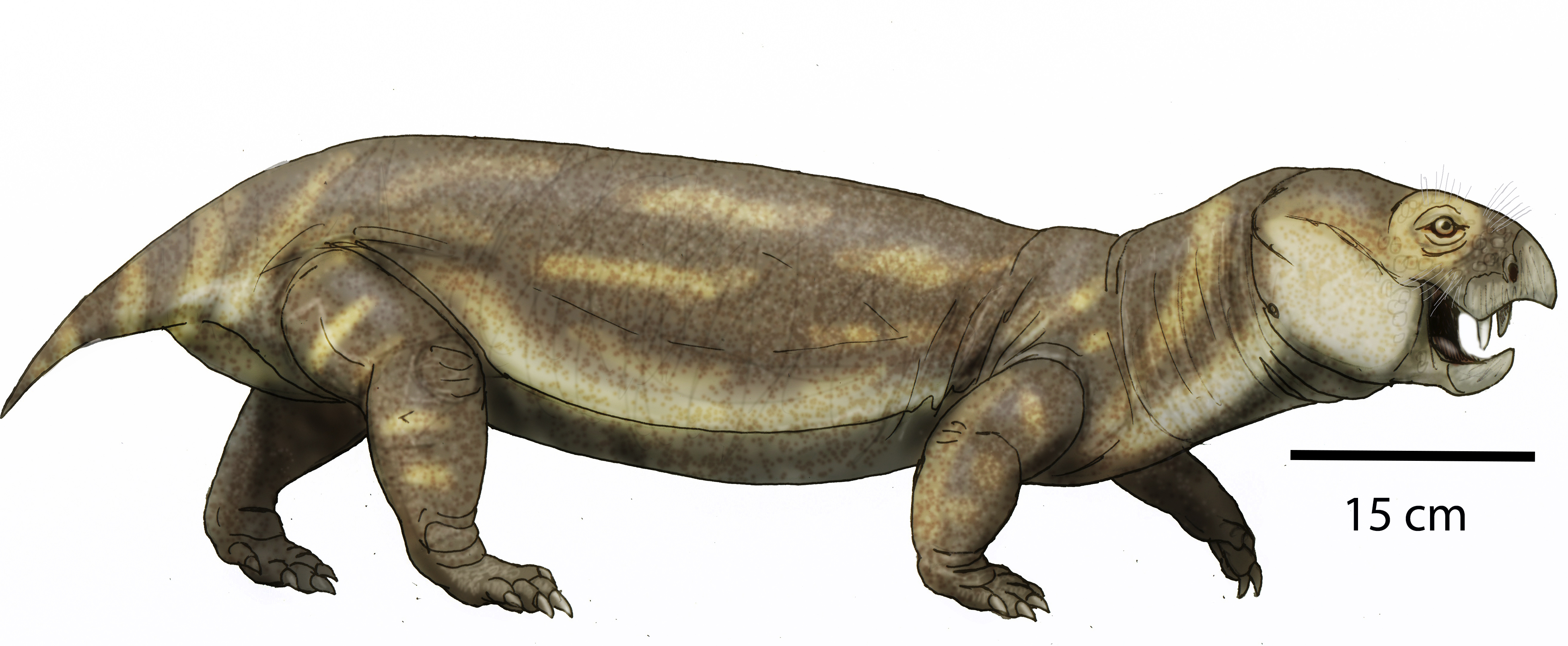
Artist's interpretation of D. lacerticeps

Dicynodon was a medium-sized and advanced member of the Dicynodont group. It had an average length of 1.2 metres (3.9 ft), although size differed among species. Its fossil remains have been found in sediments of latest Permian age in South Africa and Tanzania.

The type species is Dicynodon lacerticeps Owen, 1845. A large number of species have since been placed in this genus, some of which turned out to be synonyms of other species, others have been moved to different genera.

== Palaeobiology ==
=== Metabolism ===
Dicynodon is believed to have been an ectothermic animal based on its δ^{18}O_{p} values.

== Species ==
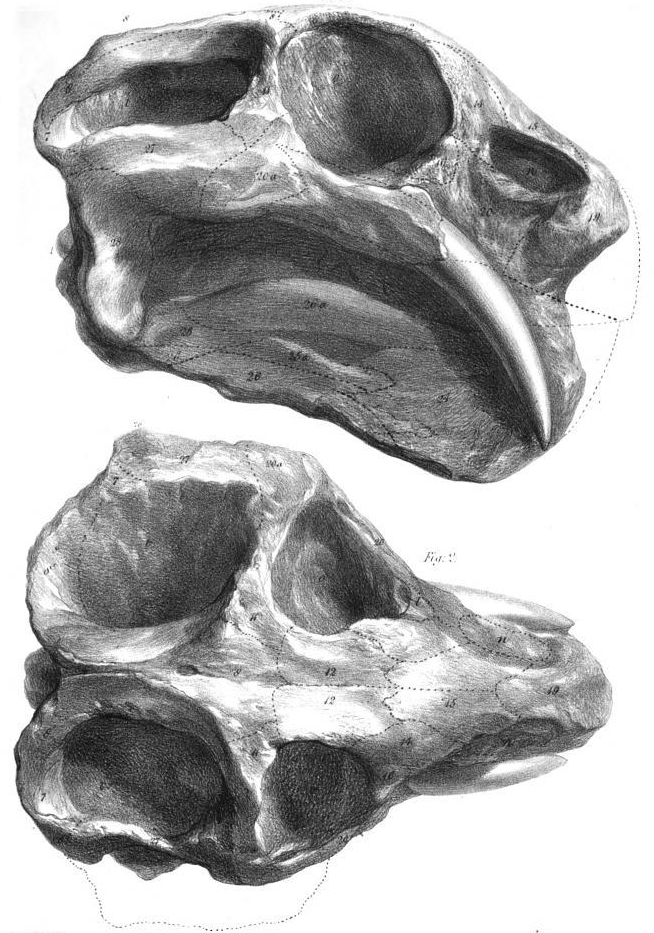
Owen's illustration of the holotype skull of Dicynodon lacerticeps (NHMUK 26233) from 1845

Two species of Dicynodon are currently recognized: the type species D. lacerticeps from South Africa and the species D. angielczyki from Tanzania. Since the genus was first named, over 160 species have been assigned to Dicynodon. A 2011 study of the genus found 11 of these species to be valid, although most are now assigned to other dicynodont genera. Below is a list of all species that have ever been assigned to Dicynodon. Since their naming, most have been considered as synonymous with other dicynodont species. Names in bold are still referable to Dicynodon.

| Species | Authority | Age | Location | Unit | Status |
|---|---|---|---|---|---|
| Dicynodon acutirostris | Broom, 1935 | Late Permian | South Africa | Tropidostoma Assemblage Zone | Junior synonym of Tropidostoma dubium |
| **Dicynodon aetorhamphus** | Broom, 1948 | Late Permian | South Africa | Cistecephalus Assemblage Zone | Junior synonym of Dicynodon lacerticeps |
| Dicynodon alfredi | (Owen, 1862) | Early Triassic | South Africa | Lystrosaurus Assemblage Zone | Junior synonym of Lystrosaurus declivis |
| Dicynodon allani | Broom, 1940 | Late Permian | South Africa | Cistecephalus Assemblage Zone | Junior synonym of Oudenodon bainii |
| Dicynodon alticeps | Broom and Haughton, 1913 | Late Permian | South Africa | Cistecephalus Assemblage Zone | Valid as Sintocephalus alticeps |
| Dicynodon amalitzkii | Sushkin, 1926 | Late Permian | Russia | Upper Vyatkian | Valid as Peramodon amalitzkii |
| Dicynodon andrewsi | Broom, 1921 | Late Permian | South Africa | Cistecephalus Assemblage Zone | Junior synonym of Oudenodon bainii |
| **Dicynodon angielczyki** | Kammerer, 2019 | Late Permian | Tanzania | Usili Formation | Valid |
| Dicynodon annae | Sushkin, 1926 | Late Permian | Russia | Upper Vyatkian | Junior synonym of Vivaxosaurus trautscholdi |
| Dicynodon anneae | Broom, 1940 | Late Permian | South Africa | Cistecephalus Assemblage Zone | Junior synonym of Dinanomodon gilli |
| Dicynodon antjiesfonteinensis | Toerien, 1953 | Middle Permian | South Africa | Tapinocephalus Assemblage Zone | Junior synonym of Diictodon feliceps |
| Dicynodon bainii | Owen, 1845 | Late Permian | South Africa | Cistecephalus Assemblage Zone | Valid as Aulacephalodon bainii |
| Dicynodon bathyrhynchus | von Huene, 1942 | Late Permian | Tanzania | Upper Usili Formation | Valid as Euptychognathus bathyrhynchus |
| Dicynodon benjamini | Broom, 1948 | Late Permian | South Africa | Dicynodon Assemblage Zone | Valid as Keyseria benjamini |
| Dicynodon bogdaensis | King, 1988 | Late Permian | China | Guodikeng Formation | Valid as Turfanodon bogdaensis |
| Dicynodon bolorhinoides | Watson, 1960 | Late Permian | South Africa | Cistecephalus Assemblage Zone | Junior synonym of Aulacephalodon bainii |
| Dicynodon bolorhinus | Broom, 1913 | Late Permian | South Africa | Cistecephalus Assemblage Zone | Junior synonym of Oudenodon bainii |
| Dicynodon brachyrhynchus | Broom, 1948 | Late Permian | South Africa | Dicynodon Assemblage Zone | Junior synonym of Oudenodon bainii |
| Dicynodon breviceps | Haughton, 1915 | Late Permian | South Africa | Cistecephalus Assemblage Zone | Junior synonym of Oudenodon bainii |
| Dicynodon brevirostris | Broom, 1913 | Late Permian | South Africa | Cistecephalus Assemblage Zone or Dicynodon Assemblage Zone | Junior synonym of Oudenodon bainii |
| Dicynodon broomi | Broili and Schröder, 1937 | Middle Permian | South Africa | Tapinocephalus Assemblage Zone | Junior synonym of Diictodon feliceps |
| Dicynodon broilii | Boonstra, 1948 | Middle Permian | South Africa | Tapinocephalus Assemblage Zone | Junior synonym of Diictodon feliceps |
| **Dicynodon cadlei** | Broom, 1940 | Late Permian | South Africa | Dicynodon Assemblage Zone | Junior synonym of Dicynodon lacerticeps |
| Dicynodon calverleyi | Broom, 1940 | Late Permian | South Africa | Cistecephalus Assemblage Zone | Junior synonym of Basilodon woodwardi |
| Dicynodon cavifrons | Broom and Haughton, 1917 | Late Permian | South Africa | Tropidostoma Assemblage Zone | Junior synonym of Tropidostoma dubium |
| Dicynodon clarencei | Broom, 1950 | Late Permian | South Africa | Cistecephalus Assemblage Zone | Junior synonym of Dicynodontoides recurvidens |
| Dicynodon copei | Seeley, 1889 | Early Triassic | South Africa | Lystrosaurus Assemblage Zone | Junior synonym of Lystrosaurus murrayi |
| Dicynodon cordylus | Lydekker, 1889 | Late Permian | South Africa | Cistecephalus Assemblage Zone | Nomen dubium |
| Dicynodon corstorphinei | Broom and Haughton, 1917 | Late Permian | South Africa | Cistecephalus Assemblage Zone | Junior synonym of Oudenodon bainii |
| Dicynodon curtus | Broom, 1921 | Late Permian | South Africa | Cistecephalus Assemblage Zone | Junior synonym of Oudenodon bainii |
| Dicynodon curvatus | Owen, 1876 | Early Triassic | South Africa | Lystrosaurus Assemblage Zone | Valid as Lystrosaurus curvatus |
| Dicynodon cyclops | Haughton, 1917 | Late Permian | South Africa | Cistecephalus Assemblage Zone | Junior synonym of Oudenodon bainii |
| Dicynodon daptocephaloides | Toerien, 1955 | Late Permian | South Africa | Dicynodon Assemblage Zone | Junior synonym of Daptocephalus leoniceps |
| Dicynodon declivis | Owen, 1860 | Early Triassic | South Africa | Lystrosaurus Assemblage Zone | Valid as Lystrosaurus declivis |
| Dicynodon depressus | (Owen, 1876) | Early Triassic | South Africa | Lystrosaurus Assemblage Zone | Junior synonym of Lystrosaurus declivis |
| Dicynodon dubius | Owen, 1876 | Late Permian | South Africa | Tropidostoma Assemblage Zone | Valid as Tropidostoma dubium |
| Dicynodon duffianus | von Huene, 1940 | Late Permian | Scotland | Cutties Hillock Sandstone Formation | Junior synonym of Gordonia traquairi |
| Dicynodon dunnii | Seeley, 1889 | Late Permian | South Africa | Tropidostoma Assemblage Zone | Junior synonym of Tropidostoma dubium |
| **Dicynodon dutoiti** | Broom and Schepers, 1937 | Late Permian | South Africa | Dicynodon Assemblage Zone | Junior synonym of Dicynodon lacerticeps |
| Dicynodon duvenhagei | Broom, 1948 | Late Permian | South Africa | Dicynodon Assemblage Zone | Junior synonym of Dicynodontoides recurvidens |
| Dicynodon euryceps | Boonstra, 1938 | Late Permian | Zambia | Upper Madumabisa Mudstone | Junior synonym of Oudenodon bainii |
| Dicynodon feliceps | Owen, 1876 | Late Permian | South Africa | Cistecephalus Assemblage Zone or Dicynodon Assemblage Zone | Valid as Diictodon feliceps |
| Dicynodon galecephalus | Broom and Robinson, 1948 | Late Permian | South Africa | Cistecephalus Assemblage Zone | Junior synonym of Dinanomodon gilli |
| Dicynodon gamkaensis | Broom, 1937 | Middle Permian | South Africa | Tapinocephalus Assemblage Zone | Junior synonym of Diictodon feliceps |
| Dicynodon gilli | Broom, 1932 | Late Permian | South Africa | Cistecephalus Assemblage Zone | Valid as Dinanomodon gilli |
| Dicynodon glaucops | Broom, 1948 | Late Permian | South Africa | Cistecephalus Assemblage Zone | Junior synonym of Oudenodon bainii |
| Dicynodon graaffi | Broom, 1940 | Late Permian | South Africa | Cistecephalus Assemblage Zone | Junior synonym of Oudenodon bainii |
| Dicynodon gracilis | Broom, 1913 | Late Permian | South Africa | Tropidostoma Assemblage Zone | Junior synonym of Dicynodontoides recurvidens |
| Dicynodon grahami | Broom, 1940 | Late Permian | South Africa | Dicynodon Assemblage Zone | Nomen dubium |
| Dicynodon grandis | Haughton, 1917 | Late Permian | South Africa | Cistecephalus Assemblage Zone | Incertae sedis |
| Dicynodon greyii | Broom, 1913 | Late Permian | South Africa | Dicynodon Assemblage Zone | Junior synonym of Oudenodon bainii |
| Dicynodon grimbeeki | Broom, 1935 | Late Permian | South Africa | Tropidostoma Assemblage Zone | Junior synonym of Diictodon feliceps |
| Dicynodon grossarthi | Broili and Schröder, 1937 | Late Permian | South Africa | Tropidostoma Assemblage Zone | Junior synonym of Diictodon feliceps |
| Dicynodon halli | Watson, 1914 | Late Permian | South Africa | Cistecephalus Assemblage Zone | Junior synonym of Oudenodon bainii |
| Dicynodon hartzenbergi | Broom, 1940 | Late Permian | South Africa | Cistecephalus Assemblage Zone | Incertae sedis |
| Dicynodon haughtonianus | von Huene, 1931 | Middle Permian | South Africa | Tapinocephalus Assemblage Zone | Junior synonym of Diictodon feliceps |
| Dicynodon helenae | Boonstra, 1938 | Late Permian | Zambia | Upper Madumabisa Mudstone | Junior synonym of Oudenodon bainii |
| Dicynodon howardi | Broom, 1948 | Late Permian | South Africa | Cistecephalus Assemblage Zone | Junior synonym of Dicynodontoides recurvidens |
| Dicynodon huenei | Haughton, 1932 | Late Permian | Tanzania | Upper Usili Formation | Valid as Daptocephalus huenei |
| Dicynodon huxleyanus | von Huene, 1940 | Late Permian | United Kingdom | Cutties Hillock Sandstone Formation | Junior synonym of Gordonia traquairi |
| Dicynodon ictidops | Broom, 1913 | Late Permian | South Africa | Tropidostoma Assemblage Zone | Junior synonym of Diictodon feliceps |
| Dicynodon ictinops | Broom, 1921 | Late Permian | South Africa | Cistecephalus Assemblage Zone | Junior synonym of Emydops arctatus |
| Dicynodon incisivum | Repelin, 1923 | Late Permian | Laos | "Purple beds" | Nomen dubium |
| Dicynodon ingens | Broom, 1907 | Late Permian | South Africa | Dicynodon Assemblage Zone | Junior synonym of Daptocephalus leoniceps |
| Dicynodon jouberti | Broom, 1905 | Middle Permian | South Africa | Tapinocephalus Assemblage Zone or Pristerognathus Assemblage Zone | Junior synonym of Diictodon feliceps |
| Dicynodon juddianus | von Huene, 1940 | Late Permian | United Kingdom | Cutties Hillock Sandstone Formation | Junior synonym of Gordonia traquairi |
| **Dicynodon kitchingi** | Broom, 1937 | Late Permian | South Africa | Dicynodon Assemblage Zone | Junior synonym of Dicynodon lacerticeps |
| Dicynodon kolbei | Broom, 1912 | Late Permian | South Africa | Cistecephalus Assemblage Zone | Junior synonym of Oudenodon bainii |
| **Dicynodon lacerticeps** | Owen, 1845 | Late Permian | South Africa | Cistecephalus Assemblage Zone or Dicynodon Assemblage Zone | Valid |
| Dicynodon laticeps | Broom, 1912 | Late Permian | South Africa | Cistecephalus Assemblage Zone | Junior synonym of Aulacephalodon bainii |
| Dicynodon latifrons | Broom, 1899 | Middle Triassic | South Africa | Cynognathus Assemblage Zone | Junior synonym of Kannemeyeria simocephalus |
| Dicynodon latirostris | Owen, 1860 | Early Triassic | South Africa | Lystrosaurus Assemblage Zone | Junior synonym of Lystrosaurus declivis |
| Dicynodon leoniceps | Owen, 1876 | Late Permian | South Africa | Dicynodon Assemblage Zone | Valid as Daptocephalus leoniceps |
| Dicynodon leontocephalus | Broom, 1950 | Late Permian | South Africa | Dicynodon Assemblage Zone | Junior synonym of Daptocephalus leoniceps |
| Dicynodon leontops | Broom, 1913 | Late Permian | South Africa | Dicynodon Assemblage Zone | Junior synonym of Daptocephalus leoniceps |
| Dicynodon leptorhinus | Broom, 1932 | Late Permian | South Africa | Cistecephalus Assemblage Zone | Nomen dubium |
| Dicynodon leptoscelus | Broom, 1932 | Late Permian | South Africa | Cistecephalus Assemblage Zone | Nomen dubium |
| Dicynodon limbus | Lucas, 1998 | Late Permian | China | Naobaogou Formation | Valid as Daqingshanodon limbus |
| Dicynodon lissops | Broom, 1913 | Late Permian | South Africa | Dicynodon Assemblage Zone | Junior synonym of Daptocephalus leoniceps |
| Dicynodon locusticeps | von Huene, 1942 | Late Permian | Tanzania | Upper Usili Formation | Valid as Geikia locusticeps |
| Dicynodon luangwanensis | Boonstra, 1938 | Late Permian | Tanzania | Upper Usili Formation | Junior synonym of Oudenodon bainii |
| Dicynodon luckhoffi | Broom, 1937 | Late Permian | South Africa | Dicynodon Assemblage Zone | Nomen dubium |
| Dicynodon lutriceps | Broom, 1912 | Late Permian | South Africa | Cistecephalus Assemblage Zone | Junior synonym of Oudenodon bainii |
| Dicynodon maccabei | Broom, 1940 | Late Permian | South Africa | Dicynodon Assemblage Zone | Junior synonym of Oudenodon bainii |
| Dicynodon macrodon | Broom, 1940 | Late Permian | South Africa | Cistecephalus Assemblage Zone | Junior synonym of Dinanomodon gilli |
| Dicynodon macrorhynchus | Broom, 1921 | Late Permian | South Africa | Dicynodon Assemblage Zone | Junior synonym of Diictodon feliceps |
| Dicynodon magnus | Broom, 1913 | Late Permian | South Africa | Cistecephalus Assemblage Zone | Valid as Rhachiocephalus magnus |
| Dicynodon marlothi | von Huene, 1940 | Late Permian | South Africa | Cistecephalus Assemblage Zone | Junior synonym of Oudenodon bainii |
| Dicynodon megalops | Broom, 1913 | Late Permian | South Africa | Cistecephalus Assemblage Zone | Junior synonym of Oudenodon bainii |
| Dicynodon megalorhinus | Broom, 1913 | Middle Permian | South Africa | Tapinocephalus Assemblage Zone | Nomen dubium |
| Dicynodon microdon | Broom, 1936 | Late Permian | South Africa | Dicynodon Assemblage Zone | Junior synonym of Basilodon woodwardi |
| Dicynodon microrhynchus | von Huene, 1931 | Late Permian | South Africa | Tropidostoma Assemblage Zone | Junior synonym of Pristerodon mackayi |
| Dicynodon microtrema | Seeley, 1889 | Late Permian | South Africa | Tropidostoma Assemblage Zone | Junior synonym of Tropidostoma dubium |
| Dicynodon milletti | Broom, 1928 | Late Permian | South Africa | Cistecephalus Assemblage Zone | Junior synonym of Oudenodon bainii |
| Dicynodon moschops | Broom, 1913 | Late Permian | South Africa | Dicynodon Assemblage Zone | Valid as Pelanomodon moschops |
| Dicynodon moutonae | Broom, 1948 | Late Permian | South Africa | Cistecephalus Assemblage Zone | Junior synonym of Oudenodon bainii |
| Dicynodon murrayi | Huxley, 1859 | Early Triassic | South Africa | Lystrosaurus Assemblage Zone | Valid as Lystrosaurus murrayi |
| Dicynodon mustoi | Haughton, 1915 | Late Permian | South Africa | Tropidostoma Assemblage Zone | Junior synonym of Oudenodon bainii |
| Dicynodon nanus | Broom, 1936 | Late Permian | South Africa | Cistecephalus Assemblage Zone | Junior synonym of Diictodon feliceps |
| Dicynodon nesemanni | Broom, 1940 | Late Permian | South Africa | Dicynodon Assemblage Zone | Junior synonym of Oudenodon bainii |
| Dicynodon njalilus | von Huene, 1942 | Middle Triassic | South Africa | Manda Beds | Valid as Tetragonias njalilus |
| Dicynodon nowacki | von Huene, 1942 | Late Permian | Zambia | Usili Formation | Valid as Dicynodontoides nowacki |
| Dicynodon orientalis | Huxley, 1865 | Early Triassic | India | Panchet Formation | Junior synonym of Lystrosaurus murrayi |
| Dicynodon osborni | Broom, 1921 | Late Permian | South Africa | Dicynodon Assemblage Zone | Junior synonym of Daptocephalus leoniceps |
| Dicynodon oweni | Lydekker, 1889 | Late Permian | South Africa | Cistecephalus Assemblage Zone | Nomen dubium |
| Dicynodon pachyrhynchus | Broom, 1913 | Middle Triassic | South Africa | Cynognathus Assemblage Zone | Junior synonym of Kannemeyeria simocephalus |
| Dicynodon parabreviceps | Boonstra, 1938 | Late Permian | Zambia | Upper Madumabisa Mudstone | Junior synonym of Oudenodon bainii |
| **Dicynodon pardiceps** | Owen, 1876 | Late Permian | South Africa | Dicynodon Assemblage Zone | Junior synonym of Dicynodon lacerticeps |
| Dicynodon parvidens | Owen, 1876 | Late Permian | South Africa | Cistecephalus Assemblage Zone | Junior synonym of Diictodon feliceps |
| Dicynodon planus | Broom, 1913 | Late Permian | South Africa | Cistecephalus Assemblage Zone | Junior synonym of Oudenodon bainii |
| Dicynodon platyceps | Broom, 1913 | Late Permian | South Africa | Dicynodon Assemblage Zone | Junior synonym of Oudenodon bainii |
| Dicynodon platyfrons | Broom, 1932 | Late Permian | South Africa | Cistecephalus Assemblage Zone | Junior synonym of Oudenodon bainii |
| Dicynodon prognathus | Broom, 1913 | Late Permian | South Africa | Cistecephalus Assemblage Zone | Junior synonym of Oudenodon bainii |
| Dicynodon pseudojouberti | Boonstra, 1948 | Middle Permian | South Africa | Tapinocephalus Assemblage Zone | Nomen dubium |
| Dicynodon psittacops | Broom, 1912 | Late Permian | South Africa | Tropidostoma Assemblage Zone | Junior synonym of Diictodon feliceps |
| Dicynodon pygmaeus | Broom and Haughton, 1917 | Late Permian | South Africa | Tropidostoma Assemblage Zone | Junior synonym of Pristerodon mackayi |
| Dicynodon raniceps | Broom, 1913 | Late Permian | South Africa | Tropidostoma Assemblage Zone | Junior synonym of Pristerodon mackayi |
| Dicynodon rectidens | Owen, 1876 | Late Permian | South Africa | Cistecephalus Assemblage Zone or Dicynodon Assemblage Zone | Nomen dubium |
| Dicynodon recurvidens | Owen, 1876 | Late Permian | South Africa | Dicynodon Assemblage Zone | Valid as Dicynodontoides recurvidens |
| Dicynodon richardi | Broom, 1940 | Late Permian | South Africa | Cistecephalus Assemblage Zone | Junior synonym of Oudenodon bainii |
| Dicynodon roberti | Boonstra, 1938 | Late Permian | Zambia | Upper Madumabisa Mudstone | Junior synonym of Syops vanhoepeni |
| Dicynodon robertsi | Broom, 1948 | Late Permian | South Africa | Cistecephalus Assemblage Zone or Dicynodon Assemblage Zone | Junior synonym of Oudenodon bainii |
| Dicynodon robustus | Broom, 1932 | Late Permian | South Africa | Cistecephalus Assemblage Zone | Junior synonym of Oudenodon bainii |
| Dicynodon rogersi | Broom and Haughton, 1917 | Late Permian | South Africa | Tropidostoma Assemblage Zone | Junior synonym of Tropidostoma dubium |
| Dicynodon rosmarus | Cope, 1870 | Late Triassic | USA | Lockatong Formation | Nomen dubium |
| Dicynodon rossicus | Sushkin, 1926 | Late Permian | Russia | Upper Vyatkian | Junior synonym of Vivaxosaurus trautscholdi |
| Dicynodon rubidgei | Broom, 1932 | Late Permian | South Africa | Cistecephalus Assemblage Zone | Junior synonym of Diictodon feliceps |
| Dicynodon scheepersi | Broom, 1948 | Late Permian | South Africa | Cistecephalus Assemblage Zone | Junior synonym of Rhachiocephalus magnus |
| Dicynodon schroederi | Toerien, 1953 | Middle Permian | South Africa | Tapinocephalus Assemblage Zone | Junior synonym of Robertia broomiana |
| Dicynodon schwarzi | Broom, 1919 | Late Permian | South Africa | Cistecephalus Assemblage Zone | Junior synonym of Oudenodon bainii |
| Dicynodon scopulusa | Lucas, 1998 | Late Permian | China | Quanzijie Formation | Incertae sedis |
| Dicynodon seeleyi | Broili, 1908 | Early Triassic | South Africa | Lystrosaurus Assemblage Zone | Nomen dubium |
| Dicynodon sidneyi | Broom, 1940 | Late Permian | South Africa | Dicynodon Assemblage Zone | Junior synonym of Pelanomodon moschops |
| Dicynodon simocephalus | Weithofer, 1888 | Middle Triassic | South Africa | Cynognathus Assemblage Zone | Valid as Kannemeyeria simocephalus |
| Dicynodon sinkianensis | Yuan and Young, 1934 | Late Permian | China | Guodikeng Formation | Valid as Jimusaria sinkianensis |
| Dicynodon sollasi | Broom, 1921 | Late Permian | South Africa | Cistecephalus Assemblage Zone | Junior synonym of Diictodon feliceps |
| Dicynodon strigiceps | Owen, 1845 | Late Permian | South Africa | Cistecephalus Assemblage Zone or Dicynodon Assemblage Zone | Nomen dubium |
| Dicynodon strigops | Broom, 1913 | Early Triassic | South Africa | Lystrosaurus Assemblage Zone | Nomen dubium |
| Dicynodon sunanensis | Li et al., 2000 | Late Permian | China | Guodikeng Formation | Junior synonym of Turfanodon bogdaensis |
| Dicynodon swierstrai | Broom, 1940 | Late Permian | South Africa | Cistecephalus Assemblage Zone | Junior synonym of Pristerodon mackayi |
| Dicynodon taoshuyuanensis | King, 1988 | Late Permian | China | Guodikeng Formation | Junior synonym of Jimusaria sinkianensis |
| **Dicynodon taylori** | Broom, 1932 | Late Permian | South Africa | Cistecephalus Assemblage Zone | Junior synonym of Dicynodon lacerticeps |
| Dicynodon tealei | Haughton, 1932 | Late Permian | Tanzania | Usili Formation | Nomen dubium |
| Dicynodon tener | von Huene, 1935 | Middle - Late Triassic | Brazil | Santa Maria Formation | Nomen dubium |
| Dicynodon testudiceps | Owen, 1845 | Late Permian | South Africa | Cistecephalus Assemblage Zone or Dicynodon Assemblage Zone | Nomen dubium |
| Dicynodon testudirostris | Broom and Haughton, 1913 | Late Permian | South Africa | Tropidostoma Assemblage Zone | Junior synonym of Diictodon feliceps |
| Dicynodon tienshanensis | Sun, 1973 | Late Permian | China | Guodikeng Formation | Junior synonym of Diictodon feliceps |
| Dicynodon tigriceps | Owen, 1855 | Late Permian | South Africa | Cistecephalus Assemblage Zone | Junior synonym of Aulacephalodon bainii |
| Dicynodon traquairi | von Huene, 1940 | Late Permian | United Kingdom | Cutties Hillock Sandstone Formation | Junior synonym of Gordonia traquairi |
| Dicynodon trautscholdi | Amalitzky, 1922 | Late Permian | Russia | Upper Vyatkian | Valid as Vivaxosaurus trautscholdi |
| Dicynodon trigoniceps | Broom, 1913 | Late Permian | South Africa | Tropidostoma Assemblage Zone | Junior synonym of Pristerodon mackayi |
| **Dicynodon trigonocephalus** | Broom, 1940 | Late Permian | South Africa | Cistecephalus Assemblage Zone | Junior synonym of Dicynodon lacerticeps |
| Dicynodon truncatus | Broom, 1913 | Late Permian | South Africa | Cistecephalus Assemblage Zone or Dicynodon Assemblage Zone | Junior synonym of Oudenodon bainii |
| Dicynodon turpior | von Huene, 1935 | Late Triassic | Brazil | Santa Maria Formation | Nomen dubium |
| Dicynodon tylorhinus | Broom, 1913 | Late Permian | South Africa | Dicynodon Assemblage Zone | Incertae sedis |
| Dicynodon validus | Broom, 1935 | Late Permian | South Africa | Tropidostoma Assemblage Zone | Junior synonym of Tropidostoma dubium |
| Dicynodon vanderbyli | Broom, 1928 | Late Permian | South Africa | Dicynodon Assemblage Zone | Junior synonym of Oudenodon bainii |
| Dicynodon vanderhorsti | Toerien, 1953 | Middle Permian | South Africa | Tapinocephalus Assemblage Zone | Junior synonym of Diictodon feliceps |
| Dicynodon vanhoepeni | Boonstra, 1938 | Late Permian | Zambia | Upper Madumabisa Mudstone | Valid as Syops vanhoepeni |
| Dicynodon venteri | Broom, 1935 | Late Permian | South Africa | Dicynodon Assemblage Zone | Nomen dubium |
| Dicynodon venyukovi | Sushkin, 1926 | Late Permian | Russia | Upper Vyatkian | Junior synonym of Vivaxosaurus trautscholdi |
| Dicynodon verticalis | Owen, 1860 | Early Triassic | South Africa | Lystrosaurus Assemblage Zone | Junior synonym of Lystrosaurus murrayi |
| Dicynodon watsoni | Broom, 1921 | Late Permian | South Africa | Dicynodon Assemblage Zone | Junior synonym of Daptocephalus leoniceps |
| Dicynodon weatherbyi | Broom, 1941 | Late Permian | South Africa | Dicynodon Assemblage Zone | Junior synonym of Basilodon woodwardi |
| Dicynodon wellwoodensis | Broom, 1936 | Late Permian | South Africa | Cistecephalus Assemblage Zone | Junior synonym of Oudenodon bainii |
| Dicynodon whaitsi | Broom, 1913 | Late Permian | South Africa | Cistecephalus Assemblage Zone | Valid as Odontocyclops whaitsi |
| Dicynodon whitsonae | Toerien, 1954 | Late Permian | South Africa | Cistecephalus Assemblage Zone | Junior synonym of Dinanomodon gilli |
| Dicynodon wilmanae | Broom, 1928 | Late Permian | South Africa | Cistecephalus Assemblage Zone | Junior synonym of Oudenodon bainii |
| Dicynodon woodwardi | Broom, 1921 | Late Permian | South Africa | Dicynodon Assemblage Zone | Valid as Basilodon woodwardi |

== See also ==
- List of therapsids
- Dicynodont
