= Katumbia =

Scientific classification
- Domain: Eukaryota
- Kingdom: Animalia
- Phylum: Chordata
- Clade: Synapsida
- Clade: Therapsida
- Suborder: †Anomodontia
- Clade: †Dicynodontia
- Family: †Elphidae
- Genus: †Katumbia; Angielczyk, 2007
- Species: †K. parringtoni

Binomial name
- †Katumbia parringtoni (von Huene, 1942)

Synonyms
- Cryptocynodon parringtoni von Huene, 1942

Extinct genus of dicynodonts

Katumbia (named for the Katumbi Viwili locality) is a genus of dicynodont from Late Permian (Changhsingian) Kawinga Formation of the Ruhuhu Basin, Tanzania. and possibly the Upper Madumabisa Mudstone Formation of the Luangwa Basin, Zambia. The type species, K. parringtoni, was originally referred to the genus Cryptocynodon, which is now recognized as a junior synonym of Endothiodon.

A mandible of Katumbia has been recovered as stomach content of the gorgonopsid ?Sauroctonus parringtoni, indicating that the latter preyed on this dicynodont.
