= Elphidae =

Elphidae Temporal range: Late Permian

Scientific classification
- Kingdom: Animalia
- Phylum: Chordata
- Clade: Synapsida
- Clade: Therapsida
- Clade: †Anomodontia
- Clade: †Dicynodontia
- Clade: †Bidentalia
- Family: †Elphidae; Kurkin, 2010

Genera
- Katumbia; Elphinae Kurkin, 2010; Elph; Interpresosaurus

Clade of bidentalian dicynodonts

Elphidae is a clade of bidentalian dicynodonts containing Elph, Katumbia, and Interpresosaurus. It is exclusively known from the Late Permian of Russia and Tanzania. Elphidae is variously recovered as either at the base of a paraphyletic Cryptodontia, or as basal dicynodontoids.

The clade Elphinae was erected by Kurkin (2010) to pertain to a clade containing Elph and Interpresosaurus, two dicynodonts from Late Permian Russia. This clade was diagnosed by a sharply shortened preorbital skull, relatively small tusks located below the anterior orbit, and maxillae with depressions located below the naris. Elphinae is often recovered forming a clade with the Tanzanian Katumbia, to which the name Elphidae can be applied under the rules of the ICZN.
