= Emydorhinus =

Scientific classification
- Domain: Eukaryota
- Kingdom: Animalia
- Phylum: Chordata
- Class: Reptilia
- Genus: †Emydorhinus; Broom, 1935

Genus of non-mammalian synapsid

Emydorhinus is an extinct genus of non-mammalian synapsid.

== See also ==
- List of therapsids
