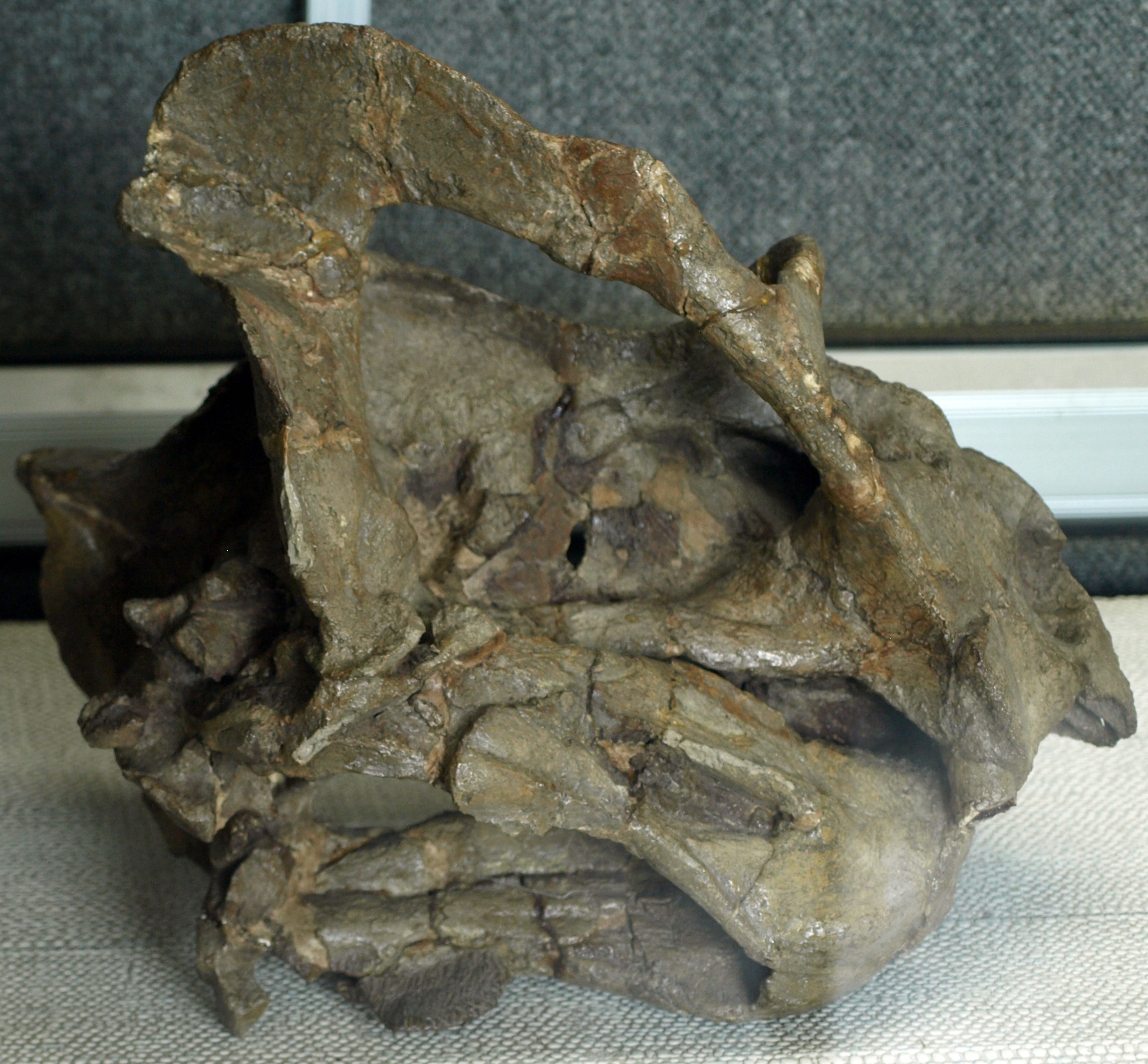
- J. sinkiangensis skull in Paleozoological Museum of China

Scientific classification
- Kingdom: Animalia
- Phylum: Chordata
- Clade: Synapsida
- Clade: Therapsida
- Clade: †Anomodontia
- Clade: †Dicynodontia
- Clade: †Bidentalia
- Infraorder: †Dicynodontoidea
- Genus: †Jimusaria; Sun, 1963

Type species
- †Dicynodon sinkianensis Yuan & Young, 1934

Species
- †J. sinkianensis (Yuan & Young, 1934); †J. monanensis Shi & Liu, 2023

Synonyms
- J. sinkianensis: †Jimusaria taoshuyuanensis Sun, 1973

= Jimusaria =

Jimusaria Temporal range: Late Permian

Extinct genus of dicynodonts

Jimusaria is an extinct genus of dicynodont therapsid from the Late Permian (Changhsingian) of China. The type species J. sinkianensis from the Guodikeng Formation (Jilicao Group) in Xinjiang, was originally named as a species of Dicynodon, the first from Asia, but was given its own genus in 1963 before being sunk back into Dicynodon in 1988. The genus was resurrected in 2011 by palaeontologist Christian Kammerer in a taxonomic revision of the genus Dicynodon. Jimusaria was a mid-sized dicynodont, and was similar in appearance to the South African Dicynodon, but differed from it in features such as its narrower snout. A second species, Jimusaria monanensis was described from the Naobaogou Formation of northern China in 2023.
