= Syops =

Syops Temporal range: Late Permian ~259–254 Ma

Scientific classification
- Kingdom: Animalia
- Phylum: Chordata
- Clade: Synapsida
- Clade: Therapsida
- Clade: †Anomodontia
- Clade: †Dicynodontia
- Clade: †Bidentalia
- Genus: †Syops; Kammerer et al. 2011

Type species
- †S. vanhoepeni (Boonstra 1938)

Extinct genus of dicynodonts

Syops is an extinct genus of dicynodont therapsid. The type species S. vanhoepeni was first named in 1938 as Dicynodon vanhoepeni. Fossils of the genus have been found in the Cistecephalus Assemblage Zone in the Usili Formation of the Ruhuhu Basin, Tanzania and the Upper Madumabisa Mudstone Formation of the Luangwa Basin, Zambia. Its phylogenetic placement is somewhat uncertain, with multiple different studies finding it as either a basal geikiid, rhachiocephalid a dicynodontoid more derived than the most basal genera but less derived than Lystrosauridae, or a lystrosaurid.
