= Mupashi =

Mupashi Temporal range: Wuchiapingian

Scientific classification
- Kingdom: Animalia
- Phylum: Chordata
- Clade: Synapsida
- Clade: Therapsida
- Clade: †Therocephalia
- Family: †Karenitidae
- Genus: †Mupashi; Huttenlocker & Sidor, 2016

Type species
- †Mupashi migrator Huttenlocker & Sidor, 2016

Extinct genus of therapsids

Mupashi is an extinct monotypic genus of therocephalians that lived during the Late Permian of what is now Zambia.. It is represented by the single species Mupashi migrator.

== Description ==
The holotype skull was recovered from the Upper Madumabisa Mudstone in the Luangwa Basin. Unlike most other therocephalians, Mupashi possessed an unusually high tooth count and a slender, elongated snout. Analysis of the scleral ring (a ring of bone found in the eye) indicates that the animal likely had a nocturnal or crepuscular lifestyle, being well-adapted to low-light environments. Its discovery is significant as it represents the first member of the family Karenitidae found in Gondwana, suggesting a wider geographic distribution for this group than previously thought.
