= Artist's impression =

Drawing of an object or a scene when no accurate representation is available

A 7 October 1957 (sic) conception of Sputnik comprises this Universal Newsreel

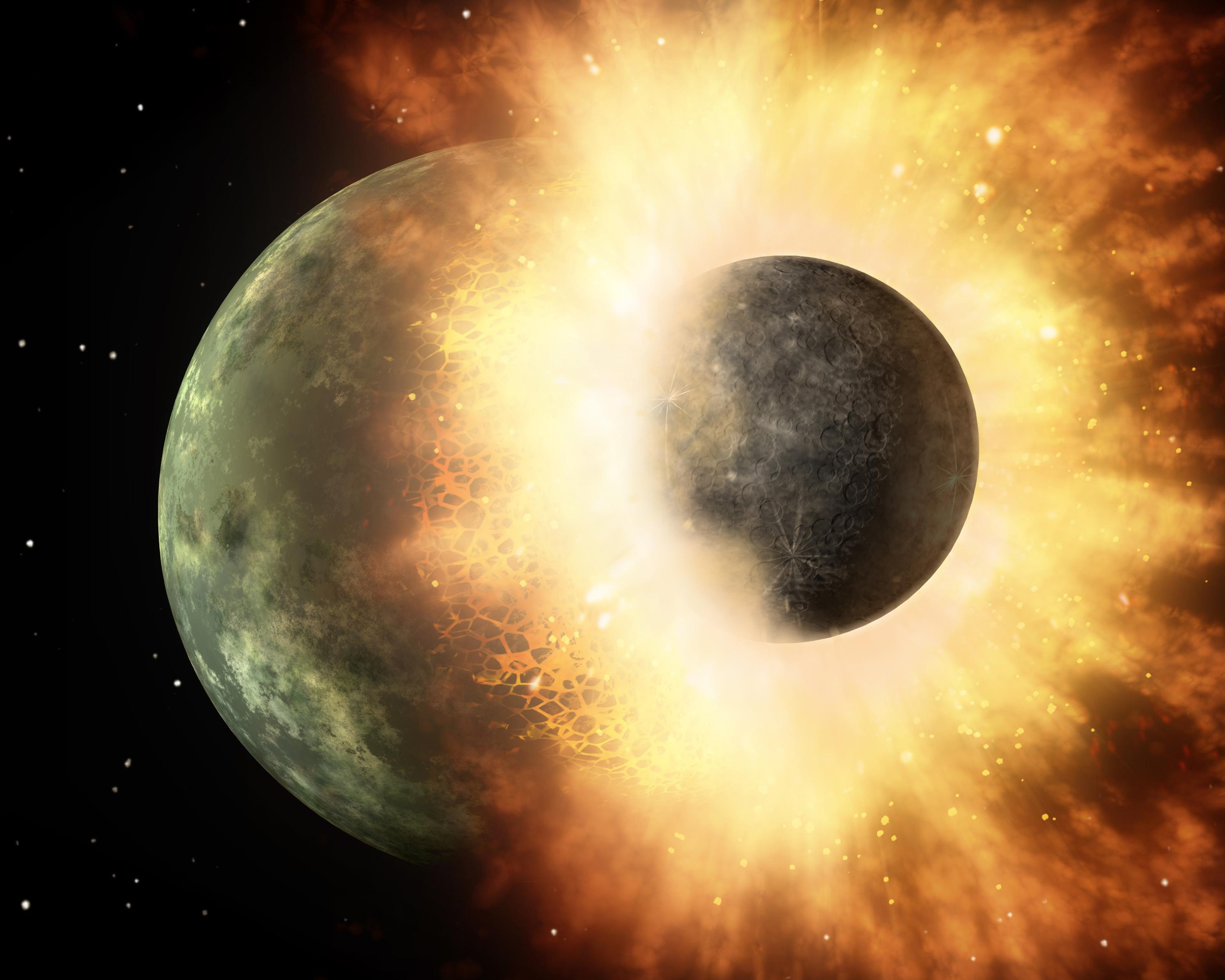
An artist's impression of a collision between two celestial bodies

An artist's impression, artist's conception, artist's interpretation, or artist's rendition is the representation of an object or a scene created by an artist when no other accurate representation is available. It could be an image, a sound, a video or a model. Artists' impressions are often created to represent concepts and objects that cannot be seen by the naked eye (e.g., very small or very distant), or fictional, or otherwise abstract. For example, in architecture, artists' impressions are used to showcase the design of planned buildings and associated landscape.

Artists' impressions are particularly prominent in space art. Artists' depictions of prehistoric life are known as paleoart.

== See also ==
- Architectural rendering
- Concept art
