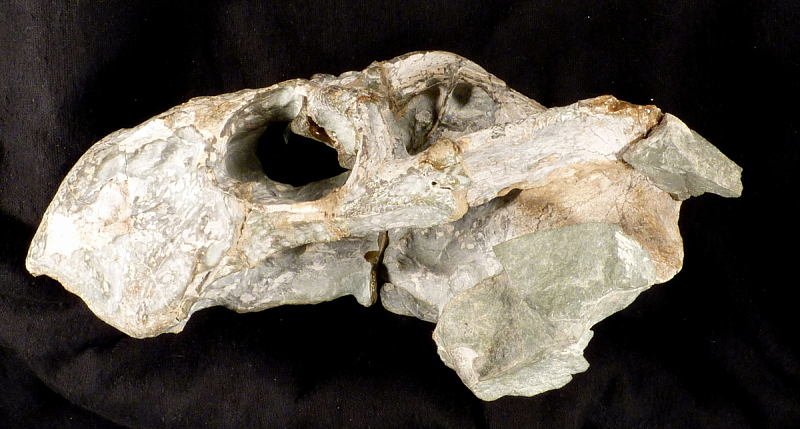
- Basilodon woodwardi

Scientific classification
- Domain: Eukaryota
- Kingdom: Animalia
- Phylum: Chordata
- Clade: Synapsida
- Clade: Therapsida
- Suborder: †Anomodontia
- Clade: †Dicynodontia
- Family: †Lystrosauridae
- Genus: †Basilodon; Kammerer et al. 2011

Type species
- †Basilodon woodwardi (Broom, 1921)

Synonyms
- Dicynodon woodwardi Broom, 1921

= Basilodon =

Basilodon Temporal range: Late Permian ~259–254 Ma

Extinct genus of dicynodonts

Basilodon is an extinct genus of dicynodont therapsid. The type species, Basilodon woodwardi was originally named in 1921 as Dicynodon woodwardi. Fossils have been found in the Cistecephalus Assemblage Zone and Dicynodon Assemblage Zone of the Balfour Formation of the Beaufort Group in South Africa.
