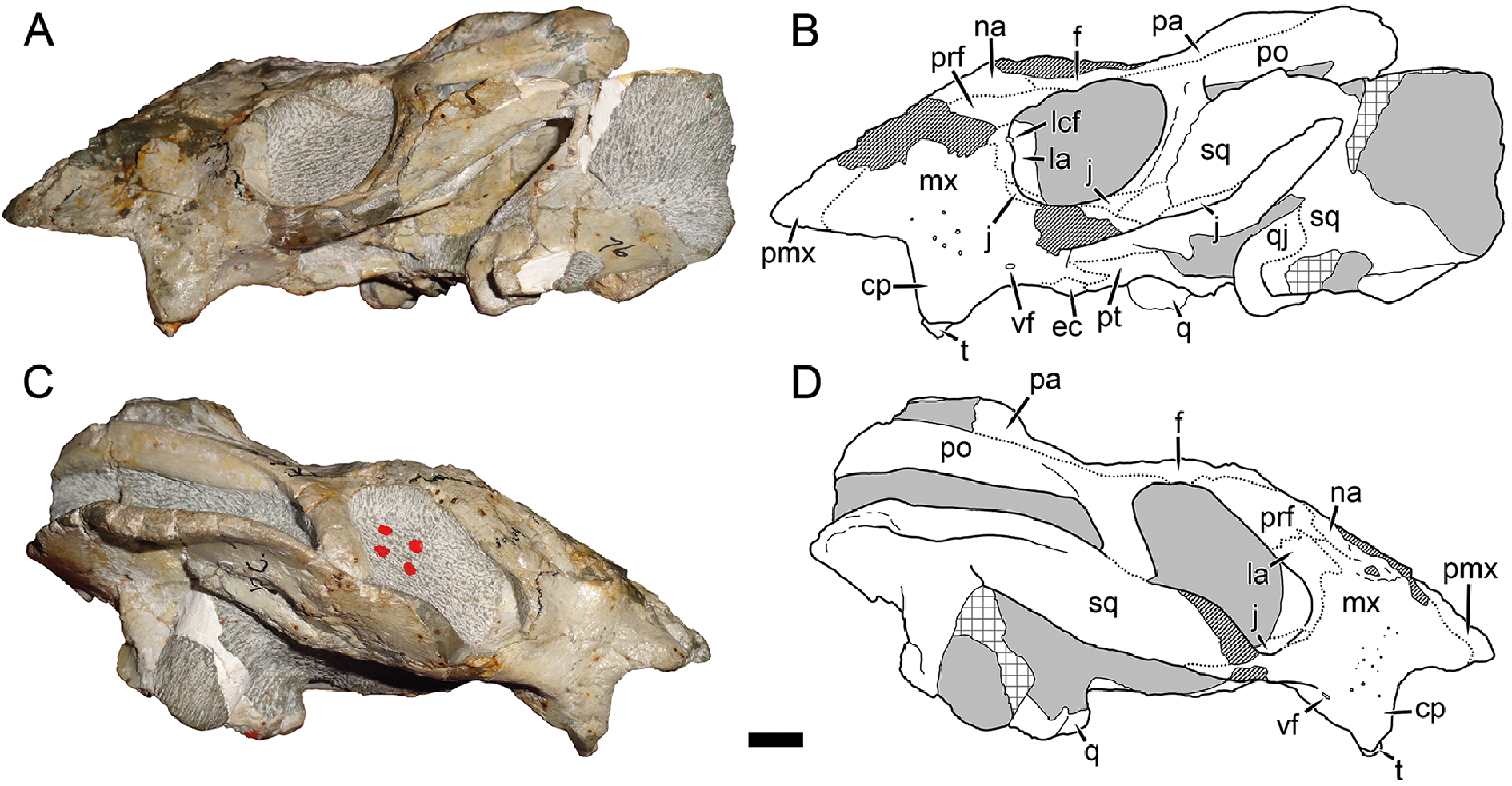
- The holotype skull of Digalodon

Scientific classification
- Kingdom: Animalia
- Phylum: Chordata
- Clade: Synapsida
- Clade: Therapsida
- Clade: †Anomodontia
- Clade: †Dicynodontia
- Genus: †Digalodon; Broom & Robinson, 1948
- Species: †D. rubidgei

Binomial name
- †Digalodon rubidgei Broom and Robinson, 1948

= Digalodon =

Digalodon Temporal range: Cistecephalus Assemblage Zone?

Extinct genus of dicynodonts

Digalodon is an extinct genus of kistecephalian dicynodont, known from the Karoo Basin of South Africa and the Upper Madumabisa Mudstone Formation of Zambia. Originally given a sparse description in 1948, for a time it was considered synonymous with other dicynodonts as a small juvenile individual of a larger genus, such as Aulacephalodon or Dicynodontoides; however it has since been recognized as a distinct species.

== See also ==
- List of therapsids
