= 1940 in paleontology =

List of years in paleontology	(table)
- … 1930; 1931; 1932; 1933; 1934; 1935; 1936; 1937; 1938; 1939; 1940; 1941; 1942; 1943; 1944; 1945; 1946; 1947; 1948; 1949; 1950 …
- In science 1937 1938 1939 1940 1941 1942 1943
- Art; Archaeology; Architecture; Literature; Music; Philosophy; Science; +...

Paleontology or palaeontology is the study of prehistoric life forms on Earth through the examination of plant and animal fossils. This includes the study of body fossils, tracks (ichnites), burrows, cast-off parts, fossilised feces (coprolites), palynomorphs and chemical residues. Because humans have encountered fossils for millennia, paleontology has a long history both before and after becoming formalized as a science. This article records significant discoveries and events related to paleontology that occurred or were published in the year 1940.

== Plants ==
=== Angiosperms ===
Name	Novelty	Status	Authors	Age	Unit	Location	Notes	Images
Eucommia eocenica	Sp nov	valid	(Berry) Brown	Middle Eocene	Claiborne Formation	USA; Tennessee	new generic placement of Simaroubites eocenica	
Eucommia montana	Sp nov	valid	Brown	Middle Eocene	Renova Formation	USA; Montana	Eucommia species, found across Western North America	Eucommia montana
Pseudolarix americana	Sp nov.	nomen nudum	Brown	Ypresian	Klondike Mountain Formation	USA; Washington	A golden larch species, split into Pseudolarix arnoldii and Pseudolarix wehrii in 1992	Pseudolarix wehrii
Tetrapteris simsoni	Sp nov	jr synonym	Brown	Middle Eocene	Clarno Formation	USA; Oregon	A walnut relative. Moved to Cruciptera simsonii in 1991	

== Arthropods ==
=== insects ===
Name	Novelty	Status	Authors	Age	Unit	Location	Notes	Images
Centrinus longipes	Sp nov	valid	Piton	Thanetian	Menat Formation	France	A weevil	Centrinus longipes
Lixus ligniticus	Sp nov	valid	Piton	Thanetian	Menat Formation	France	A weevil	Lixus ligniticus
Doryderes laticollis	Sp nov	valid	Piton	Thanetian	Menat Formation	France	A pentatomid stinkbug	Doryderes laticollis
Phaenolobus arvernus	Sp nov	valid	Piton	Thanetian	Menat Formation	France	An ichneumonid wasp	Phaenolobus arvernus

== Archosauromorphs ==
=== Crurotarsans ===
Name	Novelty	Status	Authors	Age	Unit	Location	Notes	Images
Asiatosuchus grangeri	Gen. et. sp. nov	Valid	Mook	Upper Eocene	Irdin Manha Formation	China	A crocodyloid.	

=== Dinosaurs ===
Data from George Olshevky's dinosaur genera list.

Name	Novelty	Status	Authors	Age	Unit	Location	Notes	Images
Caenagnathus		Valid	Sternberg			Canada; Alberta		Caenagnathus

== Plesiosaurs ==
=== New taxa ===
Name	Status	Authors	Location	Images
Seeleyosaurus	Valid	White	Germany	
Tremamesacleis	Jr. Synonym of Muraenosaurus.	White		

== Synapsids ==
=== Non-mammalian ===
Name	Status	Authors	Age	Location	Notes	Location
Aelurosauroides	Jr. Synonym of Aelurosaurus.					
Aelurosauropsis	Valid	Haughton and Brink				
Bienotherium	Valid	Young	193 Millions of years ago.	China		
Dicynodontoides	Valid	Broom	257 Millions of years ago.	South Africa; Tanzania; Zambia		
Leontocephalus	Jr. Synonym of Aelurognathus.					
Nanictocephalus	Valid	Broom	257 Millions of years ago	South Africa		
Prorubidgea	Jr. Synonym of Aelurognathus					
