= Njalila =

Njalila Temporal range: Late Permian

Scientific classification
- Kingdom: Animalia
- Phylum: Chordata
- Clade: Synapsida
- Clade: Therapsida
- Clade: †Gorgonopsia
- Genus: †Njalila; Gebauer & Maisch, 2026
- Species: †N. nasuta

Binomial name
- †Njalila nasuta (von Huene, 1950)

Synonyms
- Dixeya nasuta von Huene, 1950; Arctognathus? nasuta Sigogneau-Russell, 1970

Extinct genus of gorgonopsian therapsid

Njalila (named after a local tributary of the Ruhuhu River) is a genus of gorgonopsian (extinct predatory therapsids and relatives of modern mammals) that lived during the Late Permian of East Africa, known from fossils found in what is now Tanzania. The type and only species, Njalila nasuta, was originally named in 1950 as a species of the gorgonopsian genus Dixeya (now considered either a junior synonym of Aelurognathus or incertae sedis). Njalila was subsequently recognised as distinct from Dixeya and other gorgonopsians following repeated revisions of gorgonopsian taxonomy during the rest of the 20th century, but it did not receive its own genus name until 2007. However, because this name was first proposed in a PhD thesis, it remained a nomen nudum ("naked name") until its formal validation in an official publication in 2026.

With a skull reaching up to 20 centimetres (7.9 in) in length, Njalila is a medium-sized gorgonopsian characterised by a distinctive straight snout profile with an upturned and "pinched" nose. It may have been a close relative of Arctognathus, to which it was tentatively assigned to in the past, but can readily be distinguished as a distinct genus. The fossil record of the Usili Formation where it was discovered shows that Njalila was contemporaneous with many other gorgonopsians, including much larger representatives such as Inostrancevia and rubidgeines.

== Discovery and naming ==
=== As "Dixeya" nasuta ===
Njalila has a complicated taxonomic history, with the taxon being assigned to various different genera over the years. It was originally described in 1950 by the German palaeontologist Friedrich von Huene on the basis of two skulls collected from the Usili Formation (formerly known as K6 or the Kawinga Formation), exposed in the Ruhuhu Basin of southern Tanzania. The two specimens now represent the lectotype specimen GPIT-PV-117100 (originally "K 52 B") and paralectotype GPIT-PV-117095 (originally "K 96"), now catalogued in the palaeontological collection of the University of Tübingen. Von Huene regarded these specimens as representatives of a second species of Dixeya—a genus previously erected in 1927 by the South African palaeontologist Sidney H. Haughton with the type species D. quadrata—that he named D. nasuta.

In 1970, French paleontologist Denise Sigogneau-Russell re-assigned the type species of Dixeya (D. quadrata) to the genus Aelurognathus (as Ae. quadrata) in her systematic revision of gorgonopsian taxonomy, thus synonymising the two genera. However, she did not consider D. nasuta to also belong to Aelurognathus, instead tentatively referring the species to Arctognathus as Arctognathus? nasuta. Furthermore, Sigogneau-Russell only considered the holotype of D. quadrata from Malawi to belong to Aelurognathus, and she did not consider two additional specimens referred to D. quadrata by von Huene in 1950 from Tanzania (GPIT/RE/117105 (formerly GPIT/RE/7120) and GPIT/RE/117099 (formerly GPIT/RE/7121)) to belong to the same species. Instead, she suggested that they may also be referable to Ar.? nasuta—in addition to three other Tanzanian specimens (MZC 876, MZC 886, and MZC 887) referred to D. quadrata by British palaeontologist Francis Rex Parrington in 1955. Nonetheless, Sigogneau-Russell was cautious in assigning "D." nasuta to Arctognathus, and had previously acknowledged that it was not a resolved matter, especially as—in her opinion— that the roof of the skull of this species was not well preserved enough for comparison.

=== Naming Njalila ===
The genus name Njalila was first proposed for "D." nasuta in 2007 by the German palaeontologist Eva Gebauer in her unpublished PhD thesis. The name comes from the Njalila tributary of the Ruhuhu River in Tanzania. However, because the International Code of Zoological Nomenclature does not recognise theses as validly published works, Njalila was consequently regarded as a nomen nudum ("naked name", i.e. it was not available as a valid genus name). Nonetheless, Njalila was acknowledged as likely representing a distinct taxon in the following years, such as by American paleontologist Christian Kammerer in 2015, though acknowledging that it required re-evaluation and so recommended provisionally leaving its taxonomy open as "Dixeya" nasuta. In an article published in early 2026, Gebauer and her German colleague Michael Maisch formally redescribed the fossils of Njalila. In doing so, they officially established and diagnosed the genus Njalila as the valid and available name for "D." nasuta, in the new combination N. nasuta.

Gebauer also proposed the existence of a second species of Njalila in her 2007 thesis that she named "N. insigna", based on another Tanzanian skull that had previously been referred to the South African gorgonopsian Scylacops capensis (MZC 885). She distinguished "N. insigna" from N. nasuta by the presence of thicker arches between its skull openings, a posteriorly wider skull, and a slightly more rounded snout profile. The specific epithet of this proposed taxon is a Latin term meaning "remarkable" or "conspicuous", in reference to the differences noted between it and N. nasuta. However, in their 2026 publication, Gebauer and Maisch did not follow this interpretation and instead cautiously assigned the specimen to N. cf. nasuta. Gebauer and Maisch refrained from erecting a second species due to the individual variation present in the limited number of known N. nasuta specimens, and could not rule out that MZC 885 falls within the possible range of variation of a single species.

== Description ==
=== Skull ===
Njalila is known almost entirely by only its skull and jaws, which measured roughly 20 centimetres (7.9 in) in length (mid-sized for a gorgonopsian) and had a relatively short and compact snout. Its skull was relatively lightly built for a gorgonopsian with large openings for the eyes (orbits) and jaw muscles (the temporal fenestra), with correspondingly slender bony arches surrounding them. The skull is overall wider than it is tall, and the snout is relatively wider than other gorgonopsians—though compared to other short-snouted gorgonopsians (such as Arctognathus and Eriphostoma) the rear of the skull is not significantly broader than the snout. In fact, the skull of Njalila appears almost straight-sided from above and below, as the zygomatic arches of the cheeks do not flare outwards and there is little constriction of the snout behind the canines.

The snout of Njalila is very distinctive. Its profile is largely straight along the top, but the tip is characteristically turned up to a sharp point above the nostrils, which are positioned far-forwards on the snout. The snout is also distinctively 'pinched' along the bridge of the nose, largely due to the septomaxilla (a small bone found in and around the nostrils of therapsids) bulging strongly outwards under and behind the nostrils but then rapidly hollowing out behind them on either side, giving the bridge of the nose the pinched appearance. The nasal bones too, although relatively broad across the top of the snout, are likewise constricted along the middle.

The rims of the orbits above the eyes are raised above a concave roof the skull, with a characteristically elevated prefrontal bone in top front corner. The orbits themselves are proportionately large and rounded, and face laterally out to the sides. The temporal fenestra behind the orbit is also proportionately large and quadrangular. Subsequently, the bony arches surrounding and separating these openings (e.g. the suborbital arch below the eye, postorbital bar behind it, and zygomatic arch) are proportionately slender and thin, unlike the thickened and pachyostotic arches of some gorgonopsians (e.g. rubidgeines). The parietal foramen ("third eye" opening) on top of the skull is large and surrounded by a raised boss of bone. It is positioned at the very back of the skull right above the occiput, the rear face of the skull. The occiput itself is tall and roughly rectangular in shape, slightly concave and only gently sloping.

=== Jaws and teeth ===
As in other gorgonopsians, Njalila has large blade-like caniniform (i.e. "canine-like") teeth. The incisiform ("incisor-like") teeth (five in each premaxilla), however, are smaller than those of related gorgonopsians, and it only had four to five small postcanine teeth behind the caniniform. The jawline of the maxilla in the upper jaw is notably convex, with a much more exaggerated curve of the toothrow than in other gorgonopsians except for Arctognathus. This exaggerated curvature is due to the postcanine teeth being housed in a raised bony flange of the maxilla behind the canines. The maxilla also sports a distinct horizontal ridge where it adjoins the jugal bone, as well as an unusual groove over the postcanine teeth, starting shallowly above the first postcanine and running down to the edge of the bone behind the 5th postcanine, deepening along its length.

Like other gorgonopsians Njalila also possessed palatal teeth set on a pair of raised bean-shaped bosses on the roof of the mouth. Each boss spans both the palatine and the pterygoid bones, with three teeth on each palatine and two on the pterygoid. There is a shallow depression between the two bosses (the palatine fossa), but uniquely there is an extra "pre-fossa" hollowed out in front of the bosses too. There are also a few palatal teeth on the transverse processes of the pterygoid that abut against the margin of the skull, but they are not well developed. Further forward, the vomer separating the two internal nostril openings (choanae) is very broad at the front, but narrows rapidly to a constricted splint halfway down its length. This more resembles the vomer of the derived rubidgeines than the uniformly narrower vomer of earlier gorgonopsians. The vomer sports three ridges, one down its middle and two running along each edge.

The dentary bone of the lower jaw is comparatively slender, with a sloping mandibular symphysis that nonetheless bears the characteristic 'chin' of gorgonopsians. The reflected lamina of the angular bone towards the back of the jaw is only moderately ridged, in comparison to other gorgonopsians. Only one specimen preserves remains of the postcranial skeleton, mostly vertebrae and some other fragmentary bones, but these are undescribed as of 2026.

Njalila cf. nasuta broadly resembles other specimens of Njalila, including the characteristic upturned snout tip and palatal "pre-fossa", but may differ in having a more sloping snout and wider, more flared zygomatic arches and temporal fenestra than definitive N. nasuta.

== Classification ==
The phylogenetic (evolutionary) relationships of Njalila were first analysed by Gebauer in her unpublished 2007 PhD thesis—the first computerised phylogenetic analysis of gorgonopsians ever conducted. Gebauer found Njalila as a member of the family Gorgonopsidae, which in her classification excluded the most basal genera of gorgonopsians in her tree that she regarded as plesiomorphic (i.e. representing the ancestral condition) for the group. Within Gorgonopsidae, Njalila was a relatively derived member but outside of a clade that included the giant gorgonopsians Inostrancevia and rubidgeines, occupying part of an evolutionary grade between them and more ancestral gorgonopsids.

Gorgonopsian phylogeny of Gebauer (2007):

- - Aloposaurus
  - - Cyonosaurus
    - - Aelurosaurus
      - Gorgonopsidae
        - Sauroctonus
        - - Scylacognathus
          - - Eoarctops
            - Gorgonops
            - - Njalila
              - - Lycaenops
                - - Arctognathus
                  - - Inostrancevia
                    - Rubidgeinae
                      - Aelurognathus
                      - - Rubidgea
                        - - Sycosaurus
                          - Clelandina

The relationships of Gorgonopsia as recovered by the analysis of Gebauer (2007) (Note: Two genera cited in this cladogram, i.e. Scylacognathus and Eoarctops, have been synonymized with Eriphostoma since a 2015 paper.)

Gebauer's 2007 analysis was the first major attempt to perform a phylogenetic analysis of gorgonopsians, but its overall results have not been borne out by subsequent independent analyses. Namely, in 2016 Kammerer described Gebauer's analysis as "unsatisfactory", citing that many of the characters used by her analysis were based upon skull proportions that are variable within taxa, both individually and ontogenetically (i.e. traits that change through growth). As an example of a potential problem created by this, he highlighted the basal position of Aloposaurus (a wastebasket taxon of various immature gorgonopsians) compared to the stratigraphically older and morphologically basal Eoarctops (now a junior synonym of Eriphostoma) being found in a relatively more derived position.

Most subsequent analyses of gorgonopsian phylogeny have relied on a dataset originally published by Kammerer in 2016. Following an update to the dataset in a 2018 study by Kammerer and his Russian colleague Vladimir Masyutin, all subsequent iterations of the dataset find gorgonopsians to be divided into two major subgroups of African and Russian origin, with the exception of the basal genera Nochnitsa and Viatkogorgon, unlike Gebauer's tree.

When formally describing Njalila in 2026, Gebauer and Maisch incorporated it into a recent derivation of Kammerer's dataset. Including Njalila did not alter the existing arrangement of the tree, and it was found as the sister taxon of Arctognathus within the so-called "African clade". This would appear to corroborate Sigogneau-Russell's identification of Njalila as closely associated with Arctognathus curvimola, and so potentially assignable to the same genus. However, Gebauer and Maisch noted this relationship was weakly supported, and there are no apparent synapomorphies (unique shared traits) to convincingly unite the two species as each other's closest relatives together. As such, Njalila was upheld by Gebauer and Maisch as representing a taxonomically distinct genus. The results of Gebauer and Maisch's 2026 analysis are depicted in the cladogram below.

- Gorgonopsia
  - Nochnitsa
  - - Viatkogorgon
    - - "Russian clade"
        - Suchogorgon
        - - Sauroctonus
          - - Pravoslavlevia
            - Inostrancevia
      - "African clade"
        - - Eriphostoma
          - - Gorgonops
            - - Cynariops
              - - - Arctognathus
                  - Njalila
                - Lycaenops
                - Smilesaurus
                - Arctops
                - Rubidgeinae

== Paleoecology ==
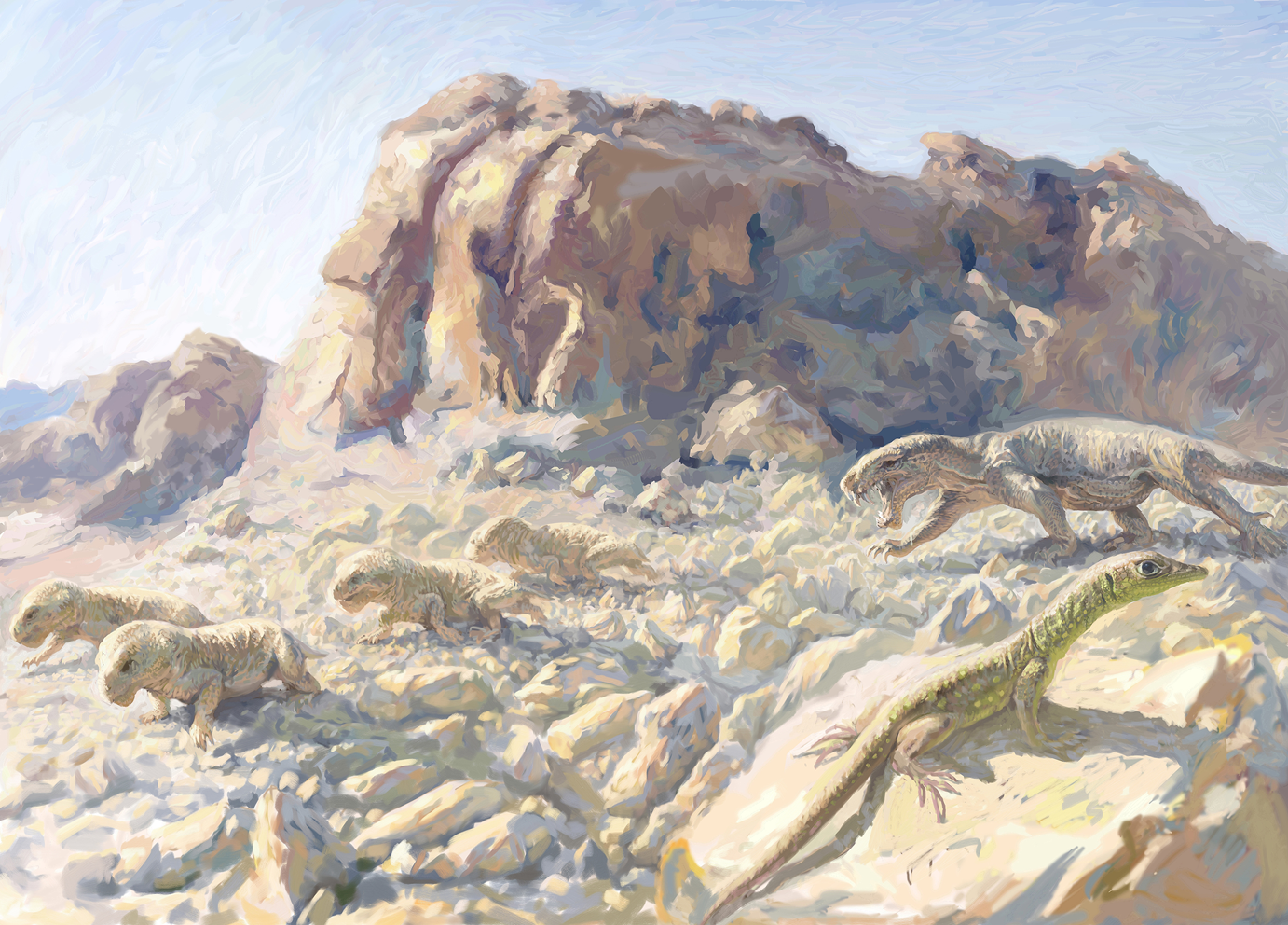
Life restoration of a gorgonopsian hunting a herd of dicynodonts, based after the Usili Formation

All known fossil specimens of Njalila have come from the Usili Formation, Ruhuhu Basin, southern Tanzania. This formation, dating from the Late Permian, is known to provide a fairly considerable number of fossils of various tetrapods. During this period, this formation would have been an alluvial plain which would have had numerous small meandering streams passing through well-vegetated floodplains. The basement of this formation would also have housed a generally high phreatic zone.

Njalila was contemporary with many other gorgonopsians. These include Cyonosaurus, Gorgonops, Inostrancevia, Lycaenops, "Scymnognathus" parringtoni, Scylacops and the rubidgeines Aelurognathus, Dinogorgon, Rubidgea, Ruhuhucerberus and Sycosaurus. (Note: Historically, much higher numbers of gorgonopsians were reported from the Usili Formation, but most of them turned out to be junior synonyms of other genera.) The other theriodonts present are represented by the therocephalians Silphictidoides and Theriognathus as well as by the cynodont Procynosuchus.

The most numerous tetrapods in the formation are the dicynodonts, among which are Compsodon, Daptocephalus, Dicynodon, Dicynodontoides, Endothiodon, Euptychognathus, Geikia, Katumbia, Kawingasaurus, Oudenodon, Pristerodon, Rhachiocephalus and an indeterminate cryptodont. An undetermined biarmosuchian similar to Burnetia is also known. Therapsids are not the only tetrapods present in the Usili Formation. Indeed, sauropsids such as the archosauromorph Aenigmastropheus and the pareiasaurs Anthodon and Pareiasaurus are known. The only temnospondyl recorded is Peltobatrachus.
