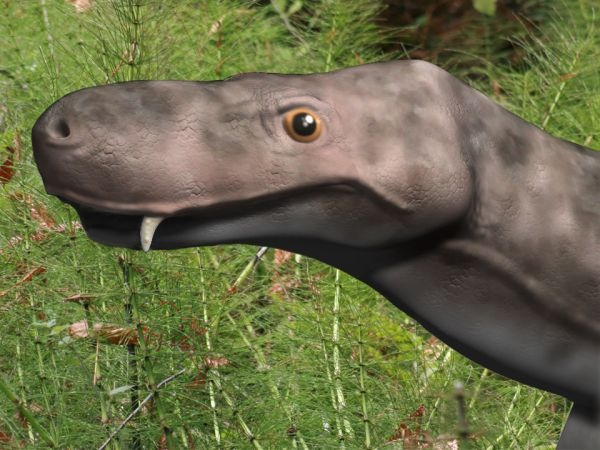
- Life restoration of Aloposaurus gracilis

Scientific classification
- Kingdom: Animalia
- Phylum: Chordata
- Clade: Synapsida
- Clade: Therapsida
- Clade: †Gorgonopsia
- Genus: †Aloposaurus; Broom, 1910

Species
- †A. gracilis Broom, 1910 (type); †A. tenuis (Brink and Kitching, 1953 [originally Aloposauroides tenuis])

Synonyms
- Aloposauroides Brink and Kitching, 1953

= Aloposaurus =

Aloposaurus Temporal range: Late Permian

Extinct genus of therapsids

Aloposaurus is an extinct genus of gorgonopsian therapsids from the Late Permian of South Africa. It was first named by Robert Broom in 1910, and contains the type species A. gracilis (holotype AMNH 5317), and possibly a second species A. tenuis. This small gorgonopsid had a slender narrow skull only 12 centimetres (4.7 in) long, with a total body length of 60–70 cm (2.0–2.3 ft).

== Classification ==
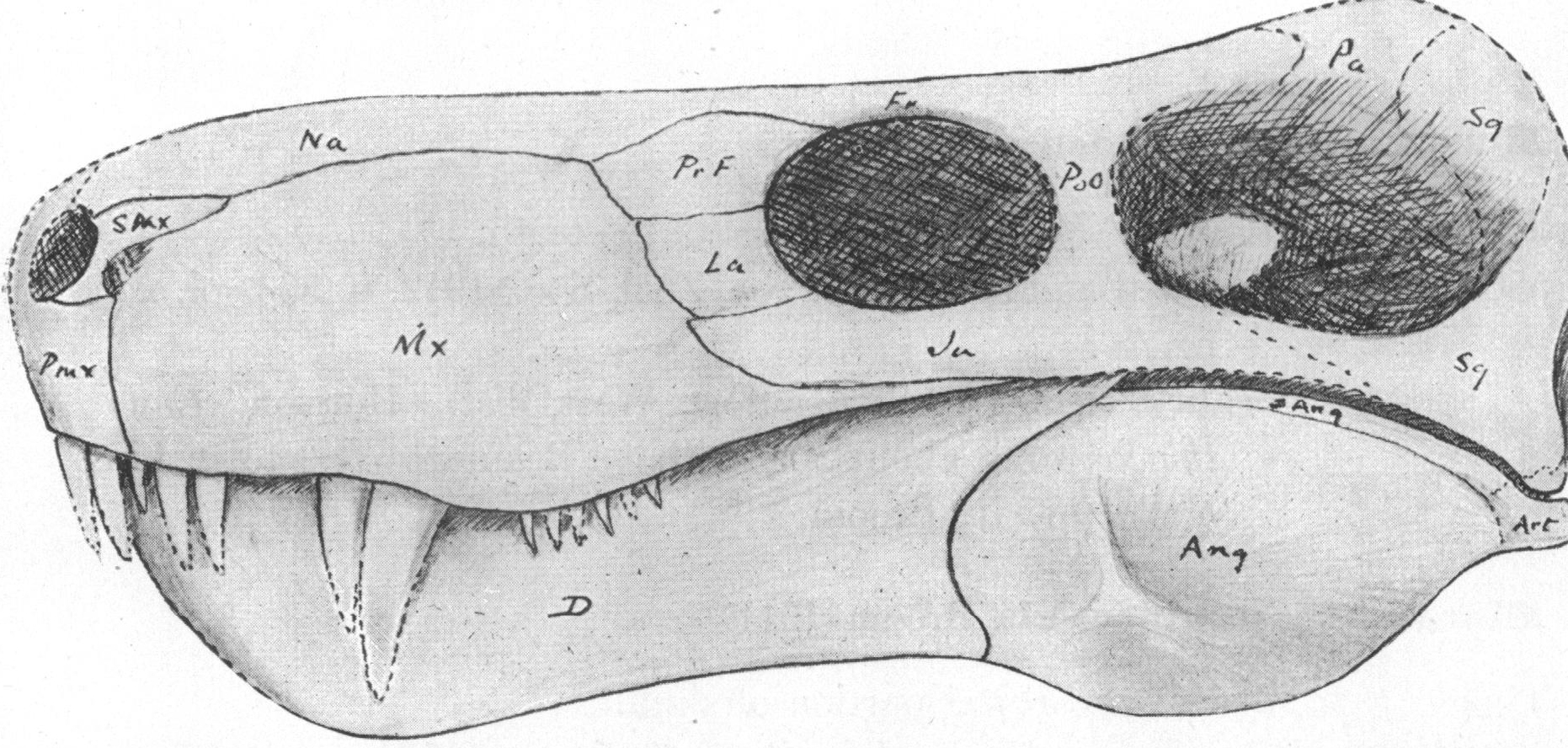
Aloposaurus gracilis skull restoration, specimen 5317

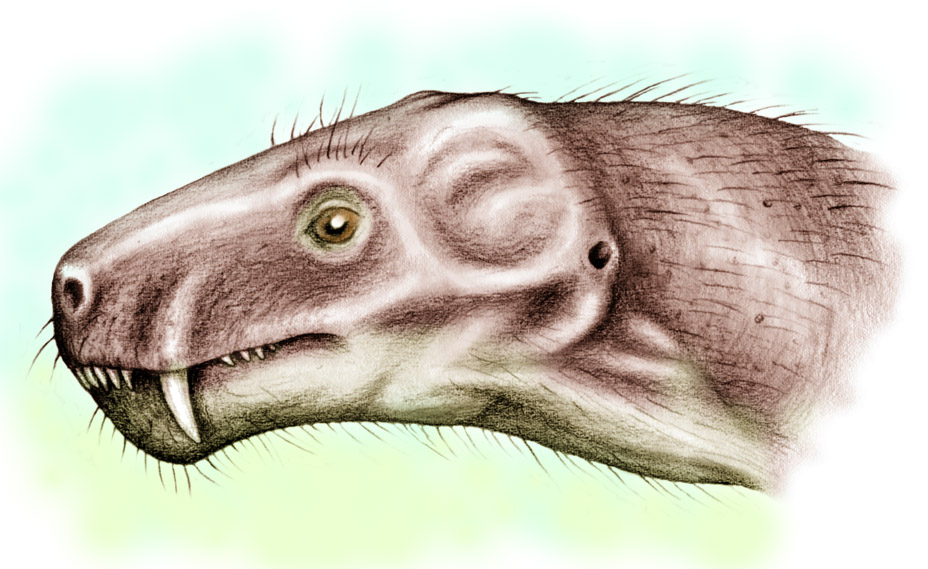
Aloposaurus

Below is a cladogram from the phylogenetic analysis of Gebauer (2007):

- Gorgonopsia
  - Aloposaurus
  - - Cyonosaurus
    - - Aelurosaurus
      - Gorgonopsidae
        - Scylacognathus
        - - Eoarctops
          - Gorgonops
          - - Njalila
            - - Lycaenops
              - - Arctognathus
                - - Inostrancevia
                  - Rubidgeinae
                    - Aelurognathus
                    - - Rubidgea
                      - - Sycosaurus
                        - Clelandina

== Sources ==
- paleodb.org
