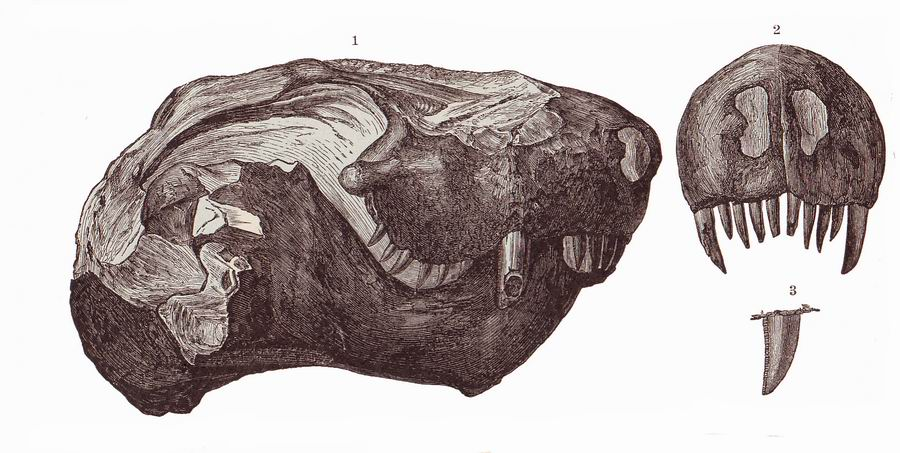
- 1886 illustration of the holotype skull of Arctognathus curvimola

Scientific classification
- Kingdom: Animalia
- Phylum: Chordata
- Clade: Synapsida
- Clade: Therapsida
- Clade: †Gorgonopsia
- Genus: †Arctognathus; Broom, 1911
- Species: †A. curvimola

Binomial name
- †Arctognathus curvimola (Owen, 1876) [originally Lycosaurus curvimola Owen, 1876 (type species)]

Synonyms
- Arctognathoides Boonstra, 1934; A. breviceps Boonstra, 1934; Lycaenodontoides Haughton, 1924; L. bathyrhinus Haughton, 1924

= Arctognathus =

Arctognathus Temporal range: Late Permian (Wuchiapingian to Changhsingian) c. 256–252 Ma

Extinct genus of therapsids

Arctognathus is an extinct genus of short-snouted gorgonopsian that lived during the Late Permian in the Karoo basin of what is now South Africa.Although several gorgonopsian species have been assigned to the genus historically, only the type species A. curvimola is now recognised.

== Discovery and naming ==
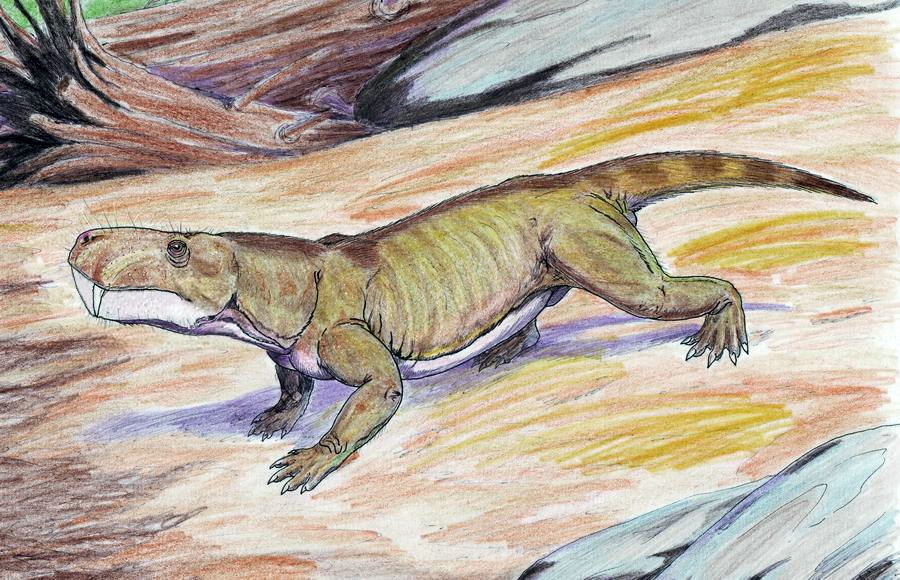
Artist's interpretation of A. curvimola in life

=== Type and synonyms ===
Arctognathus curvimola was among the first named gorgonopsians when anatomist Richard Owen described the first gorgonopsians in an 1876 paper. Owen coined three gorgonopsian genera; Gorgonops, Cynodraco, and Lycosaurus, and named L. curvimola (i.e. Arctognathus) as one of three nominal species of Lycosaurus. Owen never assigned a type species for Lycosaurus, and in 1894 Harry Seeley proposed appointing it L. curvimola, but was pre-empted by Richard Lydekker in 1890 who designated it L. pardalis. As such, when L. curvimola was recognised as generically distinct from L. pardalis by Robert Broom he named L. curvimola as the type species of the new genus Arctognathus in 1911 as the new combination A. curvimola.

Several species have been assigned to Arctognathus since then. Lycaenodontoides bathyrhinus ("Lycaenodon-like") was named by Sidney Haughton in 1924 and subsequently recognised as a close relative of Arctognathus until it was formally synonymised with A. curvimola by Denise Sigogneau-Russell in 1970. The genus Arctognathoides was named by Lieuwe Dirk Boonstra in 1934 and likewise was synonymised with Arctognathus by Sigogneau-Russell in 1970, but unlike L. bathyrhinus she retained the taxon as a valid species, Arctognathus breviceps, a position upheld by Eva Gebauer in her 2007 PhD thesis. A revision of Arctognathus in 2014 by Christian Kammerer recognised only the type species A. curvimola as valid, regarding both L. bathyrhinus and A. breviceps as junior synonyms of A. curvimola.

=== Misassigned species ===
A number of other species have also been historically assigned to Arctognathus, but either likely belong to or have already been assigned to other genera. For example, the Russian genus Sauroctonus was also originally described as a species of Arctognathus, A. progressus, by Alexandra Paulinovna Hartmann-Weinberg in 1938. In 1970, Sigogneau-Russell tentatively assigned the Tanzanian taxon Dixeya nastua (named in 1950 by Friedrich von Huene) to Arctognathus as the species A.? nasuta. This species was recognised as belonging to a distinct genus by Gebauer in 2007 who proposed the new genus Njalila, although as it was named in a thesis this name remained a nomen nudum (naked name) according to the International Code of Zoological Nomenclature until it was formally published in 2026.

Another species, originally named Cyniscops cookei by Broom in 1948 and based on a small specimen, was also tentatively assigned to Arctognathus as A.? cookei by Signogneau-Russell in 1970. In 2014, Kammerer regarded this specimen as most similar to Aloposaurus or the juvenile of another gorgonopsian. Signogneau-Russell and Gebauer both also tentatively synonymised Lycaenops pricei with A. curvimola, but this species was recognised by Kammerer in 2014 as being consistent with Lycaenops rather than Arctognathus, pending a revision of the former genus.

The status of another nominal species of Arctognathus named by Haughton in 1924, Arctognathus whaitsi remains enigmatic. Based on a skull with a long and low snout, 'A.' whaitsi represents a distinct taxon unlike the short-snouted A. curvimola but comparable to specimens identified as Cyonosaurus and Lycaenops (originally Aelurognathus) minor. Indeed, Sigogneau-Russell tentatively suggested A. whaitsi was synonymous with the latter in 1970. However, determining the affinities of 'A.' whaitsi likewise requires a revision of these genera and other small long-snouted gorgonopsians.

== Description ==
Arctognathus is a medium-sized gorgonopsian, characterised by a proportionately short and deep snout, occupying roughly only 40% of the skull's length. The holotype and largest specimen of Arctognathus has a skull length estimated to be 21 centimetres (8.3 in) long from a preserved 11 centimetres (4.3 in) long snout (based on proportions of complete skulls).

== Classification ==
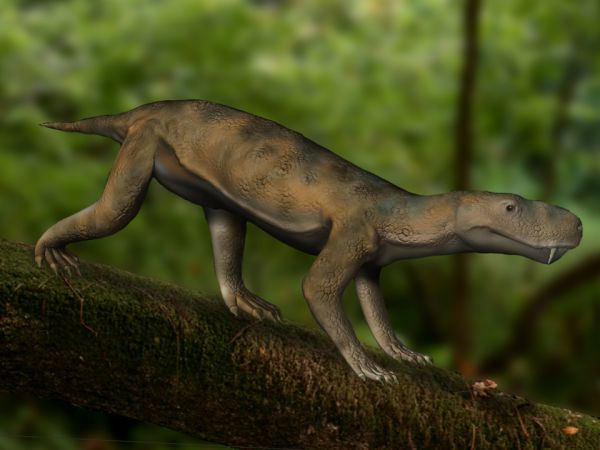
Artist's interpretation of A. curvimola in environment

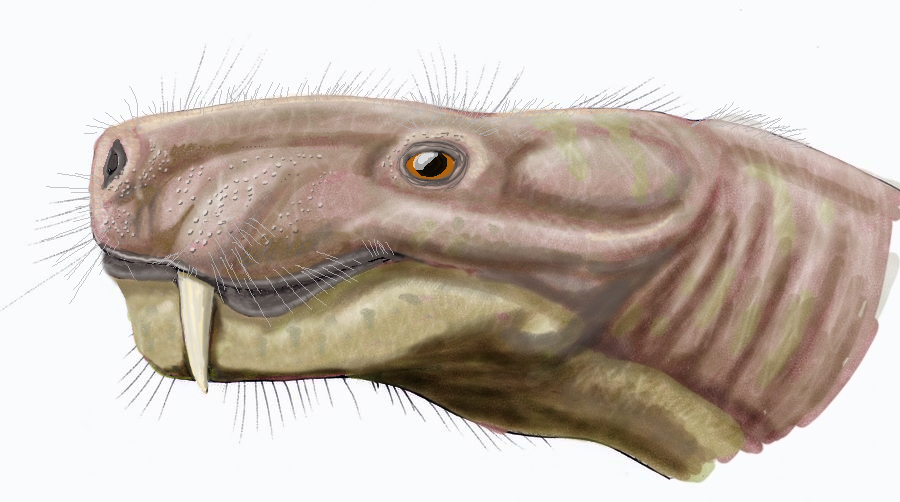
Artist's interpretation of the head of A. curvimola

Arctognathus is a gorgonopsian, a type of carnivorous therapsid. The classification of gorgonopsians has historically been poorly understood, and the higher taxonomy of the group remains unsettled. Nonetheless, the evolutionary relationships (phylogenetics) of gorgonopsians has been extensively tested. Most gorgonopsians fall into one of two subclades of either Russian or African origin. Arctognathus has consistently been found within the so-called "African clade" with a relatively close but uncertain relationship to the large rubidgeines, Smilesaurus, Arctops and Lycaenops.

A phylogenetic analysis performed by Gebauer and Michael Maisch when formally describing Njalila in 2026 found it an Arctognathus to be sister taxa, potentially reflective of their historically proposed affinities. However, this relationship is not well supported, and there are no synapomorphies (uniquely shared) traits to unite them as each other's closest relatives. Below is a cladogram modified and simplified from the 2026 analysis of Gebauer and Maisch:

- Gorgonopsia
  - Nochnitsa geminidens
  - - Viatkogorgon ivakhnenkoi
    - - "Russian clade"
        - Suchogorgon golubevi
        - - Sauroctonus progressus
          - - Pravoslavlevia parva
            - - Inostrancevia africana
              - Inostrancevia alexandri
      - "African clade"
        - - Eriphostoma microdon
          - - Gorgonops torvus
            - - Cynariops robustus
              - - - Arctognathus curvimola
                  - Njalila nasuta
                - Lycaenops ornatus
                - Smilesaurus ferox
                - Arctops willistoni
                - Rubidgeinae
                  ⊞
                  - Aelurognathus tigriceps
                  - - Ruhuhucerberus haughtoni
                    - - - Sycosaurus laticeps
                        - Sycosaurus nowaki
                      - Rubidgeini
                        - Leontosaurus vanderhorsti
                        - - Dinogorgon rubidgei
                          - - Clelandina rubidgei
                            - Rubidgea atrox
                  ⊟

== See also ==
- List of therapsids

== Bibliography ==
- Kemp, T.S. (September 4, 1969). "On the Functional Morphology of the Gorgonopsid Skull" (PDF). Philosophical Transactions of the Royal Society of London. Series B, Biological Sciences. 256 (801): 1–83. Bibcode:1969RSPTB.256....1K. doi:10.1098/rstb.1969.0036. Archived from the original (PDF) on 19 October 2012.
- Sidor, Christian A. (2003). "Evolutionary trends and the origin of the mammalian lower jaw" (PDF). Paleobiology. 29 (4): 605–640. doi:10.1666/0094-8373(2003)029<0605:etatoo>2.0.co;2. Archived from the original (PDF) on 3 March 2016.
