= Duzhong Park =

Urban park in Beijing, China

- Type: Urban park
- Location: Beijing, China
- Area: 60 hectares (150 acres)
- Created: 2008
- Status: Open all year

Duzhong Park (Chinese: 杜仲公园; lit. 'Eucommia Park') is a major city park in the eastern edge of central urban Beijing. It is located in Chaoyang District, right next to the 5th Ring Road, and is created based on a forest of eucommia ulmoides. It is one of the 15 earliest suburban public parks created by Beijing government in 2008.
