= Eucommia constans =

Eucommia constans Temporal range: Miocene–Pleistocene

Scientific classification
- Kingdom: Plantae
- Clade: Tracheophytes
- Clade: Angiosperms
- Clade: Eudicots
- Clade: Asterids
- Order: Garryales
- Family: Eucommiaceae
- Genus: Eucommia
- Species: E. constans

Binomial name
- Eucommia constans Magallón-Puebla and Cevallos-Ferriz

Extinct species of flowering plant

Eucommia constans is an extinct species of flowering plant in the family Eucommiaceae. Eucommia is a genus of small trees now native to China, with a fossil record that shows a much wider distribution. E. constans is known from fossil fruits found in Miocene to Pleistocene deposits of east-central Mexico. E. constans is one of five described fossil species from North America assigned to the modern genus Eucommia. The other species are E. eocenica, E. jeffersonensis, E. montana, and E. rowlandii.

== History and classification ==
Eucommia constans was first identified by Susana Magallón-Puebla and Sergio R. S. Cevallos-Ferriz in 1994 from the Miocene to Pleistocene Pié de Vaca Formation which outcrops in the state of Puebla in East-central Mexico. The species is the only record of the genus Eucommia in Mexico, and is the youngest occurrence of Eucommia in North America. E. constans is also the southernmost occurrence of Eucommia in North America, and when first described the species was the southernmost species to be described in world. The species was described from a group of over one-hundred and fifty compression fossils studied by Magallón-Puebla and Cevallos-Ferriz who published their findings in an International Journal of Plant Sciences article. The holotype specimen, IGM-PB 2573–632, is preserved in the paleontological collections housed in the Instituto Geologica which is part of the National Autonomous University of Mexico in Mexico City, Mexico.

== Description ==
The ellipsoidal fruits of E. constans range from 9.4 to 15.6 millimetres (0.37 to 0.61 in) in length and they vary in width from 4.4 to 7.2 millimetres (0.17 to 0.28 in) with a typically tapering and long stipe. While the tip of the fruit is quite rounded, the stigmatic notch is placed off center from the tip. While very similar in appearance to E. montana the two are distinguishable by the larger size and longer stipe of E. constans. E. eocenica is larger than E. constans and is notably different in the structure of the fruit tip, which is distinctly pointed rather than rounded as seen in E. constans.
