= Eucommia jeffersonensis =

Eucommia jeffersonensis Temporal range: Late Eocene

Scientific classification
- Kingdom: Plantae
- Clade: Tracheophytes
- Clade: Angiosperms
- Clade: Eudicots
- Clade: Asterids
- Order: Garryales
- Family: Eucommiaceae
- Genus: Eucommia
- Species: E. jeffersonensis

Binomial name
- Eucommia jeffersonensis Call & Dilcher

Extinct species of tree

Eucommia jeffersonensis is an extinct species of flowering plant in the family Eucommiaceae. It is known from a fossil fruit found in latest Eocene deposits of Oregon, United States. E. jeffersonensis is one of five described fossil species from North America assigned to the modern genus Eucommia. The other species are E. constans, E. eocenica, E. montana, and E. rolandii.

== History and classification ==
Eucommia jeffersonensis is known only from a single fossil, the holotype, specimen UF 11053, which is housed in the paleobotanical collections of the Florida Museum of Natural History. The specimen, a partially complete mature fruit, is preserved as a compression fossil in lacustrian shale recovered from the Gray Butte flora exposed near the base of Gray Butte in Oregon. The Gray Butte fora was formerly considered part of the youngest Clarno Formation and plants found almost exclusively in the Clarno formation are present at Gray Butte. The flora also hosts plants almost exclusively in the John Day Formation that overlies the Clarno Formation, and has more recently been considered part of the John Day Formation. Fossils from the similarly aged White Cap Knoll location in Wheeler County, Oregon have been assigned to E. montana, which indicates at least two species of Eucommia were present in Oregon during the latest Eocene. Eucommia jeffersonensis was first studied by paleobotanists Victor B. Call and David L. Dilcher, both of the University of Florida in Gainesville. Call and Dilcher's 1997 type description of the new species was published in the botanical journal American Journal of Botany. The specific epithet jeffersonensis was chosen as a reference to Jefferson County, Oregon where the Gray Butte Flora outcrops and the species type locality is.

== Description ==
The incomplete fruit of E. jeffersonensis is 12.7 millimetres (0.50 in) long when the missing tip area and stipe are excluded. The total width of the fruit is 7.1 millimetres (0.28 in), and the stipe itself is 7.9 millimetres (0.31 in) in length. The stipe, or stem which attached the fruit to the tree, is located at the base of the fruit. The fruit body smoothly narrows down to the beginning of the stipe, which further narrows. The structure of the fruit tip is uncertain due to the incomplete nature of the fossil but it appears to have been pointed in general shape. As with other Eucommia species, the fruit is a samara composed of two flattened nutlets, termed carpels, with a narrow surrounding wing. As is normal for the genus, only one of the two carpels fully matured while the other carpel remained a narrow mass along the edge of the mature fruit. The single mature fruit results in an asymmetrical structuring of the fruit. Unlike other Eucomia species, the infertile carpel has not one but two dorsal carpel strands, vessels that start at the stipe and curve around the margin of the fruit wing, joining together at the tip of the fruit. The two strands of the infertile fruit both branch off the stipe and parallel each other for a short distance along the margin before they merge. Overall, E. montana fruits are shorter in length than the E. jeffersonensis fruit, and with the exception of two specimens, E. eocenica fruits are longer than E. jeffersonensis. The two are distinguishable by the larger size and longer stipe of E. constans. E. eocenica is larger than E. constans and is notably different in the structure of the fruit tip, which is distinctly pointed rather than rounded as in E. constans.
