= Eucommia rolandii =

Eucommia rolandii Temporal range: Middle Eocene

Scientific classification
- Kingdom: Plantae
- Clade: Tracheophytes
- Clade: Angiosperms
- Clade: Eudicots
- Clade: Asterids
- Order: Garryales
- Family: Eucommiaceae
- Genus: Eucommia
- Species: E. rolandii

Binomial name
- Eucommia rolandii Call & Dilcher

Extinct species of tree

Eucommia rolandii is an extinct species of flowering plant in the family Eucommiaceae. E. rolandii is known from four fossil leaves found in Middle Eocene deposits of British Columbia, Canada and Mississippi, United States. E. rolandii is one of five described fossil species from North America assigned to the modern genus Eucommia. The other species are E. constans, E. eocenica, E. jeffersonensis, and E. montana.

== History and classification ==
Eucommia rolandii is known from only two fossils, a holotype and an additional specimen referred to the species. The holotype, specimen UF 11034, is housed in the paleobotanical collections of the Florida Museum of Natural History, and is from Middle Eocene rocks of the Talahatta Formation. The specimen was recovered from strata exposed in the Bovay Clay pit near Holly Springs, Mississippi. The other fossil is marked as specimen SFU 14748, and is part of the collections at Simon Fraser University. SFU 14748 is composed of three attached leaves in association with, but not attached to, fruits identified as from the species E. montana collected from the Quilchena locality in British Columbia. Eucommia rolandii was first studied by paleobotanists Victor B. Call and David L. Dilcher, both of the University of Florida in Gainesville. Call and Dilcher's 1997 type description of the new species was published in the botanical journal American Journal of Botany. The specific epithet rolandii was chosen in honor of the American paleobotanist Roland W. Brown who was responsible for the first identification of Eocommia fossils found in North America.

== Description ==
The leaves are elliptical in overall shape with a pointed base and a tip that gradually tapers to a point. The length of the leaves ranges up to 10 cm (3.9 in) with a width that can reach half that at 5 cm (2.0 in). A petiole up to 2 cm (0.79 in) long is attached at the base. The leaves have a single main vein with at least five alternating pairs of secondary veins placed along its length. The lower secondary veins have a brochidodromous structuring, forming large loops that do not reach the leaf margin but curve up and attach to the next secondary up. The secondaries near the tip have a similar looping structure, but with a series of smaller loops formed by cross-veins rather than the single continuous loop of the basal secondaries. Tertiary veins run from the main vein out to the margin, some forking, and all straight to slightly wavy. The finer vein structure forms a network of irregularly shaped, polygonal areolae. The margins of the leaves are serrated, with the teeth having a strong curve towards the leave tip. This results in the teeth often being pressed against the leaf margin above the tooth or against the base of the next tooth along the margin. The middle area of each tooth hosts very small veins originating in the marginal vein structure. E. rolandii leaves are notable for the preserved latex that is found on them. All the studied leaves of E. rolandii have small bundles of latex filaments that are found in all the veins. The filaments are rarely found in the areolae that are formed by the veins.
