= Geniposidic acid =

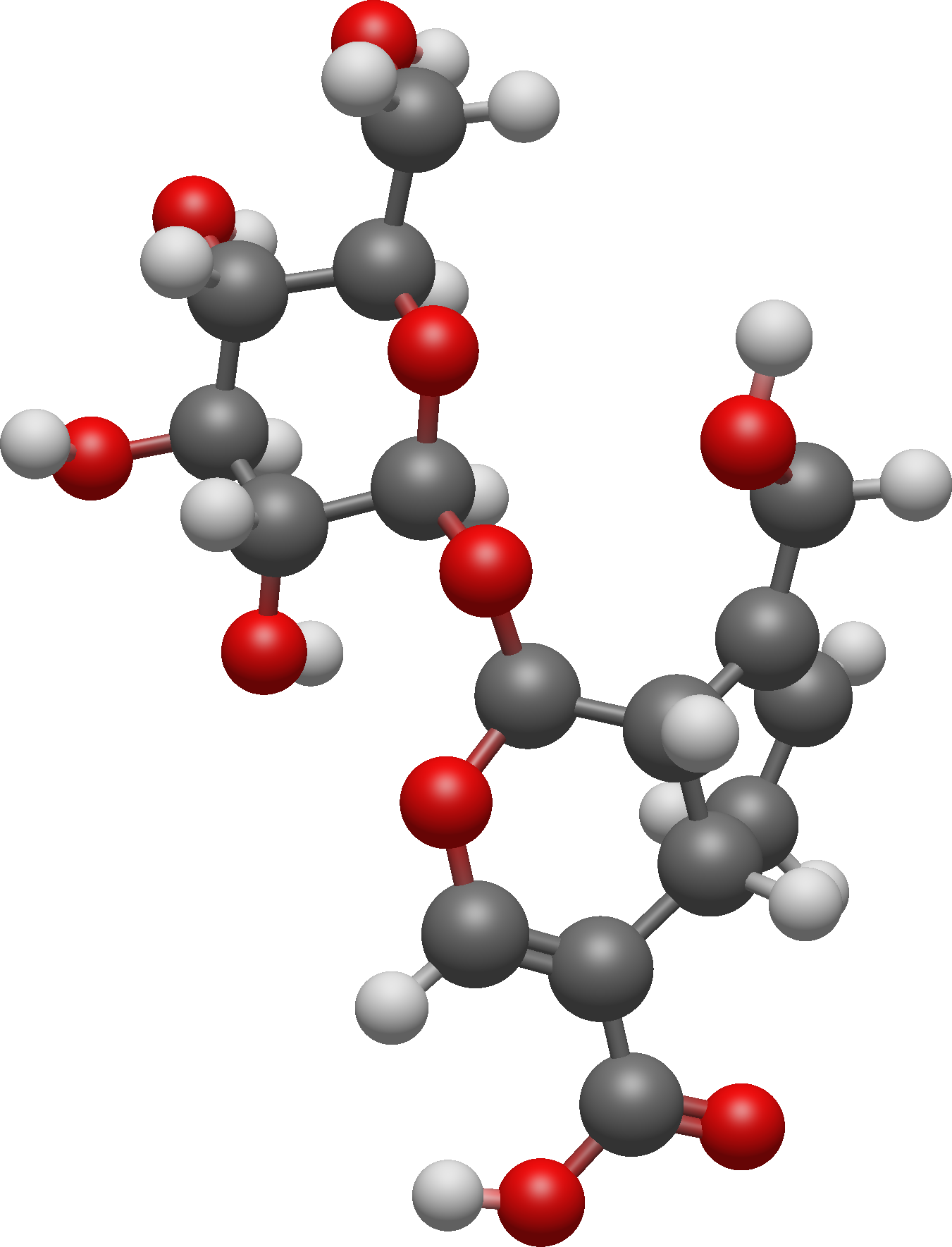

Names
- IUPAC name (1S,4aS,7aS)-1-(β-D-Glucopyranosyloxy)-7-(hydroxymethyl)-1,4a,5,7a-tetrahydrocyclopenta[c]pyran-4-carboxylic acid
- Systematic IUPAC name (1S,4aS,7aS)-7-(Hydroxymethyl)-1-{[(2S,3R,4S,5S,6R)-3,4,5-trihydroxy-6-(hydroxymethyl)oxan-2-yl]oxy}-1,4a,5,7a-tetrahydrocyclopenta[c]pyran-4-carboxylic acid

Identifiers
CAS Number	27741-01-1
3D model (JSmol)	Interactive image
ChEMBL	ChEMBL460031
ChemSpider	391590
ECHA InfoCard	100.208.674
PubChem CID	443354
CompTox Dashboard (EPA)	DTXSID40182091
- InChI: InChI=1S/C16H22O10/c17-3-6-1-2-7-8(14(22)23)5-24-15(10(6)7)26-16-13(21)12(20)11(19)9(4-18)25-16/h1,5,7,9-13,15-21H,2-4H2,(H,22,23)/t7-,9-,10-,11-,12+,13-,15+,16+/m1/s1
- SMILES: O=C(O)\C2=C\O[C@@H](O[C@@H]1O[C@@H]([C@@H](O)[C@H](O)[C@H]1O)CO)[C@@H]3C(=C/C[C@H]23)\CO

Properties
Chemical formula	C_{16}H_{22}O_{10}
Molar mass	374.342 g·mol^{−1}
- Except where otherwise noted, data are given for materials in their standard state (at 25 °C [77 °F], 100 kPa). Infobox references

Geniposidic acid is a natural chemical compound, classified as an iridoid glucoside, found in a variety of plants including Eucommia ulmoides and Gardenia jasminoides.
