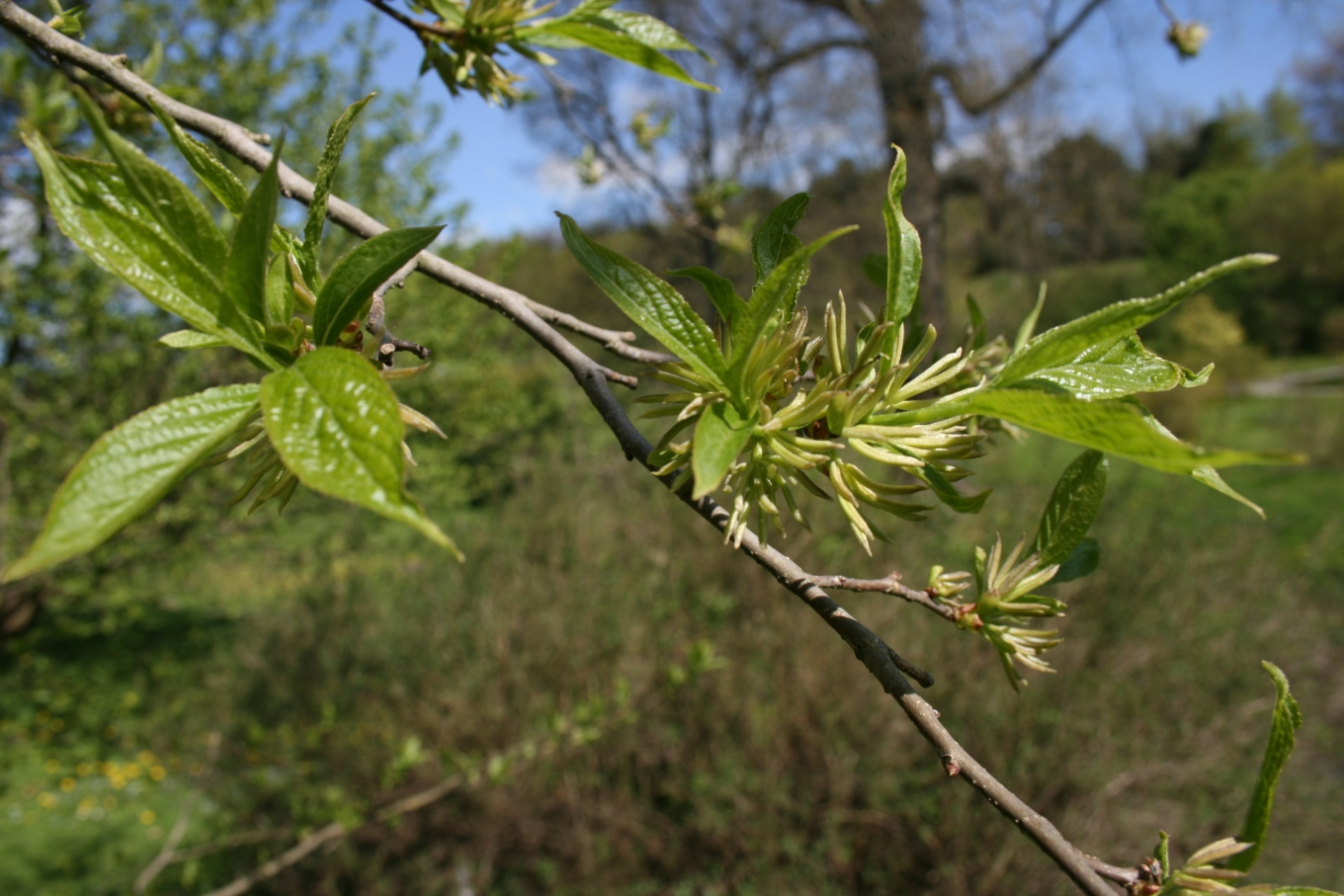
- Eucommia ulmoides foliage and flowers

Scientific classification
- Kingdom: Plantae
- Clade: Embryophytes
- Clade: Tracheophytes
- Clade: Spermatophytes
- Clade: Angiosperms
- Clade: Eudicots
- Clade: Asterids
- Order: Garryales
- Family: Eucommiaceae; Engl.
- Genus: Eucommia; Oliv.

Species
- See text

= Eucommia =

Genus of trees

Eucommia is a genus of small trees now native to China, with a fossil record that shows a much wider distribution. The single living species, Eucommia ulmoides, is vulnerable in the wild, but is widely cultivated in China for its bark, and is highly valued in herbology such as traditional Chinese medicine.

== Description ==
Modern Eucommia trees grow to about 15 m tall. The leaves are deciduous, arranged alternately, simple ovate with an acuminate tip, 8–16 cm (3.1–6.3 in) long, and with a serrated margin. If a leaf is torn across, strands of latex exude from the leaf veins and solidify into rubber and hold the two parts of the leaf together. It flowers from March to May with the flowers being inconspicuous, small, and greenish. The fruits ripen between June and November and are a winged samara with one seed, very similar to an elm samara in appearance. The modern fruits are 2–3 cm (0.79–1.18 in) long and 1–2 cm (0.39–0.79 in) broad, while fruits of the extinct species range up to 21 millimetres (0.83 in) long.

Eucommia is dioecious, with separate male and female plants.

== Taxonomy ==
Eucommia is the sole member of the family Eucommiaceae, and was formerly considered to be a separate order, the Eucommiales. The modern species is sometimes known as the "hard rubber tree", "Gutta-percha tree" or "Chinese rubber tree", but is not related to either the true Gutta-percha tree of southeastern Asia, nor to the South American rubber tree.

- Eucommia
  - †Eucommia constans (Miocene-Pliocene; Mexico)
  - †Eucommia eocenica (Middle Eocene; Mississippi Embayment)
  - †Eucommia europaea (Oligocene; Europe)
  - †Eucommia jeffersonensis (latest Eocene; Oregon)
  - †Eucommia montana (Early-Late Eocene; western North America)
  - †Eucommia rolandii (Early-Middle Eocene; Mississippi and British Columbia)
  - Eucommia ulmoides (Living, central-eastern China)

== Medicinal use ==
Eucommia tea has been shown to somewhat lower blood pressure. It has been used and sold for a various other things. Research appears to be somewhat limited.

== Distribution ==
Eucommia ulmoides is native to forest areas on hills and mountains of the provinces in central and eastern China, though it has been suggested that the species is extinct in the wild. E. ulmoides is also occasionally planted in botanical gardens and other gardens in Europe, North America, and elsewhere, being of interest as the only cold-tolerant (to at least -30 °C) rubber-producing tree. Fossil species of Eucommia have been found in 10- to 35-million-year-old brown coal deposits in central Europe, in numerous fossil sites in Asia, and five different fossil species have been described from North America, indicating the genus had a much wider range in the past.
