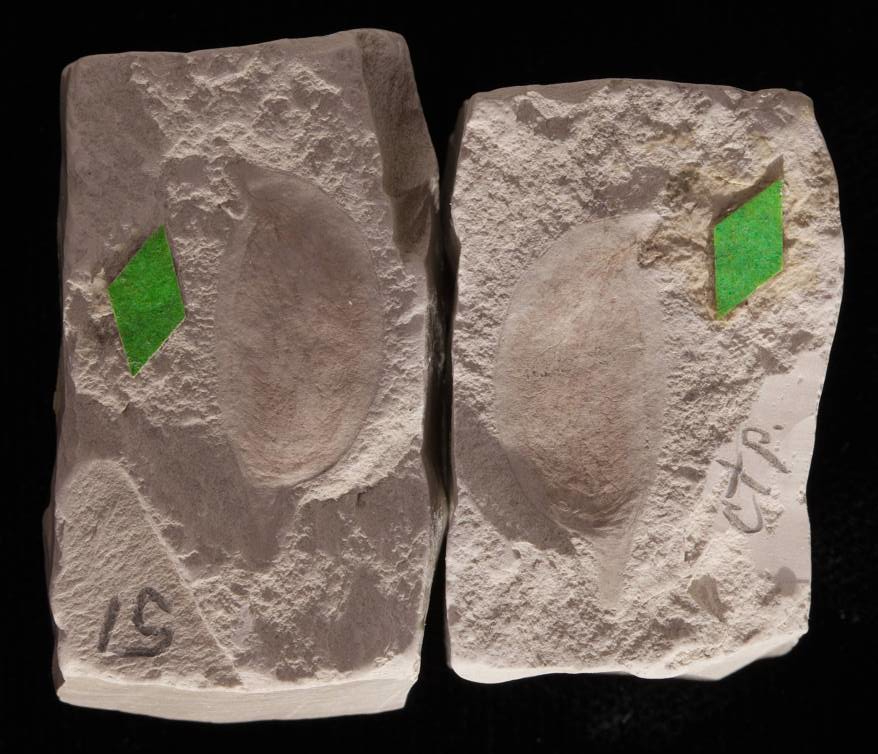
- Leguminosites copaiferanus holotype

Scientific classification
- Kingdom: Plantae
- Clade: Tracheophytes
- Clade: Angiosperms
- Clade: Eudicots
- Clade: Asterids
- Order: Garryales
- Family: Eucommiaceae
- Genus: Eucommia
- Species: E. eocenica

Binomial name
- Eucommia eocenica (Berry) Brown

Synonyms
- Carpolithus banisteroides; Leguminosites copaiferanus?; Simaroubites eocenica

= Eucommia eocenica =

Eucommia eocenica Temporal range: Middle Eocene

Extinct species of tree

Eucommia eocenica is an extinct species of flowering plant in the family Eucommiaceae. E. eocenica is known from fossil fruits found in the middle Eocene Claiborne Formation deposits of the southeastern United States. E. eocenica is one of five described fossil species from North America assigned to the modern genus Eucommia. The other species are E. constans, E. jeffersonensis, E. montana, and E. rowlandii.

== History and classification ==
Eucommia eocenica is known from a number of specimens recovered from Claiborne Formation fossil sites in Tennessee, Missouri, and Mississippi. Two fossils of the species were first described by Edward W. Berry in 1930 from the Holly Hills sand of Tennessee as Carpolithus banisteroides and Simaroubites eocenica respectively. The two fossils were reexamined by Roland W. Brown in 1940, who recognized them to belong to the same species. Brown moved the species to Eucommia as Eucommia eocenica and made Carpolithus banisteroides a synonym. The species was again examined in 1997 by paleobotanists Victor B. Call and David L. Dilcher, both of the University of Florida in Gainesville. In their reexamination they noted that the species Leguminosites copaiferanus which was also described by Berry in 1930 is likely also a E. eocenica fruit rather than a separate taxon.

== Description ==
The asymmetrical fruits of E. eocenica are composed of two flattened nutlets with narrow surrounding wings. The fruit tips are generally pointed. The fruits range from 11.5 to 21 millimetres (0.45 to 0.83 in) in length with an average length of 15.1 millimetres (0.59 in). They vary in width from 4.5 to 8.2 millimetres (0.18 to 0.32 in). E. eocenica stipes are attached to the base of the fruit at an angle of 45°, with a length ranging from 2.5 to 5 millimetres (0.098 to 0.197 in). Almost all known specimens of E. eocenica are composed of a single mature carpel, with the second carpel present as a narrow strip of tissue found on the underside of the mature carpel. One known specimen is of a fruit with two mature carpels. In that specimen the fruit shows bilateral symmetry, with the stipe and the suture between the carpels being placed centrally, rather than along one side as is seen in the asymmetrical specimens. The fossils show a net of small polymerized latex veins. The latex, which still retains its elasticity, ranges in coloration from golden brown in more oxidized specimens to a dark brown in less oxidized specimens.
