= Susana Aurora Magallón Puebla =

Mexican biologist

Susana Aurora Magallón Puebla is a Mexican biologist and scientist. Her research areas are evolutionary biology and bioinformatics, mainly focused on plant evolution. In 2019 she was appointed director of the UNAM Institute of Biology for the period 2019–2023. In 2022, she was named a fellow of the American Academy of Arts and Sciences.

She graduated from National Autonomous University of Mexico, and University of Chicago .

She is editor of New Phytologist.
