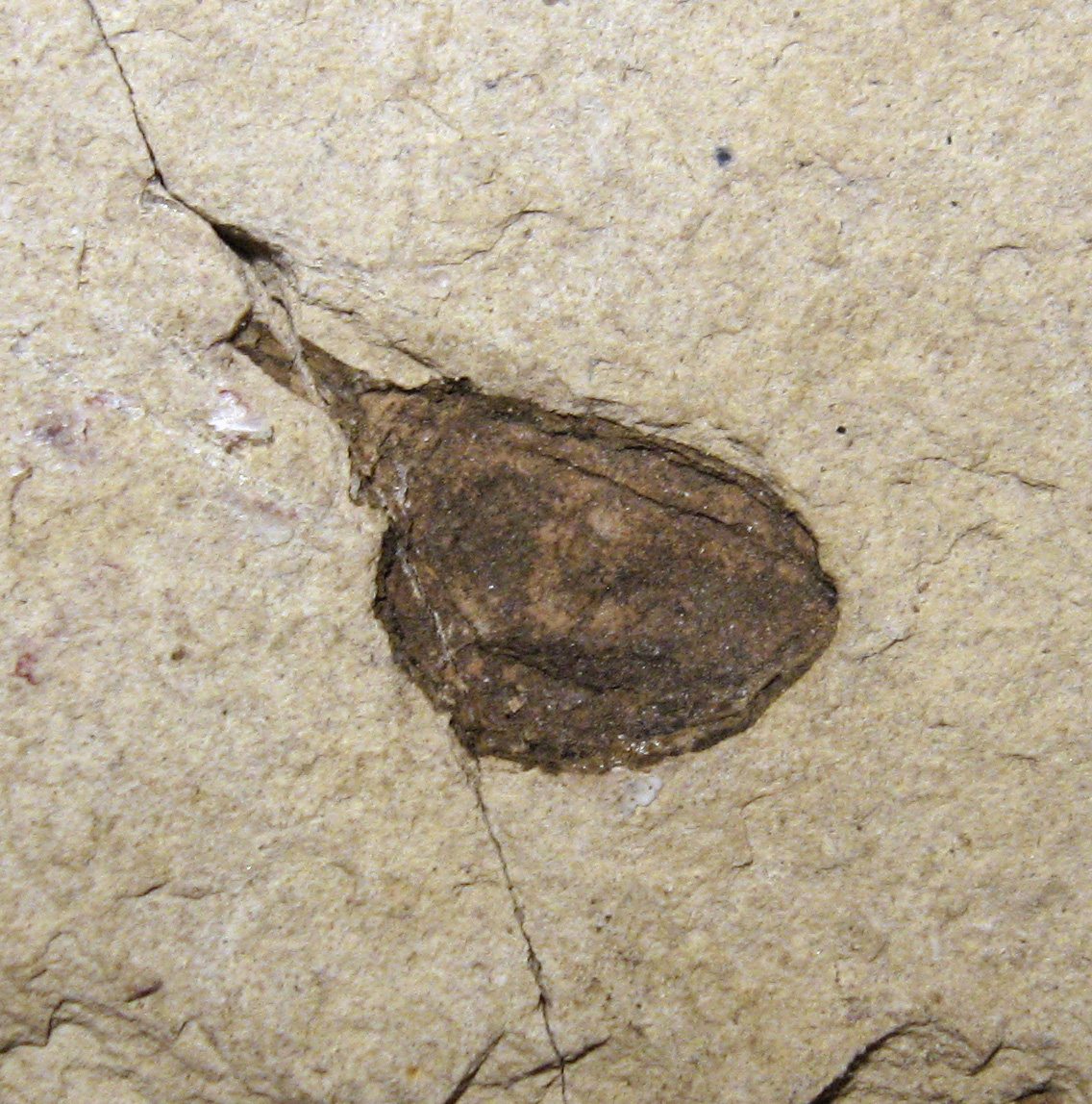
- E. montana, Washington state

Scientific classification
- Kingdom: Plantae
- Clade: Tracheophytes
- Clade: Angiosperms
- Clade: Eudicots
- Clade: Asterids
- Order: Garryales
- Family: Eucommiaceae
- Genus: Eucommia
- Species: E. montana

Binomial name
- Eucommia montana Brown

Synonyms
- Eucommia brownii

= Eucommia montana =

Eucommia montana Temporal range: Eocene

Extinct species of tree

Eucommia montana is an extinct species of flowering plant in the family Eucommiaceae. E. montana is known from fossil fruits found in Eocene deposits of the northwestern United States southeastern British Columbia south to Oregon and east to Montana and Colorado. E. montana is one of five described fossil species from North America assigned to the modern genus Eucommia. The other species are E. constans, E. eocenica, E. jeffersonensis, and E. rowlandii.

== History and classification ==
Eucommia montana was first described by Roland W. Brown in 1940 from the late Eocene Renova Formation which outcrops near Grant in Beaverhead County, Montana. Further collecting in outcrops of Passamari Formation in the Ruby River Basin of southwestern Montana lead to the description of another species, Eucommia brownii by Herman F. Becker in 1960. This was based on an apparent smaller size to the fruits found in the Passamari formation. However, further collecting in the 1960s showed a range of size greater than first thought and led to Becker reassigning the fossils to E. montana in 1969. The Fossils were again examined in 1997 by paleobotanists Victor Call and David Dilcher, both of the University of Florida in Gainesville. In the reassessment of the species, Call and Dilcher expanded both the chronostratigraphic and geographic range for the species by assigning a number of fossils from locations across western North America to E. montana. In addition to the Ruby basin and Grant fossils, fossils from middle Eocene rocks in the Beaverhead Basins of Beaverhead County (Montana) were assigned to E. montana. The western most occurrence of the species is found in the Ypresian Klondike Mountain Formation of Northern Washington state. The slightly younger Coldwater Beds outcropping near Quilchena, British Columbia where the species is associated with the leaf morphospecies Eucommia rolandii are the northern most. Fossils recovered from the Ypresian Green River Formation outcrops near Rainbow, Utah, Wardell Ranch and Douglas Pass, Colorado extended the geographic range to the south. Fossils from both the middle Eocene Clarno Formation and the late Eocene John Day Formation extended the southwestern range of the species into Central Oregon. Among the youngest occurrences of the species are fossils from the Late Eocene Florissant Formation of Colorado. All the fossils studied from Washington, British Columbia, Oregon, Colorado, and Utah fall into the range of variation seen in specimens from the Renova Formation. The Clarno formation specimens show a slightly lower average length to width ratio, but were still assigned to E. montana.

== Description ==
The asymmetrical fruits of Eucommia montana are composed of two flattened nutlets with narrow surrounding wings. The fruit tips are generally rounded with a stigmatic cleft located off center of the apex as a result of the fruit asymmetry. The fruits range from 5.2 to 11.4 millimetres (0.20 to 0.45 in) in length with an average length of 8.65 millimetres (0.341 in). They vary in width from 3.2 to 6.8 millimetres (0.13 to 0.27 in). Fruits of E. montana are composed of a single mature carpel, with the second carpel present as a narrow strip of tissue that is usually just over half the length of the mature carpel. The presence of preserved, polymerized latex threads on the fossils from Quilchena and the Klondike Mountain Formation confirm the fossils are Eucommia seeds.
