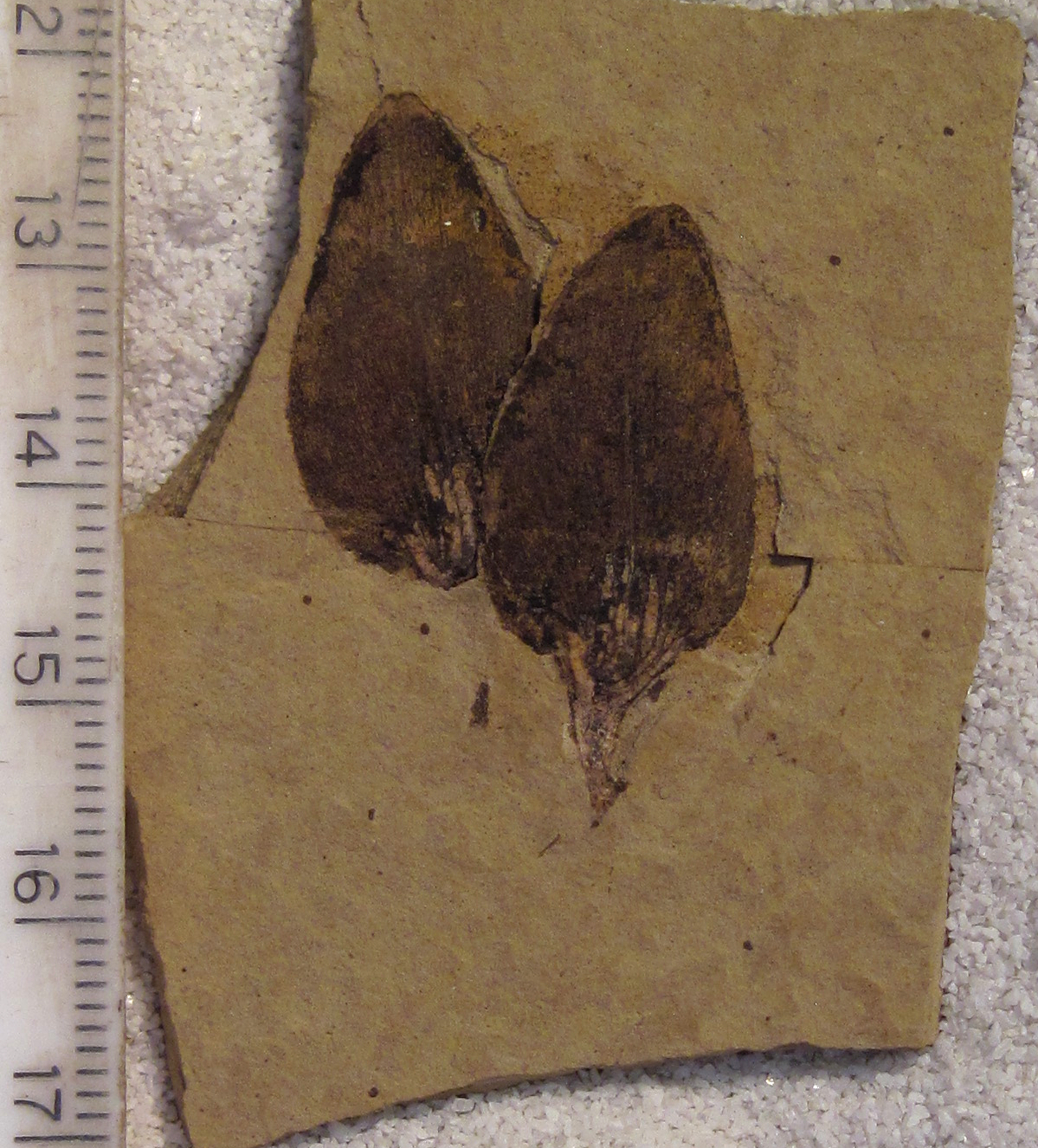
- Cone scales from the Klondike Mountain Formation SRIC specimen SR 06-19-03

Scientific classification
- Kingdom: Plantae
- Clade: Tracheophytes
- Clade: Gymnosperms
- Division: Pinophyta
- Class: Pinopsida
- Order: Pinales
- Family: Pinaceae
- Genus: Pseudolarix
- Species: †P. wehrii

Binomial name
- †Pseudolarix wehrii Gooch, 1992

Synonyms
- †Pseudolarix americana Brown

= Pseudolarix wehrii =

Pseudolarix wehrii Temporal range: Ypresian – Lutetian

Extinct species of conifer

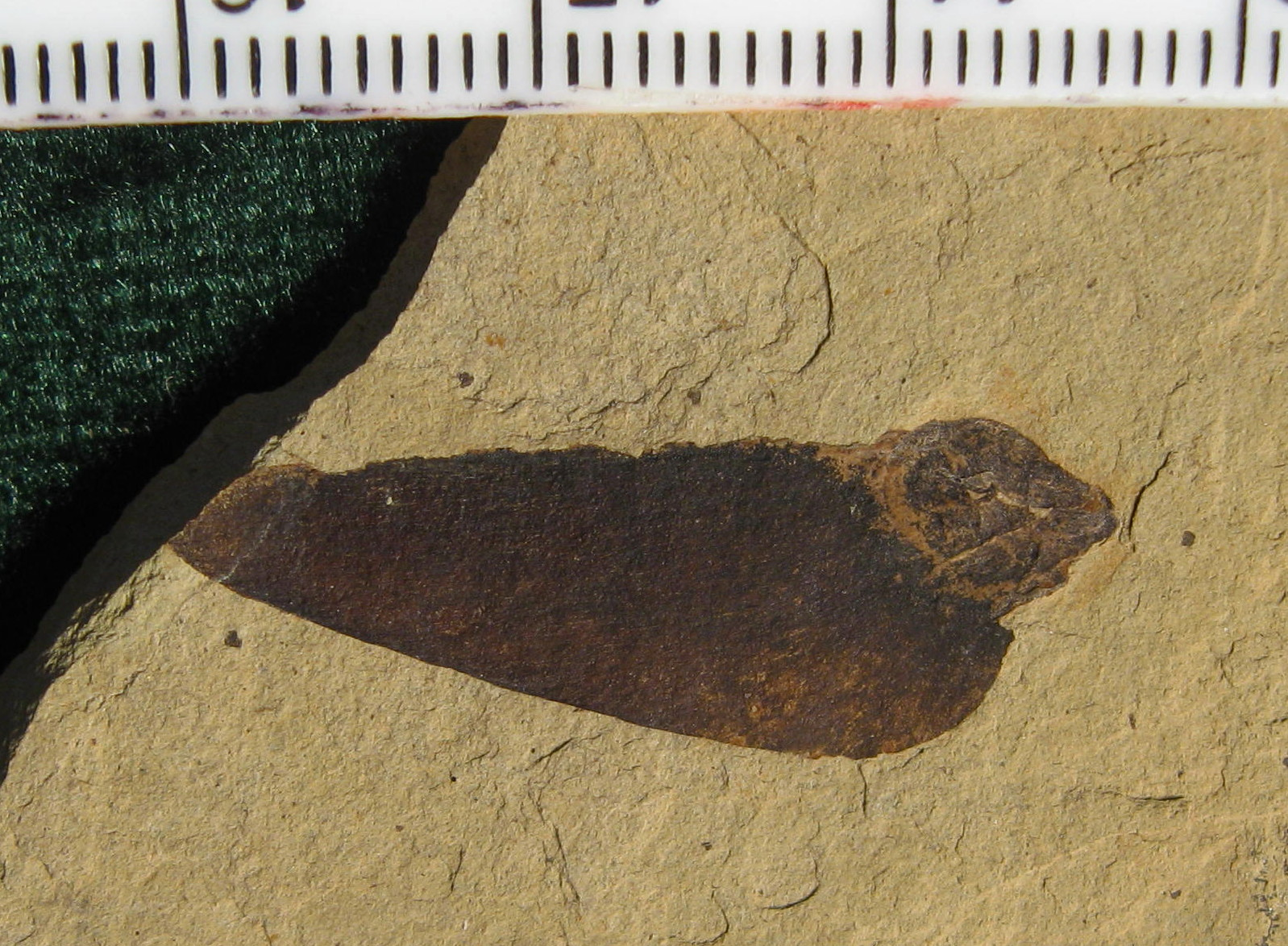
Pseudolarix wehrii winged seed

Pseudolarix wehrii is an extinct species of golden larch in the pine family (Pinaceae). The species is known from early Eocene fossils of northern Washington state, United States, and southern British Columbia, Canada, along with late Eocene mummified fossils found in the Qikiqtaaluk Region, Nunavut, Canada.

== History and classification ==
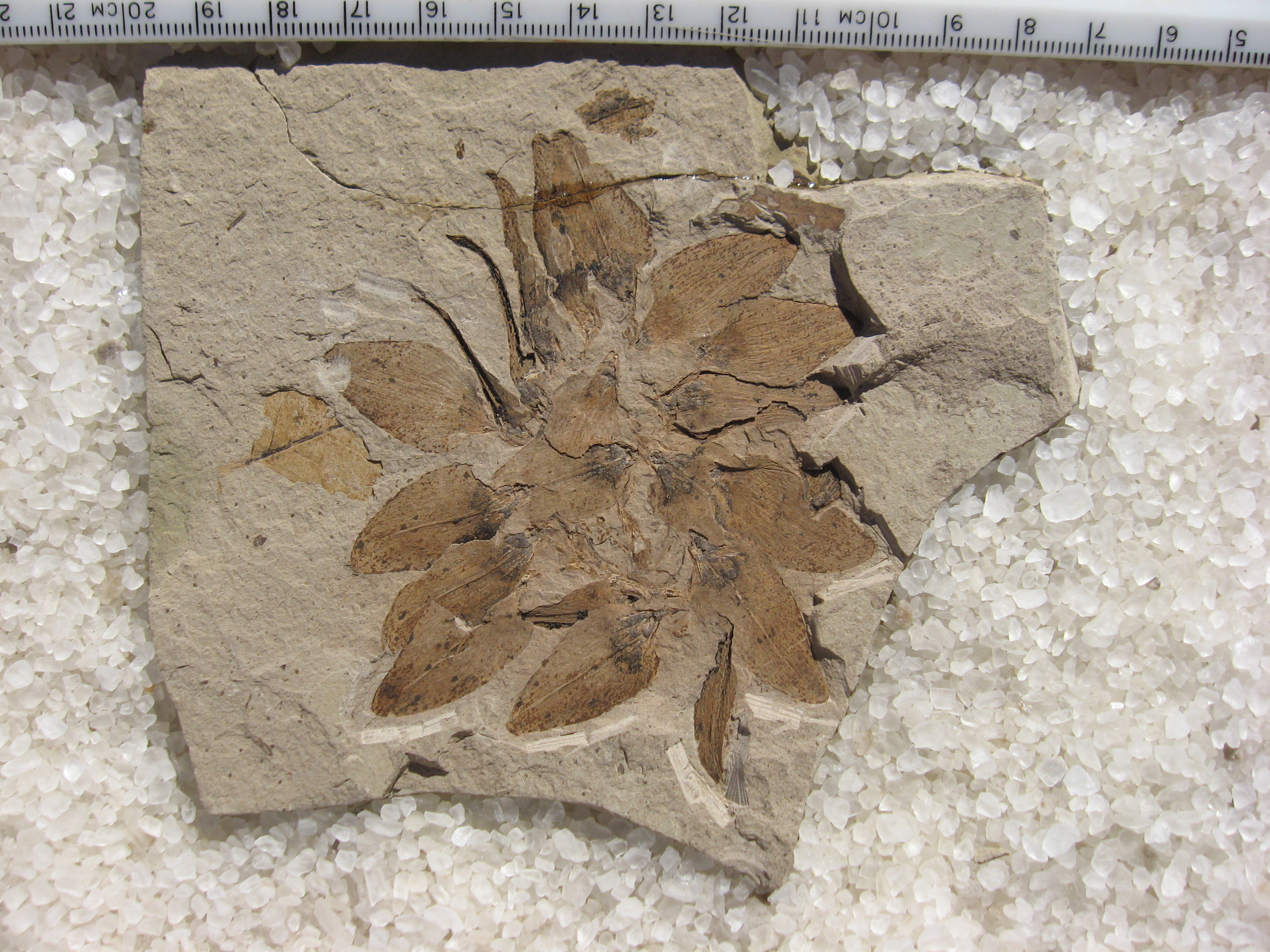
P. wehrii cone, originally figured by Gooch, 1992

The first description of Pseudolarix wehrii was by Roland W. Brown (1936). He made a brief description with figure of a cone scale he classed as Picea, which was collected by him during 1934 field work in Republic. Brown noted, at the time, the marked similarity between the Klondike Mountain Formation fossil and modern Pseudolarix amabilis of China, but that the fossil lacked the conspicuous bract that is typical for that genus. Lacking the bract, he considered it more likely that the cone scale belonged to a spruce species. Four years later, Brown (1940) again addressed the cone scale fossil. At that time he had changed opinion on the placement, saying it was likely to be a Pseudolarix, and proposed the species name Pseudolarix americana. Brown did a subsequent collecting trip to the Republic area in 1941, during which he collected needle and seed fossils that he also assigned to P. americana in 1943. Brown elaborated on his reassignment of the original conescale, noting that the fossil did not display characters that would indicate persistent attachment to a cone such as would be seen with Picea. None of Brown's papers contained a detailed description of the fossils or designation of type specimens for the species, with only sketched illustrations of a needle, cone scale and seed provided in 1943; the 1936 paper had a single photograph.

P. americana was briefly revisited, and its fossil distribution was expanded by Chester A. Arnold (1955), who described a series of fossils collected by him and his sons during a visit to the Princeton area in August 1953. Among the Allenby Formation specimens collected were several seeds, a cone scale, and a dwarf shoot with attached needles which he assigned to Pseudolarix americana. Unfortunately, sometime after publication, Arnold's 1953 fossils were subsequently lost.

Nancy L. Gooch (1992) reinvestigated the Pseudolarix fossils from both the Republic and Princeton floras, culminating in the description of a new species and the renaming of Brown's species. Gooch noted the nomen nudum status of Pseudolarix americana, which lacked type description; full type descriptions of the two distinct species were made. The long-bracted Republic flora species, which Brown had identified as P. americana, was given the new name Pseudolarix wehrii, while the short bracted Princeton flora species prevalent in the Allenby Formation was described as "Pseudolarix arnoldii". Gooch studied a series of 183 fossils, comprising 136 winged seeds and 47 cone scales, all housed in the Burke Museum of Natural History and Culture paleobotanical collections in Seattle. The holotype for the new species, specimen UWBM 36990, is an isolated cone scale with preserved bract; the paratype series includes additional bracts and isolated winged seeds. The specific epithet wehrii was chosen to honor Burke Museum Affiliate Curator of Paleobotany and Northwest School artist Wesley C. Wehr, who collected over 180 of the specimens studied.

In 1991, James Bassinger first reported fossils of Pseudolarix were present in the Buchanan Lake Formation mummified forest, which had first been discovered in 1985. The fossils were fully described by LaPage & Bassinger (1995), who recognized both P. amabilis and P. wehrii fossils from the formation, based on the bract lengths of the two morphotypes they identified. They addressed the suggestion made by Gooch (1992) of P. wehrii being an ancestral species, noting that fossils assignable to P. amabilis are known from older Paleoecene and late Cretaceous formations. LaPage & Bassinger (1995), as well as Anderson and LaPage (1996), suggested P. wehrii may represent an extinct lineage of the genus that was only present in the Eocene, and was rarer than the contemporaneous P. amabilis.

== Distribution and paleoenvironment ==
The type locality for Pseudolarix wehrii is the Klondike Mountain Formation of north eastern Washington State, with further Ypresian fossils identified from the Allenby Formation. The Klondike Mountain Formation preserves an upland temperate flora which was first interpreted as being microthermal, however further study has shown the flora to be more mesothermal in nature. The plant community was a mixed conifer–broadleaf forest with large pollen elements of birch and golden larch, but also having notable traces of fir, spruce, cypress, and palm.

The Buchanan Lake Formation contains mummified forest outcrops near the Geodetic Hills of Axel Heiberg Island in the Canadian high arctic. The formation preserves flood and swamp environments that occupied a narrow valley basin supplied with sedimentation from the surrounding mountains. Due to rapid burial, low temperatures and oxygen deprivation, the fossils of the formation were mummified, rather than petrified or carbonized.

== Age ==
The oldest fossils assigned to P. wehrii date to the Ypresian, based on Potassium-argon radiometric dating for both the Klondike Mountain and Allenby Formations. Republic area fossils were first reported by Joseph Umpleby (1910), based on fish collected by him near the Tom Thumb mine, and given a tentative late Miocene age. This age was followed by Edward Berry (1929) who included the Republic fossils as part of the Latah Formation. This placement was challenged 7 years later when Roland W. Brown (1936) noted the similarities between Republic and other older fossil sites, combined with the Republic lake bed's underlying basalts (thought to be of similar age to the Columbia River Basalts). As such Brown placed the Republic fossils as a least Early Miocene in age and a separate formation from the Latah. Both Republic and Allenby formation fossils were assigned Oligocene ages by Arnold (1955).

In a later written communication circa 1958, Brown again revised the age still older, stating the fossils found in the area of Mount Elizabeth indicated an Oligocene age. This age was used by R.L. Parker and J. A. Calkins (1964), on their assessment of the Curlew Quadrangle of Ferry County. Since then, the fossil-bearing strata of the Formation have been radiometrically dated to give a current estimate of the Ypresian, the mid-stage of the early Eocene,49.4 ± .5 million years ago.

The youngest fossils are dated to the Middle Eocene Lutetian age of Northern Canada, based on floral and palynological evidence, though early work did not rule out the possibility of late Eocene to early Oligocene ages for the uppermost strata layers.

== Description ==
Gooch (1992) describes the cone scales as smooth margined and cupped towards the side which faced the cone axis. The scales have an overall slightly asymmetrical shovel shape, with lengths up to 3.2 cm (1.3 in) long by 1.8 cm (0.71 in) wide. The scale bases have a 0.50–0.75 cm (0.20–0.30 in) long stalk which connected to the central cone axis. On each side of the stalk are slightly enlarged lobes from the scale. On the inner side of the scale a bract is present, centered on the scale and running between 50% and 70% of the scale length. The bracts have a needle like appearance that tapers out from the pointed or slightly rounded tip to the widest point near the base, being up to 0.4 cm (0.16 in) wide and 2.4 cm (0.94 in) long. The wing seeds are up to 3.2 cm (1.3 in) long with a straight upper margin and a semi-elliptical to semi-cordate lower margin. The seeds contain large resin vessels and are up to .75 cm (0.30 in) with an obovate shape. LaPage and Bassinger (1995), emended the species description based on the mummified fossils of the Buchanan Lake formation. They reported the cone-scale bracts were resinous and sometimes exceeded the cone-scale lengths. The bracts also occasionally show a finely serrated margin and smooth in texture, with no fine hairs present.

Study of amber nodules fossilized on cone scales of both P. amabilis and P. wehrii from Axel Heiberg Island detected Succinic acid as part of the amber makeup. As is the case with modern P. amabilis resin, the amber identified from fossil P. amabilis cone scales have succinic acid as only a minor component of its chemistry. In contrast, succinic acid is a predominant chemical component of P. wehrii amber, which indicates the majority of loose amber in the Buchanan Lake Formation studied was produced by P. wehrii trees. The amber chemistry also has large proportions of abietane methyl ester skeletons in its pyrolysate.
