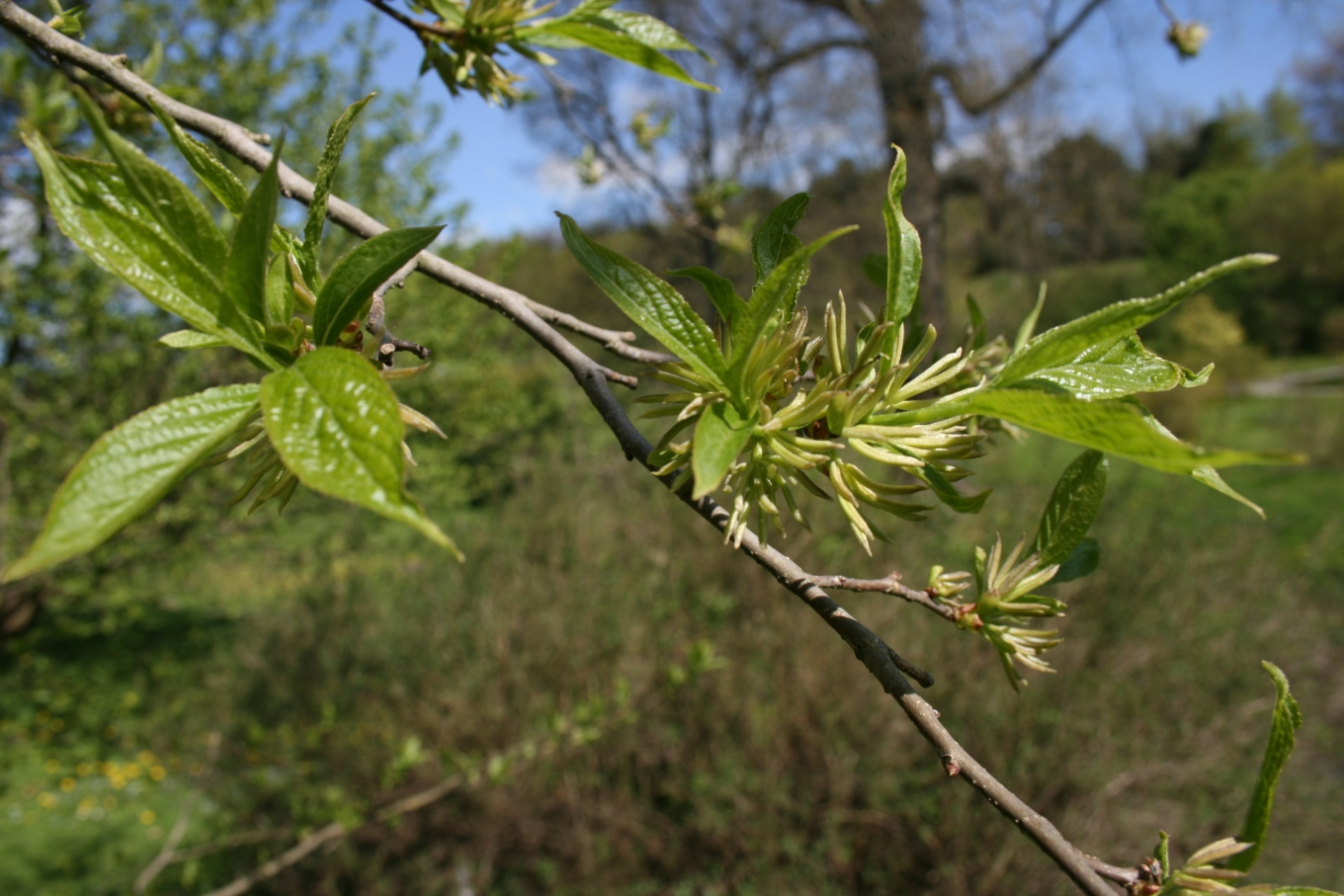
- Foliage and flowers

Conservation status
- Vulnerable (IUCN 3.1)

Scientific classification
- Kingdom: Plantae
- Clade: Embryophytes
- Clade: Tracheophytes
- Clade: Angiosperms
- Clade: Eudicots
- Clade: Asterids
- Order: Garryales
- Family: Eucommiaceae
- Genus: Eucommia
- Species: E. ulmoides

Binomial name
- Eucommia ulmoides Oliv.

= Eucommia ulmoides =

Species of tree

Eucommia ulmoides is a species of small tree native to China. It belongs to the monotypic family Eucommiaceae. It is considered vulnerable in the wild, but is widely cultivated in China for its bark and is highly valued in herbology such as traditional Chinese medicine.

== Description ==
Eucommia ulmoides grows to about 15 m tall. The leaves are deciduous, arranged alternately, simple ovate with an acuminate tip, 8–16 cm long, and with a serrated margin. If a leaf is torn across, strands of latex exuded from the leaf veins solidify into rubber and hold the two parts of the leaf together. It flowers from March to May. The flowers are inconspicuous, small and greenish; the fruit, June to November, is a winged samara with one seed, very similar to an elm samara in appearance, 2–3 cm long and 1–2 cm broad.

== Taxonomy ==
E. ulmoides is the sole living species of the genus Eucommia. Eucommia is the only genus of the family Eucommiaceae, and was formerly considered to be a separate order, the Eucommiales. It is also sometimes known as "gutta-percha tree" or "Chinese rubber tree", but is not related to either the true gutta-percha tree of southeastern Asia, nor to the South American rubber tree.

== Distribution ==
This tree is also occasionally planted in botanical gardens and other gardens in Europe, North America and elsewhere, being of interest as the only cold-tolerant (to at least -30 °C) rubber-producing tree. Fossils of other Eucommia species have been found in 10- to 35-million-year-old brown coal deposits in central Europe and widely in North America, indicating that the genus had a much wider range in the past.

== Uses ==
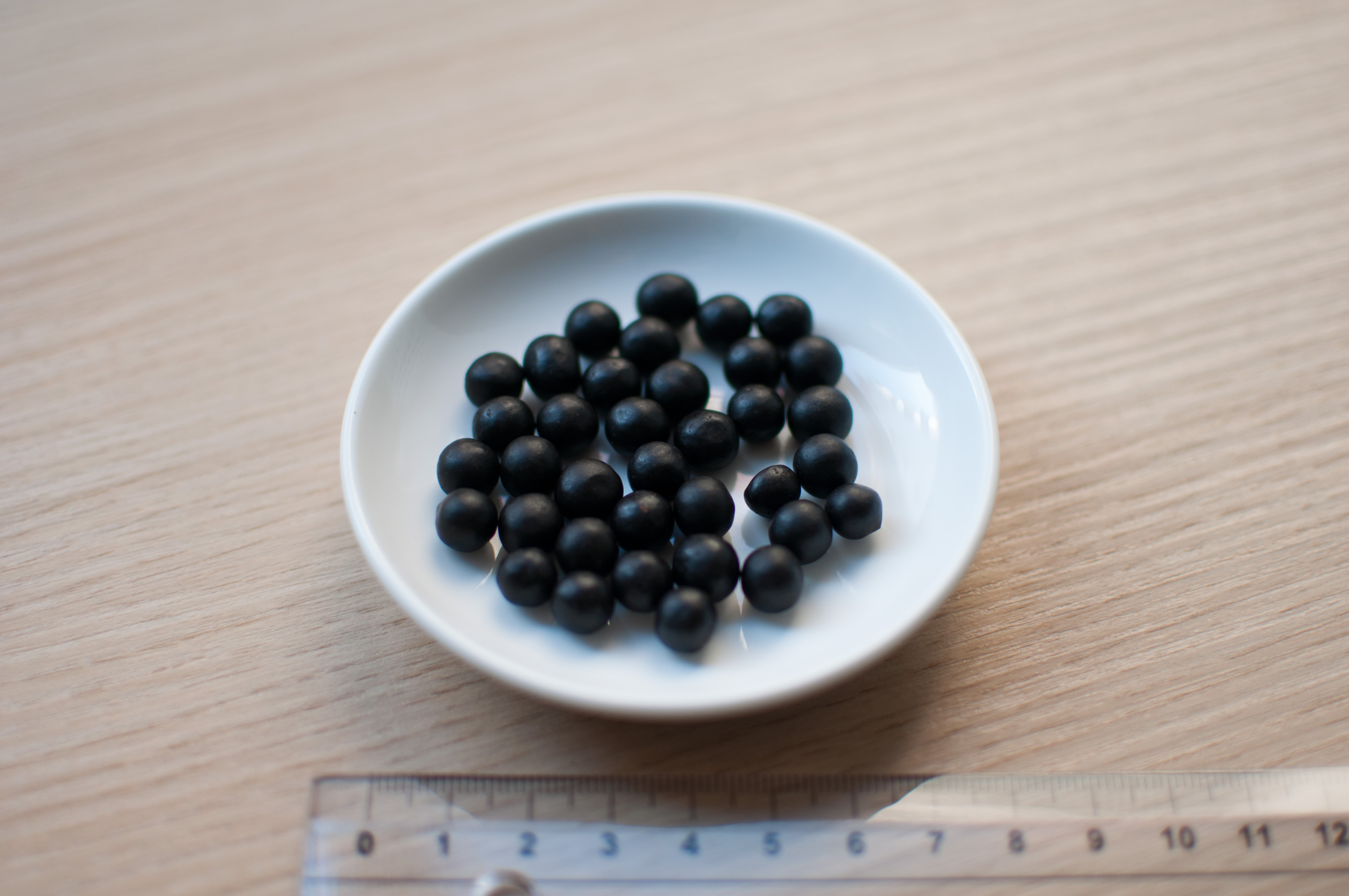
Eucommia ulmoides pastilles, known as dùzhòngwán (Chinese: 杜仲丸)

It is one of the 50 fundamental herbs used in Chinese herbology, where it is called dùzhòng (Chinese: 杜仲). Because of the low production and high demand for natural rubber in China, a unique process has been developed to manufacture elastic materials with Eucommia ulmoides gum (EUG) as substitutes for natural rubber products. Unlike the latex used to produce natural rubber, the EUG is the polymer trans-1,4-polyisoprene. Thus materials made from EUG may demonstrate characteristics other than those of natural rubber, such as higher elasticity, lower thermoplastic temperature, etc.

== Chemistry ==
The iridoid glucoside geniposidic acid can be found in E. ulmoides.

== See also ==
- Chinese herbology 50 fundamental herbs
