= Cynodraco =

Cynodraco Temporal range: Wuchiapingian

Scientific classification
- Domain: Eukaryota
- Kingdom: Animalia
- Phylum: Chordata
- Clade: Synapsida
- Clade: Therapsida
- Clade: †Gorgonopsia
- Genus: †Cynodraco; Owen, 1876

Type species
- Cynodraco serridens Owen, 1876

Other species
- †Cynodraco major Owen, 1876

Genus of therapsids

Cynodraco, (Note: Greek κύων "dog" + δράκων "dragon") also spelled Cynodracon or Cynodrakon, is a dubious genus of non-mammalian therapsid, probably gorgonopsian, from the late Permian of South Africa. Two species of the genus have been named, Cynodraco serridens and Cynodraco major. Its fossils have been found in the Cistecephalus Assemblage Zone, which dates to the Wuchiapingian age of the late Permian. Cynodraco was one of the first gorgonopsian taxa named, alongside Gorgonops and Lycosaurus, which were named in the same publication.

== History of discovery ==
Fossils of Cynodraco were discovered in the Karoo of South Africa by Andrew Geddes Bain, who gave them to the British Museum in 1853. Richard Owen described Cynodraco on the basis of these fossils in 1876 and classified them in two species: Cynodraco serridens and Cynodraco major. In one of his two 1876 papers on the genus, he spells it Cynodraco; in the other, he spells it Cynodracon. Owen found the mammalian characters of the humerus of Cynodraco and the similarity of its teeth to those of the saber-toothed cat Machairodus to be remarkable. Seeley later noted that the humerus could not be proved to belong to the same species as the skull fragments on which the genus is based. In 1890, Richard Lydekker regarded C. serridens as the type species of the genus and synonymized C. major with it. Denise Sigogneau-Russell regarded Cynodraco as a possible gorgonopsian of uncertain affinity, an identification which remains accepted.

== Bibliography ==
- Kammerer, C. F. (2015). "Cranial osteology of Arctognathus curvimola, a short-snouted gorgonopsian from the Late Permian of South Africa". Papers in Palaeontology. 1 (1): 41–58. Bibcode:2015PPal....1...41K. doi:10.1002/spp2.1002. ISSN 2056-2802.
- Lydekker, R. (1890). Catalogue of the fossil Reptilia and Amphibia in the British Museum (Natural History). Part IV. Containing the orders Anomodontia, Ecaudata, Caudata, and Labyrinthodontia; and supplement. London: Taylor and Francis.
- Owen, R. (1876a). Descriptive and illustrated catalogue of the fossil Reptilia of South Africa in the collection of the British Museum. London: Taylor and Francis.
- Owen, R. (1876b). "Evidence of a carnivorous reptile (Cynodraco major, Ow.) about the size of a lion, with remarks thereon". Quarterly Journal of the Geological Society. 32 (1–4): 95–102. doi:10.1144/GSL.JGS.1876.032.01-04.14. S2CID 131211617.
- Seeley, H. G. (1894). "Researches on the structure, organization, and classification of the fossil Reptilia.—Part IX., Section 1. On the Therosuchia". Philosophical Transactions of the Royal Society of London B. 185: 987–1018. JSTOR 91788.
- Sigogneau, D. (1968). "On the classification of the Gorgonopsia". Palaeontologia Africana. 11: 33–46.
- Sigogneau-Russell, D. (1989). Wellnhofer, Peter (ed.). Theriodonta I: Phthinosuchia, Biarmosuchia, Eotitanosuchia, Gorgonopsia. Encyclopedia of Paleoherpetology. New York: Gustav Fischer Verlag. ISBN 0-89574-292-6.
- Smith, R.M.H. (2020-06-01). "Biostratigraphy of the Cistecephalus Assemblage Zone (Beaufort Group, Karoo Supergroup), South Africa". South African Journal of Geology. 123 (2): 181–190. Bibcode:2020SAJG..123..181S. doi:10.25131/sajg.123.0013. eISSN 1996-8590. ISSN 1012-0750.
