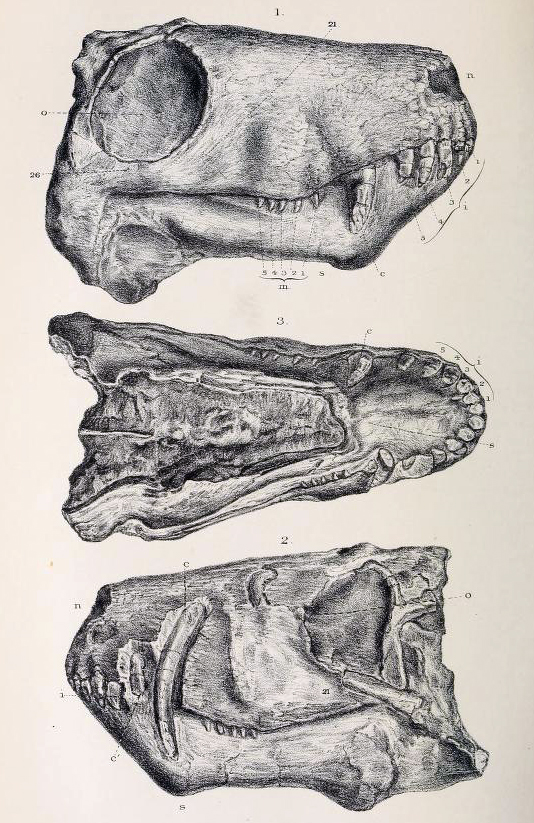
- Holotype skull of A. felinus

Scientific classification
- Kingdom: Animalia
- Phylum: Chordata
- Clade: Synapsida
- Clade: Therapsida
- Clade: †Gorgonopsia
- Genus: †Aelurosaurus; Owen, 1881

Species
- †A. felinus Owen, 1881 (type); †A. whaitsi Broom, 1911; †A. polyodon Broom, 1935 [originally Galerhinus polyodon]; †A. wilmanae Broom, 1940 [originally Aelurosauroides wilmanae]; †A.? watermeyeri Broom, 1940

Synonyms
- Aelurosauroides Boonstra, 1934; Aelurosauropsis Haughton and Brink, 1954; Galerhinus Broom, 1935

= Aelurosaurus =

Aelurosaurus Temporal range: Lopingian (Wuchiapingian) c. 259–256.8 Ma

Extinct genus of therapsids

Aelurosaurus ("cat lizard", from Ancient Greek αἴλουρος "cat" and σαῦρος "lizard") is a small, carnivorous, extinct genus of gorgonopsian therapsids from the Late Permian of South Africa. It was discovered in the Karoo Basin of South Africa, and first named by Richard Owen in 1881. It was named so because it appeared to be an ancestor for cat-like marsupials, but not yet a mammal itself. It contains five species, A. felinus, A. whaitsi, A. polyodon, A. wilmanae, and A.? watermeyeri. A. felinus, the type species, is generally well described with established features, while the other four species are not due to their poorly preserved holotypes.

== Discovery ==
Aelurosaurus was discovered in 1881 in the Karoo Basin of South Africa. The skull holotype was missing the postorbital region, so Owen was left to describe the anterior portion. After examining the sutures and teeth, he assumed the first specimen to be from an older, adult Aelurosaurus, seeing that they were no longer in perfect condition.

== Species ==
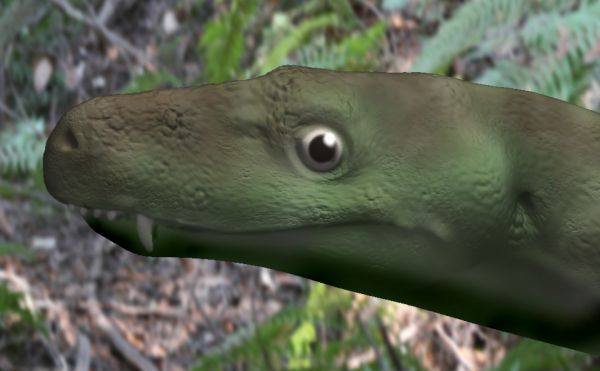
Restoration of A. felinus

=== A. felinus ===
Originally described by Owen, the orbit is a 2.5 centimeters by 2 centimeters ellipse, and the nostril 1.3 centimeters wide and 0.9 centimeters long. The upper jaw has a maximum width of roughly 3.5 centimeters just below the orbits. At a little more than 7.5 centimeters long and 2 centimeters wide, the mandible spans almost the entirety of the skull. This particular specimen was preserved with the mouth closed, with the upper teeth fully covering the mandibular teeth. On the upper jaw, there are five incisors, a gap of 0.8 centimeters, a canine (1.2 centimeters exposed, roughly 3.6 centimeters in total length), another 0.8 centimeter gap, and then five molars. After Owen removed the alveolar wall of the upper maxillary canine, he exposed the mandibular canine, which he found to be the same size as the maxillary. The semicircular canal found on A. felinus and all other gorgonopsians suggests that their heads were ventrally tilted, a characteristic of predators.

While Owen had originally assumed the holotype to be the skull of an adult, it has been argued that it was actually the skull of a juvenile. Owen only attributed its old age to the state of its sutures and teeth, while others noticed features indicating a young age, including its "...short snout, large orbits, slender postcanine teeth, tooth replacement, numerous small postcanine teeth, well developed foramina, large supraorbital portion of the frontal, anteriorly situated preparietal, slender skull arches, narrow vomer, well developed palatal tuberosities, teeth on transverse apophyses, large ectopterygoids, slender mandible, [and] open symphysis".

=== A. whaitsi ===
First described by Robert Broom in 1911. The holotype of A. whaitsi is another skull, but mostly snout, with the main indicator being a flatter symphysis. Its classification went back and forth throughout the entire century since it has very few defining features, all of which could be juvenile features of other genera.

=== A. polyodon ===
First described by Broom in 1935. The holotype of A. polyodon is a crushed snout. Originally named Galerhinus polyodon, it was renamed Aelurosaurus polyodon in 1970.

=== A. wilmanae ===
First described by Broom in 1940. The holotype is a skull that is the best preserved of all the Aelurosaurus species. The defining feature is a larger snout compared to A. felinus, but overall the skull is still small at just eleven centimeters long.

=== A.? watermeyeri ===
First described by Broom in 1940. The holotype is a skull, and was originally named Scylacocephalus watermeyeri. The genus is still under debate, since it shares features with both Aelurosaurus (such as a large orbit and short snout) and Aloposaurus (such as larger preparietal and postfrontal).

== Geology/Paleoenvironment ==
Aelurosaurus felinus was originally obtained in the Gough, of the Karoo Basin of South Africa, which includes the Tapinocephalus and Pristerognathus Assemblage Zones. These assemblage zones are a part of the Beaufort Group and span from the Middle Perimian to the Late Permian. The stratigraphic composition of the Beaufort Group include siltstone, mudstone, and sandstone beds, with evidence of rivers flowing across the land in semi-arid conditions. Findings of dense coprolites consisting of bones suggest that predators lived near these rivers.

While most gorgonopsians have been recovered from the Karoo Basin in South Africa, there have been recent discoveries of gorgonopsians in Russia's Vyazniki Assemblage as well.
