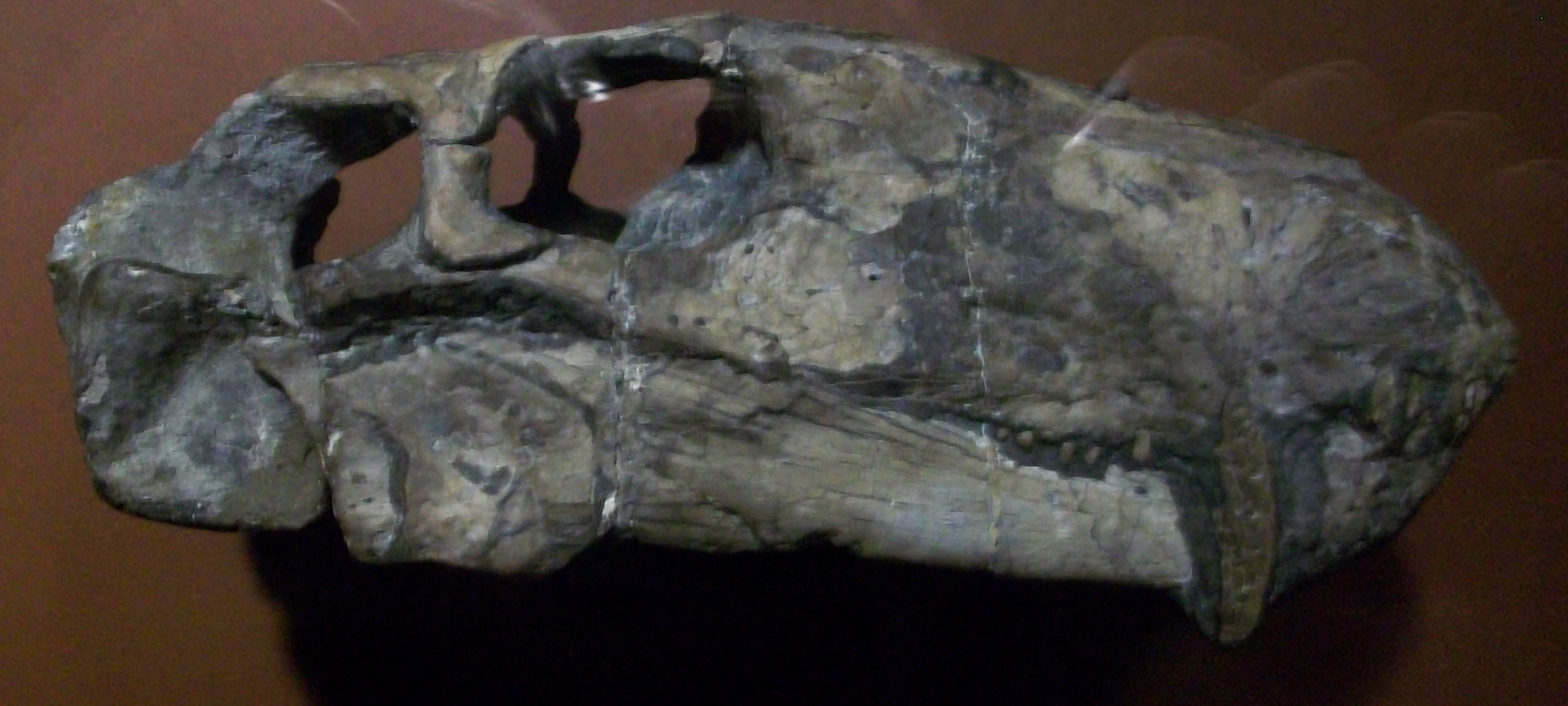
- Holotype skull of C. longiceps (UC 1515) in the Field Museum of Natural History.

Scientific classification
- Kingdom: Animalia
- Phylum: Chordata
- Clade: Synapsida
- Clade: Therapsida
- Clade: †Gorgonopsia
- Genus: †Cyonosaurus; Olson, 1937

Species
- †C. longiceps Olsen, 1937 (type); †C. rubidgei (Broom, 1937 [originally Cyniscops rubidgei]); †C. kitchingi (Broom, 1936 [originally Galerhynchus kitchingi]); †C. broomianus (von Huene, 1950 [originally Cyniscops broomianus]); †C. tenuirostris (Boonstra, 1953 [originally Tangagorgon tenuirostris])

Synonyms
- Cyniscops Broom, 1937; Cyniscopoides Brink and Kitching, 1953; Tangagorgon Boonstra, 1953

= Cyonosaurus =

Cyonosaurus Temporal range: Late Permian (Wuchiapingian to Changhsingian), 256.6–252 Ma

Extinct genus of therapsids

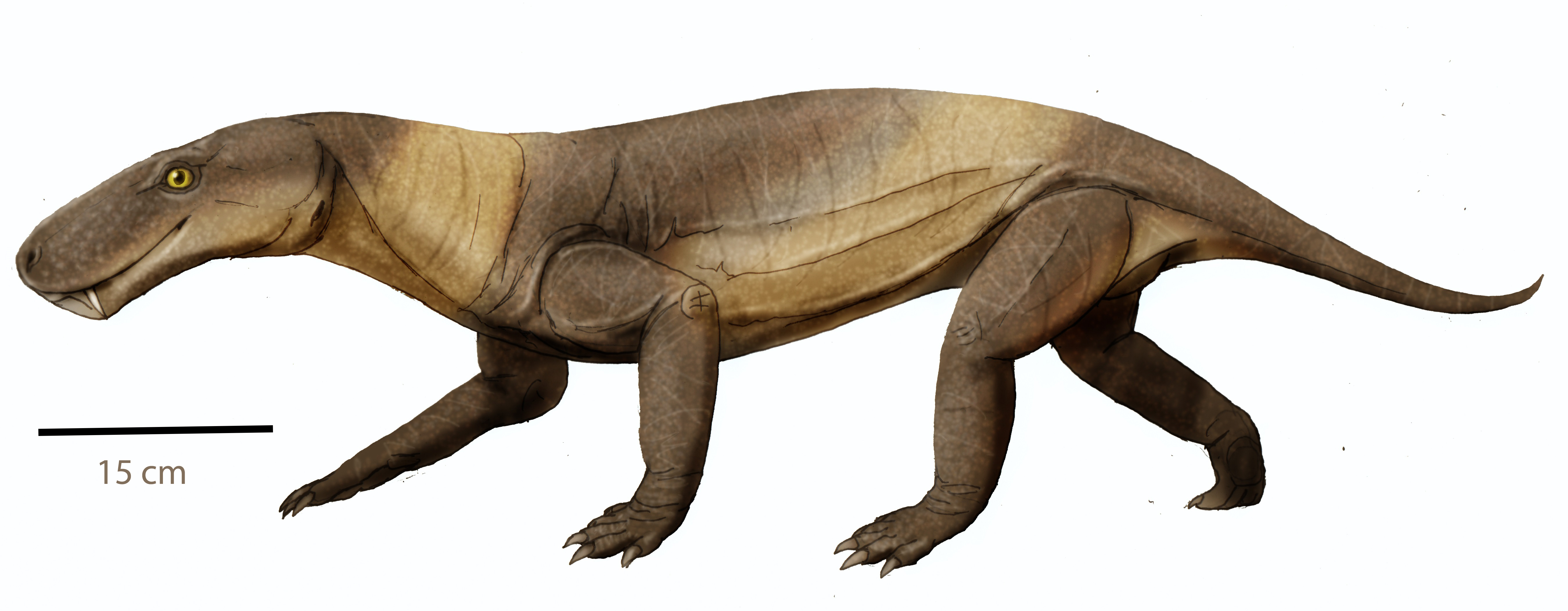
Life restoration of C. longiceps

Cyonosaurus is a genus of gorgonopsian therapsids from the Late Permian of South Africa and Zambia. The type species Cyonosaurus longiceps was named in 1937. Cyonosaurus had a skull length between 9 to 18 centimetres (3 1/2 to 7 in). However, an unnamed species of Cyonosaurus was noted to have a skull length of 20 cm (7.9 in). Originally, some have been reported from Early Triassic strata, but further investigation revealed that these reports were erroneous. Suggesting that Cyonosaurus went extinct during the Permian-Triassic mass extinction.

== See also ==
- List of therapsids
