= Trochorhinus =

Trochorhinus Temporal range: Middle Permian, Capitanian

Scientific classification
- Kingdom: Animalia
- Phylum: Chordata
- Clade: Synapsida
- Clade: Therapsida
- Clade: †Therocephalia
- Family: †Lycosuchidae
- Genus: †Trochorhinus; Broom, 1936 Nomen dubium
- Species: †T. vanhoepeni

Binomial name
- †Trochorhinus vanhoepeni Broom, 1936 Nomen dubium (=Lycosuchidae incertae sedis)

Extinct genus of therapsids from the Permian

Trochorhinus is a dubious genus of therocephalian therapsid from the middle Permian (Capitanian) of South Africa based on a badly weathered and undiagnostic fossil of a lycosuchid therocephalian. It includes the type and only species, T. vanhoepeni, and was named by Scottish-born South African palaeontologist Robert Broom in 1936. Trochorhinus is identifiable as a member of Lycosuchidae by only having five upper incisors in each premaxilla, but the specimen is otherwise too poorly preserved and undiagnostic to determine its affinity beyond this family. As such, Trochorhinus is considered to be a nomen dubium and the only known specimen to represent Lycosuchidae incertae sedis.

Trochorhinus was named for a specimen of a badly weathered lycosuchid snout and an associated lower jaw fragment. Like some other lycosuchids, two similarly sized large simulatenously erupted "double canines" are present in at least the left maxilla, though only the second canine and the root of the first present in the corresponding right maxilla. (Note: "Double canines", i.e. two distinct pairs of simultaneously functional canine teeth, were once thought to be a defining characteristic of lycosuchids. However, it has since been realised that this condition represents the overlapping presence of alternating functional and replacement canines. An alternating pattern of replacement is common amongst predatory therapsids (such as gorgonopsians), though replacement canines co-occur with the functional predecessor much more often in lycosuchids than in other therapsids.) Broom named Trochorhinus as a new genus on the basis of differences in its teeth compared to Trochosaurus, with the five incisors of Trochorhinus measuring only 35 mm compared to 45 mm and 48 mm in Trochosaurus major and T. intermedius, respectively. As the skull comes from a large individual, Broom concluded that this difference could not be attributed to differences in age and growth (ontogeny) and therefore that it represented a distinct genus. He further justified its distinction by identifying only three upper and four lower postcanine teeth in each side of the jaw, one less in each than in Trochosaurus.

The holotype specimen, TM 275, was collected by Dutch-born South African paleontologist Egbert Cornelis Nicolaas van Hoepen from the Abrahamskraal 29 farm in Prince Albert, South Africa, in deposits of the middle-Permian aged Tapinocephalus Assemblage Zone of the Abrahamskraal Formation. Notably, this locality is one of the stratigraphically lowest (and so the oldest) where lycosuchid fossils have been found, making TM 275 (alongside the holotype of Trochosaurus intermedius) one of the oldest recognised lycosuchid specimens known, older than the known lower ranges of both the valid lycosuchids Lycosuchus and Simorhinella. Also, although the specimen is too poorly preserved for measurements of the whole snout or skull to be made or even estimated, the distance between the tip of the snout and the last incisor suggests it comes from an individual on the larger end of the known size range of lycosuchids (comparable in proportions to large specimens referred to another dubious lycosuchid, Scymnosaurus ferox).

== Taxonomy ==
After it was named, Trochorhinus was typically classified under the family Pristerognathidae (an invalid name for what is now recognised as Scylacosauridae), along with other genera typically regarded as lycosuchids. In 1955, Haughton and Brink were the first to group Trochorhinus with other lycosuchids separately from other early therocephalians on the basis of its presumed "double canines", for which they used the name Lycosuchidae (previously coined by Baron Franz Nopcsa in 1923). Alfred Romer did the same in 1956, albeit under the new family name Trochosuchidae (and later as Trochosauridae in 1966). From then on, most researchers consistently allied Trochorhinus with other genera and specimens attributable to lycosuchids as a distinct group—with the family name applied to the group varying between authors—up until 1980 when Juri van den Heever argued that the family was invalid and artificially made up of "pristerognathids" that simply had died in the process of replacing their canines.

Van den Heever revised this position in his unpublished PhD thesis in 1987, however, wherein he revised the taxonomy and systematics of early therocephalians and established the basis of its modern framework. In it, he concluded Lycosuchidae represented a distinct grouping after all (albeit without truly functional "double canines"), and that TM 275 was a lycosuchid due to having only five upper incisors. However, the specimen is so badly preserved that its identification cannot be determined any further below the family level, and so he regarded Trochorhinus as a nomen dubium and TM 275 as representing Lycosuchidae incertae sedis material. This identification has been supported by subsequent authors.
