= Zinnosaurus =

Zinnosaurus Temporal range: Middle Permian, Capitanian, ~260 Ma

Scientific classification
- Kingdom: Animalia
- Phylum: Chordata
- Clade: Synapsida
- Clade: Therapsida
- Clade: †Therocephalia
- Family: †Lycosuchidae
- Genus: †Zinnosaurus; Boonstra, 1968 Nomen dubium
- Species: †Z. paucidens

Binomial name
- †Zinnosaurus paucidens Boonstra, 1964 Nomen dubium (=Lycosuchidae incertae sedis)

Extinct genus of therapsids from the Permian

Zinnosaurus is a dubious genus of therocephalian therapsids from the middle Permian (Capitanian) of South Africa. It includes the type and only species, Z. paucidens, named from a relatively complete skull and partial skeleton of an indeterminate lycosuchid therocephalian from the Karoo Basin by paleontologist Lieuwe Dirk Boonstra in 1964. Although it was described from relatively decent remains compared to other indeterminate lycosuchids, the holotype of Zinnosaurus is otherwise very similar to Lycosuchus (with which it was considered synonymous between 1987 and 2014) and further cannot be reliably distinguished from either it or Simorhinella, the only two definitively valid lycosuchids. As such, the holotype can only be identified as Lycosuchidae incertae sedis and so Zinnosaurus paucidens is a nomen dubium. Although dubious, Zinnosaurus has played an important role in the study of therocephalians by being one of only a relatively small number of specimens to have its postcranial skeleton studied and described in detail.

== History ==
The holotype of Zinnosaurus, SAM-PK-12185, was discovered in the Beaufort West Municipality on the Meyers Poort Farm 326 by Lieuwe Dirk Boonstra and Humphrey Zinn in 1959. This farm exposes rocks from the boundary between the Abrahamskraal Formation and the overlying Teekloof Formation, and so the corresponding uppermost Tapinocephalus Assemblage Zone (AZ) and lowest Endothiodon AZ. The age of this boundary has been dated to approximately 260 million years ago. Unfortunately, the fossil assemblage at Meyers Poort is not distinctive enough to distinguish which of the two assemblage zones they originated from. In addition to Zinnosaurus, it includes indeterminate therocephalian, gorgonopsian, dicynodont remains, a proburnettiine burnetiid, rhinesuchid temnospondyls, and the enigmatic reptile Eunotosaurus. However, the Teekloof Formation is only present at high ground at this locality and is less well exposed, so SAM-PK-12185 and other fossils are more likely come from the Abrahamskraal Formation and so near the top of the Tapinocephalus AZ (i.e. within the Diictodon-Styracocephalus subzone). Such a biostratigraphic position was favoured by Boonstra himself in 1964.

Boonstra named Zinnosaurus in 1964 after his colleague and technical assistant Humphrey Zinn, who accompanied him on many trips to collect fossils in the Tapinocephalus Assemblage Zone. The species name is from the Latin "paucidens", which translates as "few teeth", a feature Boonstra often highlighted when diagnosing the genus and species. Indeed, in his diagnoses of the genus he would characterise the non-canine teeth as "weak" and "well-spaced", and in 1969 he even described the postcanines as "feeble". However, van den Heever contradicted this assessment in 1987, regarding the five incisors in each premaxilla as closely packed and separated from the canine. Van den Heever noted that the fourth incisor, usually the largest incisor in lycosuchids, was in the process of replacement, which may have influenced Boonstra's view of them.

=== Taxonomy ===
When Boonstra first described Zinnosaurus in 1964, he assigned it to the family Pristerognathidae (an invalid name for what is now recognised as Scylacosauridae), rather than to Lycosuchidae, and thought it to be most closely related to Glanosuchus. In two 1968 and 1969 papers overviewing the Tapinocephalus AZ fauna, he would further specifically assign Zinnosaurus to one of two pristerognathid subfamilies, the Scymnosaurinae (itself named after another dubious genus based mostly on lycosuchid material, Scymnosaurus). This classification and division was echoed by James Kitching in 1977.

In 1987, Juri van den Heever completed his PhD thesis revising the taxonomy and systematics of early therocephalians. Therein, van den Heever recognised the lycosuchid affinities of Zinnosaurus, but also synonymised Zinnosaurus paucidens with Lycosuchus vanderrieti due to their close physical similarity. He especially highlighted a flange along the bottom of the maxilla in both taxa, which he regarded as a unique trait specific to L. vanderrieti, distinguishing it from another species of Lycosuchus proposed in his thesis. (Note: This species, "Lycosuchus keyseri", was never formally published and van den Heever later regarded the specimen as an indeterminate lycosuchid.) However, in 2014 a mature specimen of the therocephalian Simorhinella was described by Fernando Abadala and colleagues, and was identified as another lycosuchid. Abdala and colleagues found Simorhinella and Lycosuchus to be very similar and are mostly told apart by characteristics of the palate. Such features are not discernible in SAM-PK-12185, and so it can no longer be confidently assigned to (or told apart from) either Lycosuchus or Simorhinella. As such, SAM-PK-12185 is now considered to be Lycosuchidae incertae sedis and Zinnosaurus paucidens a nomen dubium, representing an indeterminate lycosuchid.

== Description ==
The holotype of Zinnosaurus comprises a relatively complete skull (albeit partially distorted by shear) and partial mandibles with several bones from the limbs and girdles, including a partial scapula and coracoid from the shoulder, a complete right and partial left humeri from the upper arms, and both ends of the femur from the right hind leg (proximal portions of both the ulna and radius with a distal radius of the forearm are mentioned by Boonstra (1964), but not described). The holotype of Zinnosaurus is relatively small for a lycosuchid, with its skull measuring 223 millimetres (8.8 in) in length (compared to close to 30 centimetres (12 in) and above in larger lycosuchids, such as Simorhinella and the largest Lycosuchus) with 102 millimetres (4.0 in) of that being the snout.

Unlike some other specimens of lycosuchids, the fossil of Zinnosaurus lacks the "double canines" once thought to be characteristic of the group, although this trait is now recognised to be an artefact of tooth replacement. (Note: "Double canines", i.e. two distinct pairs of simultaneously functional canine teeth, were once thought to be a defining characteristic of lycosuchids. However, it has since been realised that this condition represents the overlapping presence of alternating functional and replacement canines. An alternating pattern of replacement is common amongst predatory therapsids (such as gorgonopsians), though replacement canines co-occur with the functional predecessor much more often in lycosuchids than in other therapsids.) The skull is otherwise typical of lycosuchids, including only five upper incisors, a relatively wide skull and snout, a deep suborbital bar (the bridge of bone below the eyes), and palatal teeth on the transverse process of the pterygoid but none on the pterygoid boss. The postcanine teeth are set in a discrete thin "lappet" or "flange" of bone along the bottom margin of the maxilla, similar to Lycosuchus. However, in SAM-PK-12815 this flange is continuous with the rest of the surface of the snout, while in definitive specimens of Lycosuchus and other lycosuchids with such a flange (e.g. the holotype of the dubious Hyaenasuchus) it is more inset and divided from the snout by a prominent ridge. Similarly, the surface texture of the flange is the same as the rest of the snout, whereas in Lycosuchus and other lycosuchid specimens it is smoother.

While the skull is largely indistinguishable from other lycosuchids, the postcranial material of Zinnosaurus is more informative to lycosuchid anatomy. The scapula is comparable to that of Simorhinella, sharing the large protuberance above the glenoid (shoulder joint) for the scapular attachment of the triceps muscle. The glenoid itself is well defined and faces largely outwards. The scapula also has an unusually well developed surface for the cleithrum for early therocephalians. The humerus is short with a relatively thick shaft and broadly expanded ends, including a large deltopectoral crest. Indeed, the two epicondyles just above the elbow joint are much more massive in Zinnosaurus than those of scylacosaurids. Particularly, the posterior (when viewed from above) condyle (entepicondyle) forms an expansive sheet of bone that Boonstra wrote as indicating well developed flexor muscles of the forearm. The head of the femur is rounded and oval shaped, with a thick internal trochanter.
