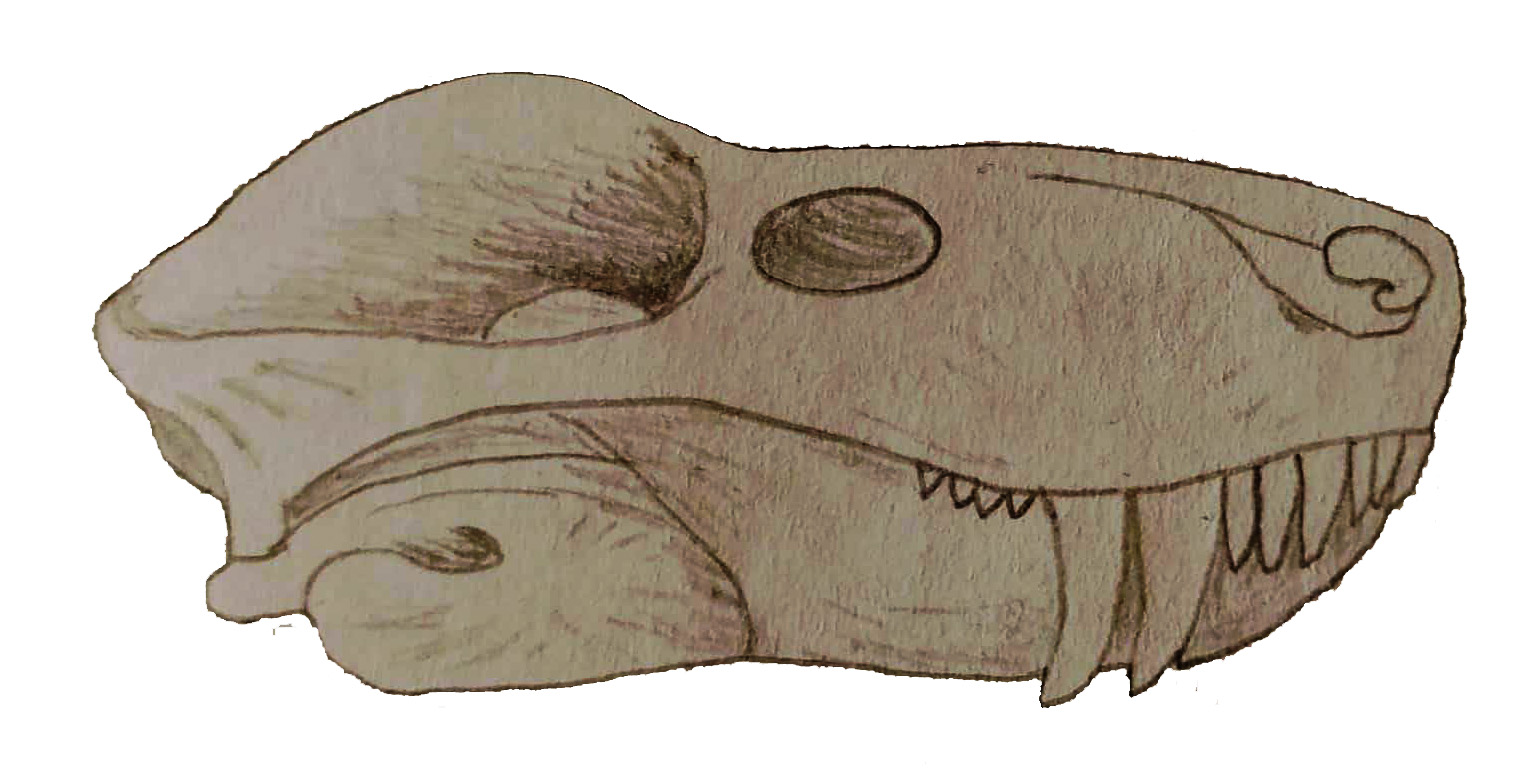
- Interpretive illustration of the skull of Hyaenasuchus, SAM-PK-1079, drawn after Broom (1932)

Scientific classification
- Kingdom: Animalia
- Phylum: Chordata
- Clade: Synapsida
- Clade: Therapsida
- Clade: †Therocephalia
- Family: †Lycosuchidae
- Genus: †Hyaenasuchus; Broom, 1908 Nomen dubium
- Species: †H. whaitsi

Binomial name
- †Hyaenasuchus whaitsi Broom, 1908 Nomen dubium (=Lycosuchidae incertae sedis)

= Hyaenasuchus =

Hyaenasuchus Temporal range: Middle Permian, Capitanian

Extinct genus of therapsids from the Permian

Hyaenasuchus is a dubious genus of therocephalian therapsids from the middle Permian (Capitanian) of South Africa. It includes the type and only species, H. whaitsi, named by Scottish-born South African palaeontologist Robert Broom in 1908 from a single weathered but largely complete skull and lower jaws of an indeterminate lycosuchid therocephalian from the Karoo Basin. The skull is very similar to that of Lycosuchus, and Broom distinguished them only on the basis of different tooth counts. Hyaenasuchus was informally synonymised with Lycosuchus in 1987, and this proposal was upheld in subsequent literature up until 2014 following the re-identification of Simorhinella as another lycosuchid. The holotype of Hyaenasuchus cannot be reliably distinguished from either Lycosuchus or Simorhinella and so cannot be confidently synonymised with either one. As such the sole specimen is now identified as Lycosuchidae incertae sedis, and the name Hyaenasuchus is regarded as a nomen dubium.

== History of study ==
The holotype specimen, SAM-PK-1079, was collected by the Reverend J. H. Whaits on the farm Rietfontein 56 in Prince Albert, South Africa, from deposits belonging to the middle-Permian (Capitanian) aged Tapinocephalus Assemblage Zone in exposures the Abrahamskraal Formation. Although largely complete, the specimen is badly weathered, with portions of the top of the front and snout missing, and is encased in a very hard rock matrix that makes further preparation difficult.

Broom diagnosed Hyaenasuchus as a new species for having six upper incisors in each premaxilla, two pairs of functional upper canines (so called "double canines"), (Note: "Double canines", i.e. two distinct pairs of simultaneously functional canine teeth, were once thought to be a defining characteristic of lycosuchids. However, it has since been realised that this condition represents the overlapping presence of alternating functional and replacement canines. An alternating pattern of replacement is common amongst predatory therapsids (such as gorgonopsians), though replacement canines co-occur with the functional predecessor much more often in lycosuchids than in other therapsids.) and four postcanines in each maxilla. This was in contrast to Lycosuchus, with five upper incisors and only one or two postcanines. Notably, this was the first time Broom identified the two pairs of canines as being simultaneously functional in a lycosuchid, after initially believing one set to be a replacement pair in Lycosuchus.

In 1987, palaeontologist Juri van den Heever re-interpreted the dentition of Hyaenasuchus (and so their diagnostic validity) in his unpublished PhD thesis on early therocephalian systematics. He noted there is an inconsistent number of incisors in each premaxilla, with only five in the better preserved right premaxilla that occupy the entire toothrow, while six as described by Broom are only suggested in the more damaged left premaxilla. Further, although Broom believed Hyaenasuchus to have two pairs of simultaneously functional upper canines, only one on each side is definitively fully erupted, with the first canine on the right being broken at the root while the second canine on the left side is not fully grown. Van den Heever interpreted this pattern instead as recording the alternating position of the functional canine and its replacement (as seen in other lycosuchids), with the rear canine having functionally replaced the first on the right side and the left rear canine growing in ready to replace the older first canine. Finally, he also identified up to three postcanines in the holotype of Lycosuchus, but also dismissed postcanine count as a useful diagnostic tool due to their potential variability relating to body size and growth of the canines.

== Description ==
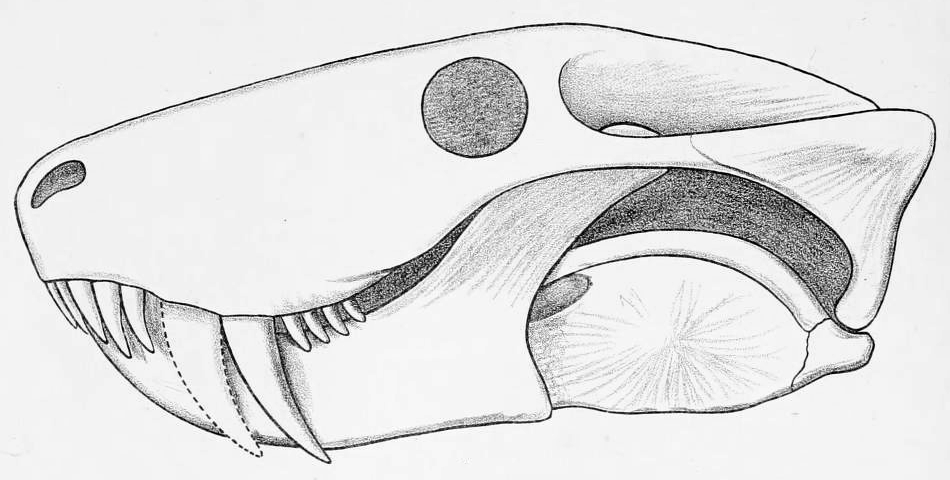
Broom's original interpretation of the skull of Hyaenasuchus (SAM-PK-1079) drawn in 1908.

Apart from the teeth, the skull of Hyaenasuchus as preserved is otherwise identical to Lycosuchus in general structure. Among the features that identify it as a lycosuchid are a deep suborbital bar (the bridge of bone beneath the eye sockets) and palatal teeth on the transverse processes of the pterygoid bones. A notable feature shared with Lycosuchus is a thin flange of bone projecting from the bottom of the maxilla that houses the postcanines with a prominent horizontal ridge of bone above it (although the ridge is not as strongly developed as it is in the holotype of Lycosuchus). SAM-PK-1079 is a reasonably large lycosuchid, with a skull measuring 296 millimetres (11.7 in) long, of which 130 millimetres (5.1 in) is the snout.

In his initial 1908 reconstruction, Broom illustrated Hyaenasuchus with a low intertemporal bar without a raised sagittal crest sloping down from behind the eyes to the occiput. He revised his reconstruction in 1932 when redescribing Hyaenasuchus (and other lycosuchids) in his book The Mammal-like Reptiles of South Africa and the origin of mammals, reconstructing the skull with a more elevated sagittal crest as in other lycosuchids.

== Taxonomy ==
Some confusion surrounded the taxonomy of Hyaenasuchus during the 20th century, as its name was often misspelt by various authors as "Hyaenosuchus". This misspelling was first introduced as early as the 1911 edition of German palaeontologist Karl Alfred von Zittel's book Grundzüge der Paläontologie, and the mistake was later repeated by Watson in 1917 and 1921, and Broili in 1923. The mistake was most notably made by Broom himself in 1932 in his monograph The mammal-like reptiles of South Africa and the origin of mammals. This error was then subsequently propagated in many later publications by several other authors as late as into the 1960s, including the fossil catalogues of Kuhn in 1937 and 1965, von Huene in 1938 and 1956, Romer in 1945 and 1956, Boonstra in 1963 and Vjuschkov in 1964. Many of these errors were made in taxonomic lists and faunal reviews of early therocephalians and the Tapinocephalus Assemblage Zone, respectively. Von Huene made a further mistake in 1956 when, in addition to using the spelling "Hyaenosuchus", he also mislabelled an image of the whaitsiid therocephalian Hyenosaurus (a junior synonym of Theriognathus) as "Hyaenosuchus".

Regardless of spelling, Hyaenasuchus was consistently recognised as closely allied to Lycosuchus. In 1908, Broom proposed a non-cladistic phylogeny of early therocephalians, in which he recognised a lineage of "double canined" forms (i.e. Lycosuchidae). Broom based his early therocephalian relationships on tooth count, believing they started with many teeth and gradually reducing them in several lineages. Consequently, Hyaenasuchus was regarded as the most primitive member of the "double-canined" lineage, followed by the loss of one pair of incisors in Trochosuchus and finally the supposed reduction of the postcanines in Lycosuchus. The taxonomy of this group has its own complicated history, with multiple equivalent names introduced during the 20th century (e.g. Lycosuchidae, Trochosuchidae, Trochosauridae), but regardless Hyaenasuchus was consistently recognised as a core member of the family.

In his 1987 PhD thesis, van den Heever synonymised Hyaenasuchus with Lycosuchus due to their similar anatomy, especially as he regarded the ventral maxillary flange and associated ridge as specifically diagnostic of L. vanderietti. This synonymy was complicated in 2014 by the discovery of a new specimen of Simorhinella and the recognition that it was a lycosuchid. Simorhinella and Lycosuchus are also very similar, but they are distinguishable by features of the palate. The palate of SAM-PK-1079 is almost entirely inaccessible due to the hard matrix surrounding the fossil, and portions of the palate are only visible at a pair of breaks that cut across the skull—one between the pterygoids and one across the canine region of the snout. As such, SAM-PK-1079 cannot be reliably identified as either a specimen of Lycosuchus or Simorhinella, or differentiated from both, and so the specimen only represents Lycosuchidae incertae sedis and consequently Hyaenasuchus is rendered a nomen dubium.
