= Trochosuchus =

Trochosuchus Temporal range: Middle Permian, Capitanian

Scientific classification
- Kingdom: Animalia
- Phylum: Chordata
- Clade: Synapsida
- Clade: Therapsida
- Clade: †Therocephalia
- Family: †Lycosuchidae
- Genus: †Trochosuchus; Broom, 1908 Nomen dubium
- Species: †T. acutus

Binomial name
- †Trochosuchus acutus Broom, 1908 Nomen dubium (=Lycosuchidae incertae sedis)

Extinct genus of therapsids from the Permian

Trochosuchus is a dubious genus of therocephalian therapsid from the middle Permian (Capitanian) of South Africa based on a weathered and poorly preserved undiagnostic fossil of a lycosuchid therocephalian. It includes the type and only species, T. acutus. Trochosuchus was named by palaeontologist Robert Broom in 1908 based on its supposedly unique proportions of the simulatenous 'double' functional canines thought to be characteristic of lycosuchids, with the pair in front being noticeably smaller than the second pair behind (compared to roughly equally sized in Lycosuchus).

However, later studies have shown that the 'double canines' of lycosuchids represent overlap of alternating functional and replacement canines and not distinct tooth positions. (Note: The same alternating canine replacement pattern occurs in other predatory therapsids, including other therocephalians and gorgonopsians. However, in those forms the replacement grows in after the older worn canine has already fallen out, with only one canine erupted at a time. In lycosuchids, the old canine remains in the jaw as its alternate grows in, and falls out after its own direct replacement is already growing.) As such, the variation in size between the front and back canines reflects stages of growth and replacement rather than specific differences. Trochosuchus therefore cannot be distinguished from other lycosuchids (i.e. Lycosuchus and Simorhinella) by its canines alone, and consequently the genus is now regarded by researchers as a nomen dubium (dubious name) based on Lycosuchidae incertae sedis.

The holotype specimen, SAM-PK-1076, was collected by the Reverend J. H. Whaits at the Rietfontein 56 farm in Prince Albert, South Africa, from deposits of the middle-Permian aged Tapinocephalus Assemblage Zone. It consists of the snout and lower jaws of small, possibly juvenile lycosuchid preserved up the orbits with a preserved snout length of 101 millimetres (4.0 in) that has been partially compressed top-to-bottom. Like other lycosuchids, the snout is low and relatively broad with five incisors in each premaxilla (traits diagnostic of the group) with the characteristic 'double canines' on each side, though the smaller first canine is only about as large as the incisors. Although undiagnostic beyond Lycosuchidae, SAM-PK-1076 is notable amongst lycosuchids as it appears to have the roots of small palatal teeth on the boss of the pterygoid bone, which are absent in other lycosuchid specimens.

In 1936, Broom tentatively referred a second therocephalian specimen collected at the same locality as the holotype to Trochosuchus. However, the specimen only preserved the weathered back third of the skull, lacking the snout, and so cannot be compared with the holotype and is only discernible as a moderately large early therocephalian.

== Taxonomy ==
Although it is a nomen dubium, Trochosuchus has a convoluted taxonomic history, largely due to the instability of early therocephalian systematics during the 20th century. Trochosuchus was originally allied with other lycosuchids, typically either as their own family (i.e. Lycosuchidae) or subsumed together into what is now recognised as Scylacosauridae (such as by Haughton (1924), Boonstra (1934) and Romer (1945)). However, Trochosuchus was also sometimes split away entirely from lycosuchids into other families, namely the Akidnognathidae by Haughton and Brink (1955) (i.e. allied to Akidnognathus and Moschorhinus) and Alopecodontidae by Romer (1966) and Kitching (1977) (an invalid family today otherwise composed of scylacosaurids). Such referrals were largely based on the size, identification and arrangement of its canines and other teeth. Tatarinov (1974) also separated Trochosuchus from lycosuchids under another taxonomic scheme, but notably retained it with other "primitive" therocephalians under Scylacosauridae in one therocephalian suborder while other lycosuchids were grouped with the "advanced" therocephalians in a different suborder, Whaitsioidea.

Trochosuchus was also notably used as the name-bearer of the lycosuchid group for a time by some researchers, with Romer (1956), Watson and Romer (1956), Lehman (1961), Camp and Allison (1961), Kuhn (1961), Camp, Allison and Nichols (1964), Camp et al. (1968), and Camp et al. (1972) using the name "Trochosuchidae" for this family over Lycosuchidae, despite the latter having priority.

In an unpublished PhD thesis from 1987, Juri van den Heever revised the taxonomy and systematics of early therocephalians, establishing the basis of its modern framework. Van den Heever concluded that SAM-PK-1076 was indeed recognisable as a lycosuchid, but that it lacks any further diagnostic features due to its poor preservation and nullification of canine size as a diagnostic trait. As such, he considered the specimen to be Lycosuchidae incertae sedis and therefore that Trochosuchus acutus is a nomen dubium. This view has been upheld by later researchers of lycosuchid taxonomy.

Broom also named a second species of Trochosuchus in 1915, T. major. However, in 1932 he instead referred this species to a different genus also named in 1915, Trochosaurus, synonymising it with its type species (T. intermedius) as the new combination Trochosaurus major. Broom was admittedly uncertain whether the two could be distinguished, and indeed Romer (1956) and Romer & Watson (1956) considered the two to be synonymous with Trochosuchus as the senior synonym. However, like Trochosuchus, Trochosaurus is dubious and based on fossils undiagnostic beyond Lycosuchidae (including T. major) representing Lycosuchidae incertae sedis.
