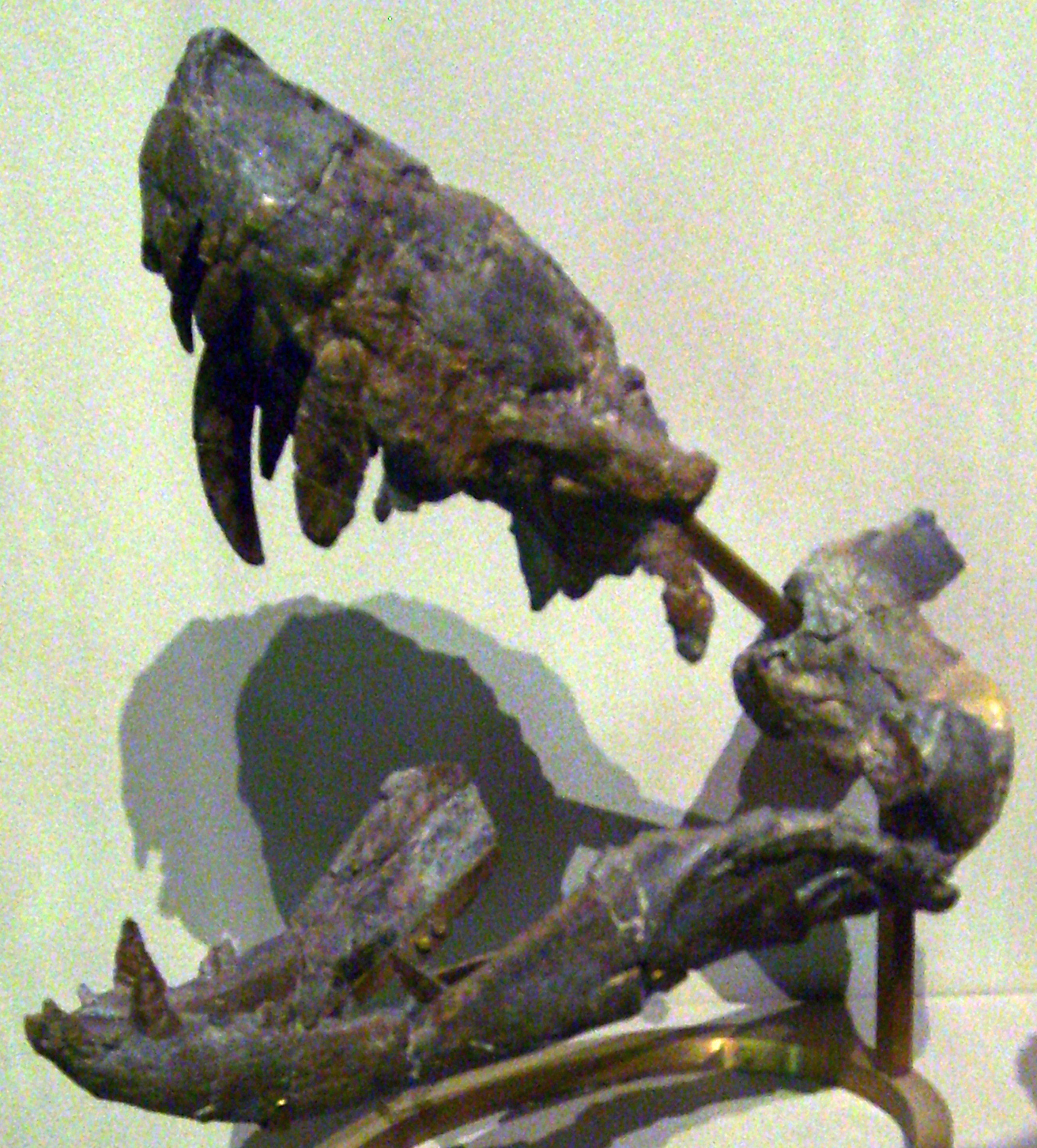
- Partial skull of Lycosuchus in the Museum für Naturkunde, highlighting its large canines

Scientific classification
- Kingdom: Animalia
- Phylum: Chordata
- Clade: Synapsida
- Clade: Therapsida
- Clade: †Therocephalia
- Family: †Lycosuchidae; Nopcsa, 1923

Valid genera
- †Lycosuchus †Simorhinella

Synonyms
- †Trochosuchidae Romer, 1956; †Trochosauridae Romer, 1966

= Lycosuchidae =

Lycosuchids Temporal range: Middle to Late Permian (Capitanian-Wuchiapingian), ~265–258 Ma Suspected Roadian origin

Extinct family of therapsids

Lycosuchidae is a family of therocephalians (an extinct clade of therapsids, broader group which modern mammals belong to) known from fossils from what is now the Beaufort Group of South Africa and that lived during the Middle to Late Permian between roughly 265 to 258 million years ago. It currently includes only two genera each with a single species, Lycosuchus, represented by L. vanderrieti, and Simorhinella, represented by S. baini, both named by paleontologist Robert Broom in 1903 and 1915, respectively (though Simorhinella was not recognised as a lycosuchid until 2014). Both species are large predators characterised by their size, reduced tooth counts with large, almost "sabre toothed" canine teeth, and relatively short, broad and low snouts.

Lycosuchids were once thought to be defined by having two simultaneously functional pairs of canines, so-called "double canines", instead of a single pair of like in all other predatory therapsids (including predatory mammals). However, it has since been recognised that these actually represent overlap between an older pair and their alternated replacements in separate tooth sockets, and that fossils of lycosuchids with "double canines" in fact preserve teeth at different stages of growth and replacement. This is the same method of canine replacement used by other predatory therapsids, though the pattern appears to be unusual in lycosuchids as the alternating canines occur together more often compared to other predatory therapsids like other therocephalians and gorgonopsians.

Lycosuchids are among the earliest known therocephalians and are also thought to be the most basal. The Russian genus Gorynychus, containing two species, has been suggested by some experts to be a member of the family. However, other experts classify it outside of the family and closer to eutherocephalians. Lycosuchids are only known from the Tapinocephalus and lower Endothiodon Assemblage Zones of the Karoo Basin, surviving the Capitanian mass extinction event between them that wiped out many other therapsid groups and ended the Middle Permian, but apparently only persisting as a "dead clade walking" that went extinct as ecosystems fully recovered, potentially competing with recently evolved large gorgonopsians.

== Morphology and biology ==
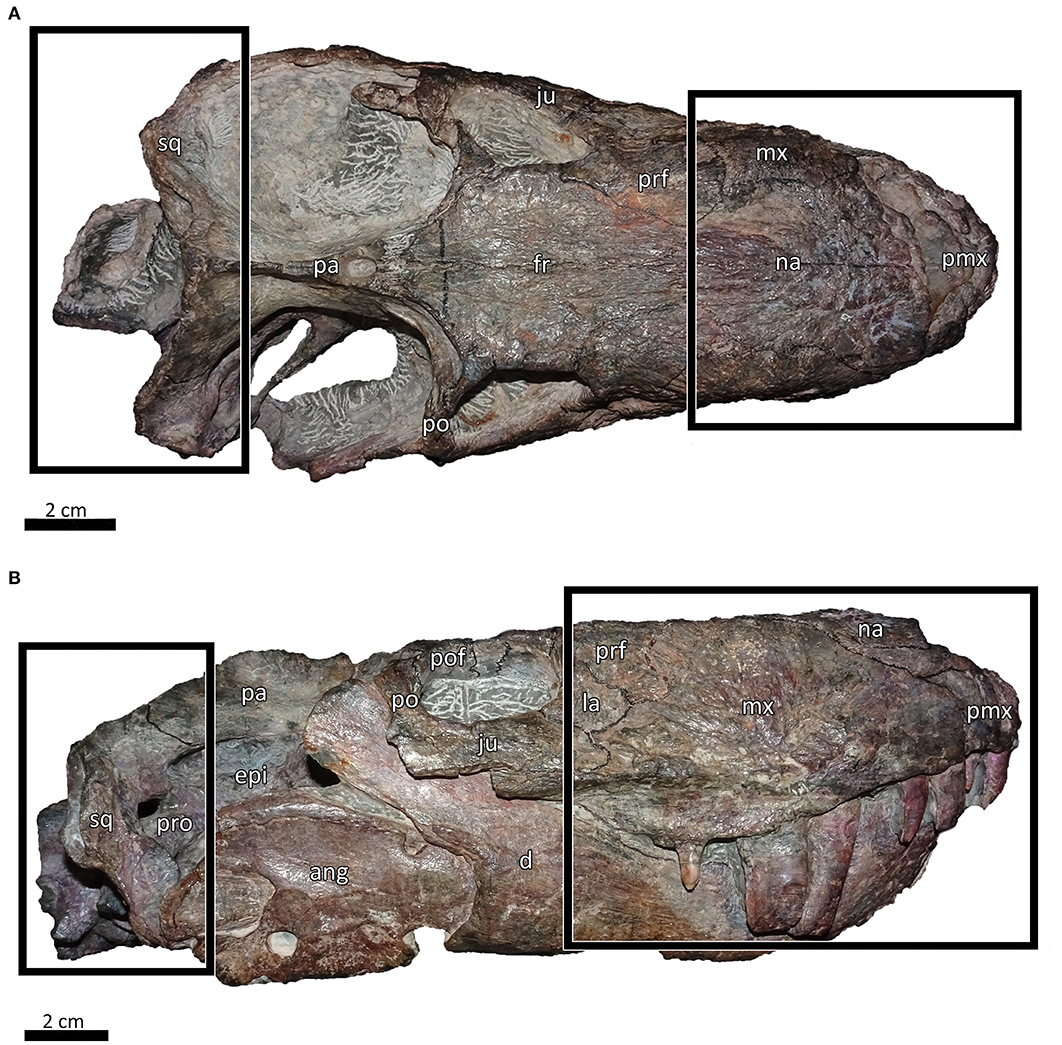
Near complete and undistorted skull of Lycosuchus from above and the side, illustrating lycosuchid proportions

Lycosuchids are characterised by several physical features of their skulls, including a low and wide snout that is proportionately short, typically half or less of the skull's whole length. The number of teeth are also distinctive, as lycosuchids only ever possess five or less incisors on each side of the upper jaw, a pair of canines, and very few postcanines behind them, typically only two or three behind each. In the lower jaws, there are only three incisors, a canine, and around five postcanines in each mandible.

While lycosuchids have shorter, wider and more robustly built snouts than early therocephalians in the family Scylacosauridae, they are nonetheless broadly similar to them, and in some ways also superficially resemble gorgonopsians. The large, almost "sabre-tooth" like canines are especially striking similarities. This anatomy suggests lycosuchids were capable of relatively strong bites with their large canines and incisors, and were resistant to the twisting of prey in their powerful jaws. All lycosuchids, including dubious genera and indeterminate specimens, are very similar superficially and share all of these features with little variation. The only accepted valid genera, Lycosuchus and Simorhinella, are mostly told apart by details of palate and the jaw joint.

Lycosuchids are large therocephalians, with the largest known Lycosuchus skull measuring almost 30 cm (12 in) long and the even larger skull of Simorhinella measuring 37 cm (15 in) long. The largest lycosuchid is an indeterminate specimen previously named as the holotype of "Scymnosaurus major" labelled SAM-PK-9005. It is a poorly preserved and incomplete snout measuring 22.6 cm (8.9 in) long, but proportionately it exceeds the snout dimensions of Simorhinella (which measures 18.2 cm (7.2 in) long). SAM-PK-9005 is both the largest known lycosuchid and also one of the largest therocephalians known altogether.

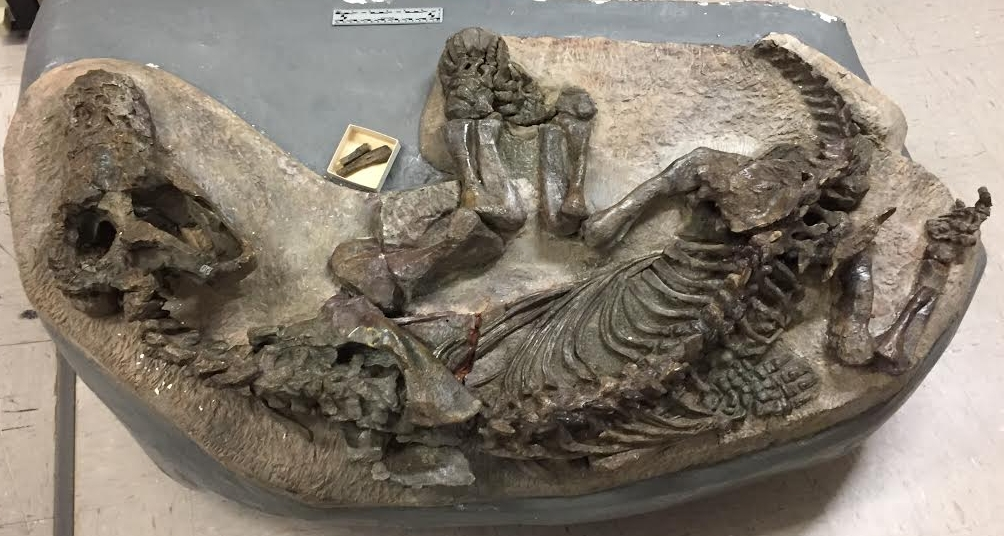
UCMP 42667, a complete skeleton of a lycosuchid.

Little is known about the postcranial skeleton of lycosuchids, and there is little overlap in the available material to make broad statements about their anatomy. Nonetheless, two scapulae (shoulder blades) from different specimens both have a distinctive bony protuberance above the glenoid (shoulder joint), thought to be an enlarged attachment for the part of the triceps muscle. The ulna, known in both Simorhinella and SAM-PK-9005, is robust with a short olecranon process at the elbow, a feature probably related to their large size. A complete skeleton of a large therocephalian (UCMP 42667) that was previously described as a specimen of "Cynariognathus platyrhinus" (a taxon synonymous with Glanosuchus) in 1967 was alluded by palaeontologist Christian Kammerer to be a lycosuchid in a 2023 paper on scylacosaurid therocephalians, though it has yet to be compared in detail with other lycosuchid remains.

=== "Double Canines" ===
Historically, "double canines" in the upper jaw were regarded as the most defining trait of lycosuchids, and sometimes even the sole trait to distinguish them. Unlike other predatory therapsids (such as gorgonopsians and other therocephalians), which only ever have one functioning pair of upper canines at a time, lycosuchids were thought to have two distinct pairs, each with its own tooth socket (alveolus) one immediately behind the other, that were both simultaneously functional and independently replaced. Notably, these other therapsids also have two positions for each canine and the active tooth alternated between the alveoli every time it was replaced. The distinction made for lycosuchids was that two distinct sets teeth supposedly occupied both positions at the same time, rather than a single pair that alternated between them. This was thought to be a primitive characteristic retained by lycosuchids from earlier sphenacodont (or "pelycosaur") ancestors such as Dimetrodon, which were also thought to have two distinct sets of canines (now also known to be incorrect).

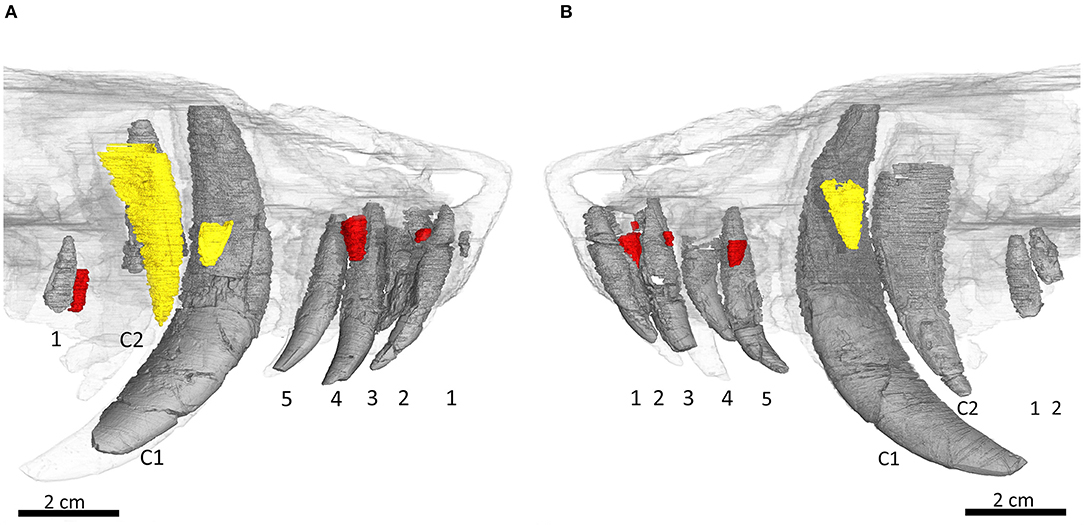
Digital reconstruction of the upper teeth of Lycosuchus and their replacements within the jaw bone (transparent), viewed from the inside. Note the large size of the replacement canine (C2) and the developing direct replacement (yellow) for the first canine (C1) on the right.

It has since been determined that the "double canines" of lycosuchids do in fact represent this same alternating pattern of replacement, as the ages of the canines are always staggered and specimens with only a single erupted pair exist. Nonetheless, the pattern of canine replacement in lycosuchids appears to be unique compared to other predatory therapsids. Although lycosuchids are relatively rare as fossils, over half of the known specimens preserve "double canines". This is much more frequent than other, more common groups of therapsid, and suggests that there was more overlap between the alternating pairs during the lifetime of lycosuchids than in other therapsids.

In 2014 Fernando Abdala and colleagues proposed this could be explained by a more rapid rate of replacement, such that they overlapped more often and that old teeth did not shed until after its replacement had already grown to a similar size. A team led by Luisa Pusch in 2020 proposed an alternate hypothesis based on CT-scans of the jaws of Lycosuchus. They found that in addition to the old canine remaining in place as its replacement developed, its own direct replacement in the same socket was already developing inside the jaw bone. They proposed instead that complete tooth replacement in lycosuchids was protracted, with the older canines remaining set in the jaws long after the alternate pair had erupted and grew to a similar size to the point that their own direct replacements had started to develop before finally being shed.

Though not truly representing two functional pairs of canines as originally thought, the frequency of overlap between the alternating old and replacement canines suggests they were both still functional together, at least to some degree, during the animals' lifetimes. This is unlike other predatory therapsids, where the old and worn canine is shed to be functionally replaced by its alternate. How two concurrent large canines in each upper jaw functioned is not clear, and it has been argued that such "double canines" acting as a single unit would be less efficient at both puncturing and tearing flesh due to their bulk and by obscuring the serrations of the other tooth.

== Taxonomy and classification ==
The concept for a family of "double canined" early therocephalians was first put forward by Broom in 1908, when he proposed that the "double canined" early therocephalians recognised at the time (Lycosuchus, Hyaenasuchus and Trochosuchus) formed a separate evolutionary unit from other early therocephalians, then recognised as the "Pristerognathidae" (now known as Scylacosauridae). Broom would continue to be a proponent for this division, but for many decades he did not attribute a name to such a group, even after Lycosuchidae was already made available. The family Lycosuchidae was first established by Baron Franz Nopcsa in 1923, although the name was often misattributed to other authors by later researchers until the end of the 20th century when his precedent was recognised. Other early uses of the name Lycosuchidae were by Samuel W. Williston and et William King Gregory in their 1925 publication The Osteology of the Reptiles, and a similar concept was used by Sidney H. Haughton and Adrian S. Brink in 1954 catalogue of fossil "reptiles" from the Karoo, though neither of them attributed any authorship to Lycosuchidae.

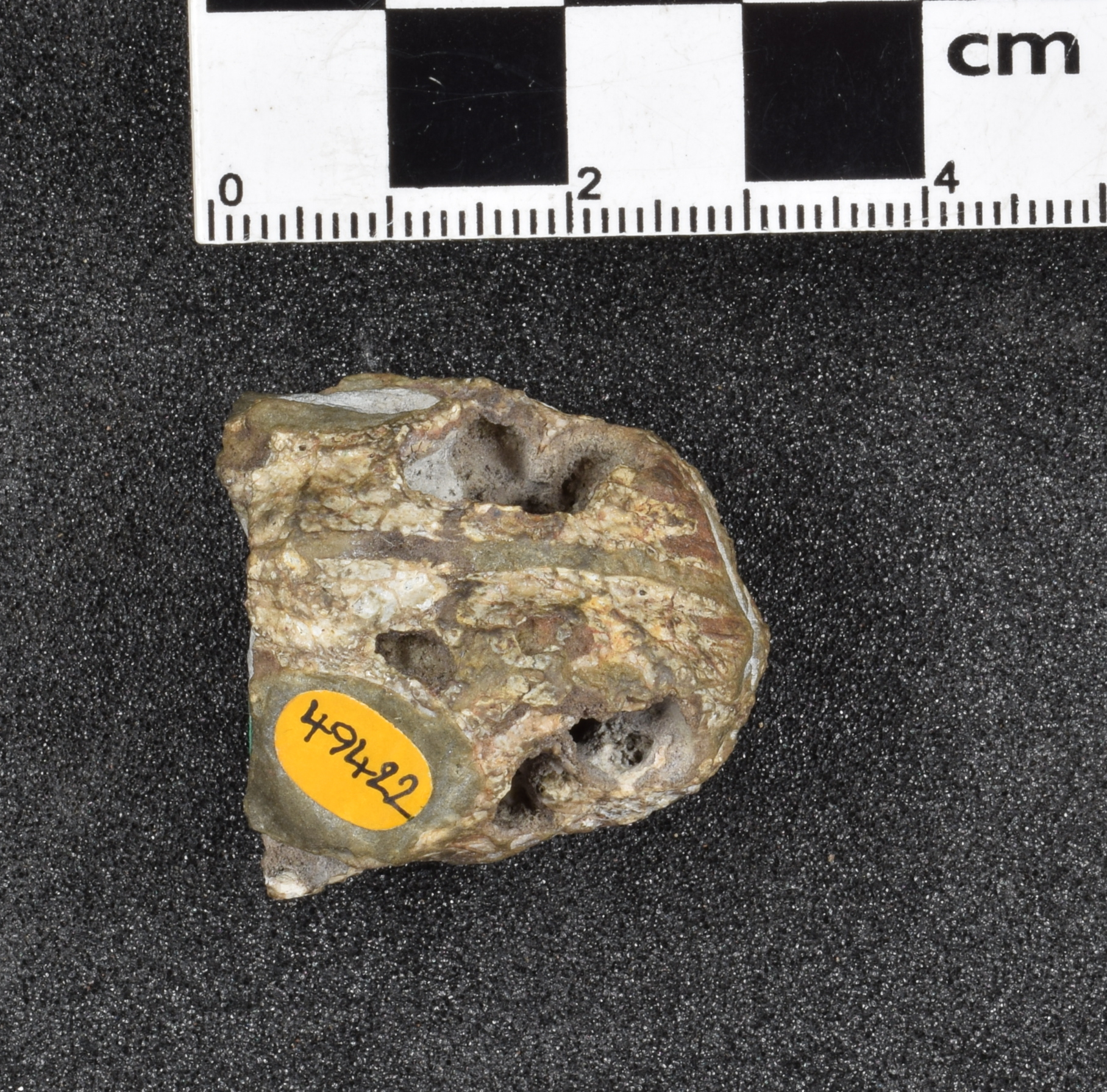
The juvenile holotype of Simorhinella viewed from above (eyes to the left)

The validity of Lycosuchidae was not always supported by researchers, particularly when the "double canines" were the only proposed criterion. This scepticism culminated in a paper by Jurgens van den Heever in 1980, where he argued that lycosuchids were an unnatural, artificial collection of "pristerognathids" that had died during the process of alternating canine replacement typical of predatory therapsids, and argued it should be invalidated. When not recognised as forming their own family, lycosuchid genera were typically subsumed under the family Scylacosauridae, which was more commonly (though incorrectly) identified as Pristerognathidae by most researchers during the 20th century. Van den Heever would later reconsider his view on lycosuchids and recognise them as a distinct lineage after all, establishing the more thorough anatomical criteria for which the family is diagnosed today in his PhD thesis and a subsequent publication. Therein, he also established the taxonomically higher group Lycosuchia (originally "Lycosauria" in his thesis) (Note: Lycosauria already being a disused name introduced by Harry Seeley in 1894 for primitive theriodonts.) containing the family, intended to be the equivalent sister group to Scylacosauria, though this higher taxon has not seen use since then.

Two genera are considered valid today, Lycosuchus and Simorhinella, each with a single species (monospecific). Both genera were named by Robert Broom, a palaeontologist who worked on and named many Karoo fossils, in the early 20th century (1903 and 1915, respectively), but Simorhinella was not actually identified as a lycosuchid until almost a century after its discovery. Lycosuchus is known from five skulls and mandibles of varying completeness, including the nearly complete holotype. Simorhinella was named from the skull of a very young specimen and was initially identified as a "scaloposaurid" (an artificial collection of small therocephalians). It was only recognised as a lycosuchid in 2014 following the discovery of a skull from an adult individual. All accepted lycosuchid fossils come from the Beaufort Group of the Karoo Basin in South Africa from rocks of the Abrahamskraal and Teekloof Formations, corresponding to the upper Tapinocephalus Assemblage Zone (AZ) and lower Endothiodon AZ.

An alternative but functionally identical name for the family, Trochosuchidae, was established by Alfred Romer in 1956, apparently unaware of the pre-existing use of Lycosuchidae by other authors. Romer named the family after Trochosuchus, a now dubious genus of lycosuchid. Curiously, Romer would erect a family for the lycosuchid genera for a second time in 1966, this time as Trochosauridae after the lycosuchid Trochosaurus (also now dubious). Romer likely did this because in 1966 he felt that Trochosuchus was distinct from other lycosuchids and instead assigned it to another family, the Alopecodontidae (a family otherwise made up of what are now scylacosaurids). This is despite the fact that Romer had previously considered the genera Trochosuchus and Trochosaurus synonymous while under Trochosuchidae. Although Lycosuchidae has priority over either name, some authors perpetuated the use of Trochosuchidae and Trochosauridae, including some who used the former well after Romer proposed replacing it with Trochosauridae (e.g. Charles Lewis Camp and colleagues in 1968 and 1972).

=== Dubious genera ===
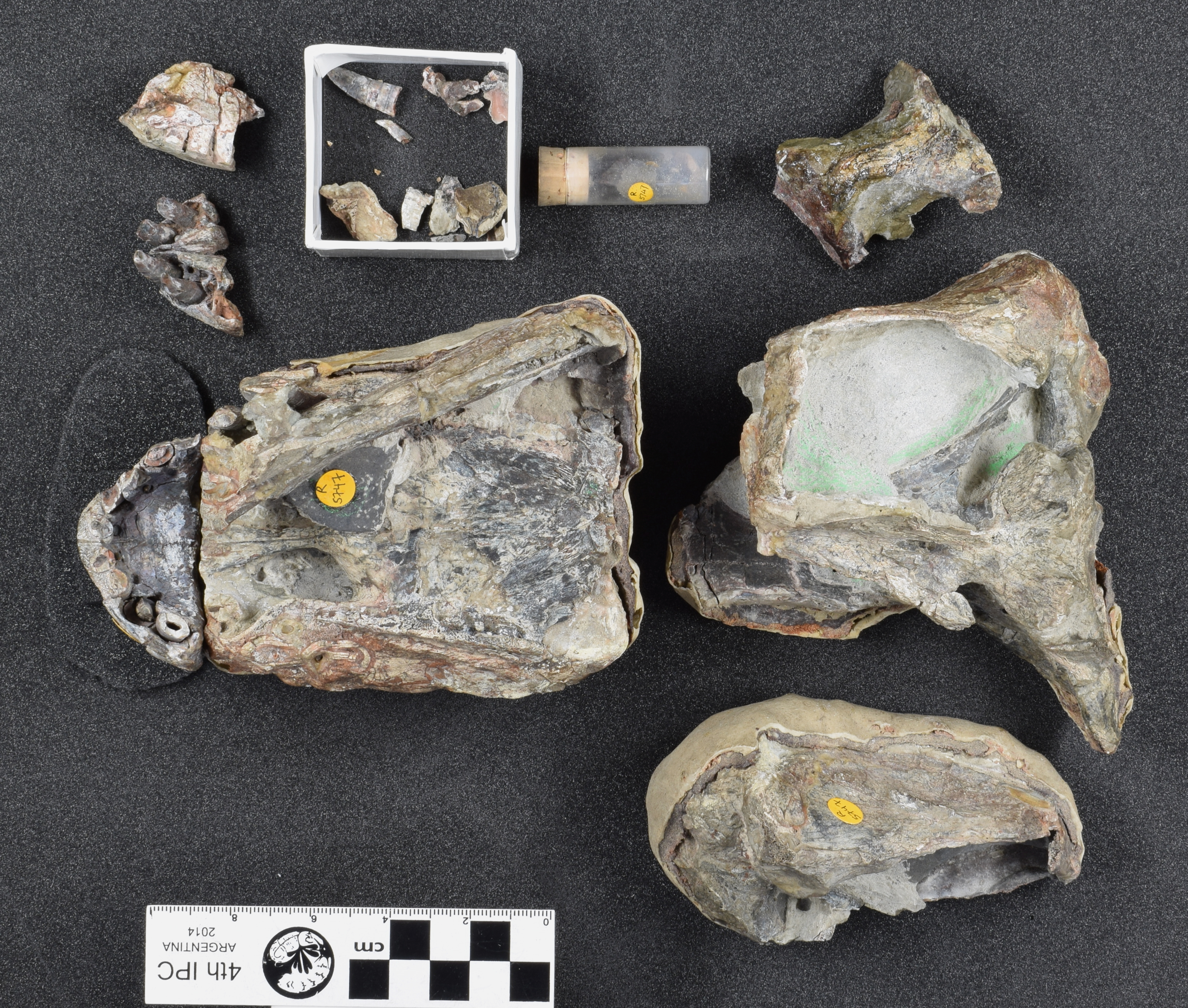
Photo of NHMUK R5747, a referred specimen of the dubious lycosuchid Trochosaurus major, showing the skull and jaw in ventral view

Although now only containing two definitive members, historically a number of other genera have been assigned to Lycosuchidae (or its equivalent grouping by the author). However, all other genera besides Lycosuchus that have been assigned to Lycosuchidae are now regarded as nomina dubia, or dubious names, meaning they cannot be reliably distinguished from other lycosuchids. These include the aforementioned genera Trochosuchus and Trochosaurus, as well as Hyaenasuchus, Trochorhinus and Zinnosaurus. Consequently, the majority of specimens attributed to Lycosuchidae are incertae sedis, with only a few being attributable to diagnosable taxa (i.e. Lycosuchus and Simorhinella).

The dubiousness of all other historically named lycosuchids is in part due to the often poor quality of their type material, which are often incomplete and badly weathered. Another confounding factor is that several were primarily or entirely distinguished based only on features such as the relative proportions of the canines, snout, and number of postcanine teeth—features now known to be individually variable, subject to taphonomic distortion, and associated tooth replacement—as is the case for Trochosuchus, Trochosaurus and Trochorhinus. Furthermore, the only valid lycosuchid genera, Simorhinella and Lycosuchus, are only distinguished by features of its palate and jaw joint. As such, other lycosuchids cannot be identified to a genus if the palate is obscured, even in adequately preserved specimens, as in the holotypes of Hyaenasuchus and Zinnosaurus. Likewise, the loosely attached jaw joint is often missing or obscured by the mandible in most specimens.

Another dubious genus of early therocephalian, Scymnosaurus, was never historically allied directly to other lycosuchids. However, the type species S. ferox and a second species, S. major, are based upon lycosuchid fossils, along with several other specimens that were referred to Scymnosaurus sp. Consequently, following the revision of Lycosuchidae by Abdala and colleagues in 2014, Scymnosaurus is regarded as an additional dubious genus of lycosuchid represented by indeterminate material. Not all specimens of Scymnosaurus represent lycosuchids, however, and a third dubious species, S. watsoni, is based on the fossils of an indeterminate scylacosaurid.

=== Phylogeny ===
An early phylogenetic hypothesis for lycosuchids (i.e. their evolutionary relationships) was proposed by Broom in 1908 before the family had even been established. In it, Broom hypothesised that genera that would later become lycosuchids were one of several lines of descent from a primitive therocephalian common ancestor, namely Alopecodon. From this ancestor, Broom traced a direct line of descent from Hyaenasuchus, to Trochosuchus and finally into Lycosuchus. This line of descent was based upon their dentition, beginning with the acquisition of "double canines" in Hyaenasuchus, followed by a decrease in the number of incisors from six to five in Trochosuchus and finally to the loss of most postcanines in Lycosuchus. Later researchers in the 20th century did not examine the evolutionary relationships of lycosuchids in detail, but the presence of two pairs of canines was often taken to be "primitive" and indicate they were an early diverging lineage.

Following the taxonomic work of van den Heever in the 1980s, Lycosuchidae become functionally monotypic and subsequently phylogenetic analyses of therocephalians analysing their relationships cladistically have only ever included Lycosuchus to represent the group. With only one taxon to include, it is difficult to assess whether Lycosuchidae as recognised (including the various indeterminate specimens attributed to it) definitively forms a clade. For example, the first cladistic analysis of therocephalians by Hopson and Barghusen (1986) simply subsumed Lycosuchus into Pristerognathidae (=Scylacosauridae) functionally as a single family of early therocephalians for analysis. Nonetheless, a revision of Scylacosauridae in 2023 by Christian F. Kammerer has explicitly defined Scylacosauridae to exclude Lycosuchus as a distinct phylogenetic unit. In most subsequent analyses, Lycosuchus has consistently been recovered as the earliest branching member, or most basal, of Therocephalia as shown in the cladograms below. This is similar to what Broom first proposed back in 1908, despite the fact that the "double canines" are no longer recognised as valid or even a "primitive" (plesiomorphic, or ancestral) trait for therocephalians.

Although Simorhinella has also been regarded as a lycosuchid since 2014, it has yet to be included in a phylogenetic analysis to test the family's potential monophyly. Notably, Abdala and colleagues in 2014 highlight that while Simorhinella possesses the diagnostic characteristics of Lycosuchidae, it also has several traits in its palate found in scylacosaurids but not seen in Lycosuchus. This raises the possibility that Lycosuchidae as currently recognised is paraphyletic relative to scylacosaurian therocephalians (Scylacosauridae + Eutherocephalia), with Simorhinella potentially closer to Scylacosauria.

On the other hand, the Russian therocephalian Gorynychus was recovered as the sister taxon of Lycosuchus by Jun Liu and Abdala in 2019, effectively in a monophyletic Lycosuchidae (shown below, left). However, this result was only recovered under the majority rule consensus (i.e. it was not recovered in every iteration of the analysis), and it has only been recovered once since then. Indeed, most subsequent analyses of this dataset (such as Liu and Abdala, 2023, below right cladogram) have found Gorynychus to be placed intermediately between Lycosuchus and Scylacosauria (as would be the suggested position of Simorhinella). Gorynychus was also assigned to Lycosuchidae by Julia Suchkova and Valeriy Golubev in 2018, independently of these phylogenetic results, when they named G. sundyrensis. However, this was based entirely on anatomical similarities and was not supported by any phylogenetic analysis.

Relationships within bolded terminal clades are not shown in any of the simplified cladograms below.

Liu & Abdala (2019):

- Theriodontia
  - Gorgonopsia
  - Eutheriodontia
    - Cynodontia
      - Charassognathus
      - - Procynosuchus
        - Dvinia
    - Therocephalia
      - - Gorynychus
        - Lycosuchus
      - - Scylacosauridae
          - - Pristerognathus
            - Glanosuchus
          - - Scylacosaurus
            - Pardosuchus
            - Ictidosaurus
            - Alopecodon
        - **Eutherocephalia**

Liu & Abdala (2023):

- Theriodontia
  - Gorgonopsia
  - Eutheriodontia
    - Cynodontia
      - Charassognathus
      - - Dvinia
        - Procynosuchus
    - Therocephalia
      - Lycosuchus
      - - Gorynychus
        - - Scylacosauridae
            - Alopecodon
            - - Pardosuchus
              - - Scylacosaurus
                - Ictidosaurus
                - - Pristerognathus
                  - Glanosuchus
          - **Eutherocephalia**

Note that in both cladograms, regardless of the placement of Gorynychus, Lycosuchus is placed in the earliest diverging (basalmost) branch of Therocephalia. This result has been consistently recovered in most phylogenetic analyses of therocephalian relationships, while scylacosaurids are closer to Eutherocephalia. Contrary to these results, a recent analysis from 2024 with the aim of analysing the relationships of early cynodonts and therocephalians focusing on endocranial characteristics found a paraphyletic Therocephalia in which Lycosuchus and Alopecognathus (representing scylacosaurids) were instead sister taxa, forming a clade that was itself the sister of Eutherocephalia + Cynodontia.

- Theriodontia
  - Cynariops
  - Therocephalia/ Eutheriodontia
    - - Lycosuchus (=Lycosuchidae)
      - Alopecognathus (=Scylacosauridae)
    - - Eutherocephalia
        - Olivierosuchus
        - Theriognathus
      - Cynodontia
        - Charassognathidae
          - Charassognathus
          - Abdalodon
        - - Dvinia
          - - Procynosuchus
            - **Epicynodontia**

== Evolution and extinction ==
Although lycosuchids are believed to have evolutionarily diverged earlier than scylacosaurid therocephalians, the latter appear in the fossil record before lycosuchids do, with representatives from the Eodicynodon Assemblage Zone (AZ), the lowest and oldest biozone of the Beaufort Group. This suggests lycosuchids have a ghost lineage missing from the fossil record that extends at least as far back as them into the Wordian stage of the Middle Permian, roughly between 266.9 and 264.7 million years ago. The fossil record of lycosuchids does not pick up until well into the Tapinocephalus AZ, with the stratigraphically lowest (and therefore oldest) specimens being the holotypes of the dubious Trochorhinus and Trochosaurus intermedius from the locality Abrahamskraal 29 in the Moordenaars Member of the Abrahaamskraal Formation, corresponding to the upper Tapinocephalus AZ (or the Diictodon-Styracocephalus subzone) and so approximately by 262 million years ago.

Both Simorhinella and Lycosuchus appear in the upper Tapinocephalus AZ, though Simorhinella appears first and only briefly overlaps with the first appearance of Lycosuchus before it disappears. During this interval, lycosuchids were among the largest predatory therocephalians in the ecosystem, although they remained subordinate to the giant dinocephalian Anteosaurus. The disappearance of Simorhinella coincides with the Capitanian mass extinction event, and Simorhinella may have been a casualty of the mass extinction along with many scylacosaurids and other members of the Tapinocephalus AZ fauna, including dinocephalians like Anteosaurus. On the other hand, Lycosuchus survived the extinction and went on to persist well into the subsequent Endothiodon AZ, even in part defining the Lycosuchus-Eunotosaurus Subzone. Both genera are large carnivorous therocephalians, so body size alone does not appear to have been a majorly contributing factor towards extinction or survival of lycosuchids. Although Lycosuchus survived the extinction, Lycosuchidae appears to have been a "dead clade walking", with its final extinction being delayed some time after the initial pulse of extinction. The causes for the final extinction of Lycosuchidae is unclear, as their available prey did not seem to be affected, but it is also associated with the extinction of other survivors of the mass extinction (including the remaining scylacosaurids).
