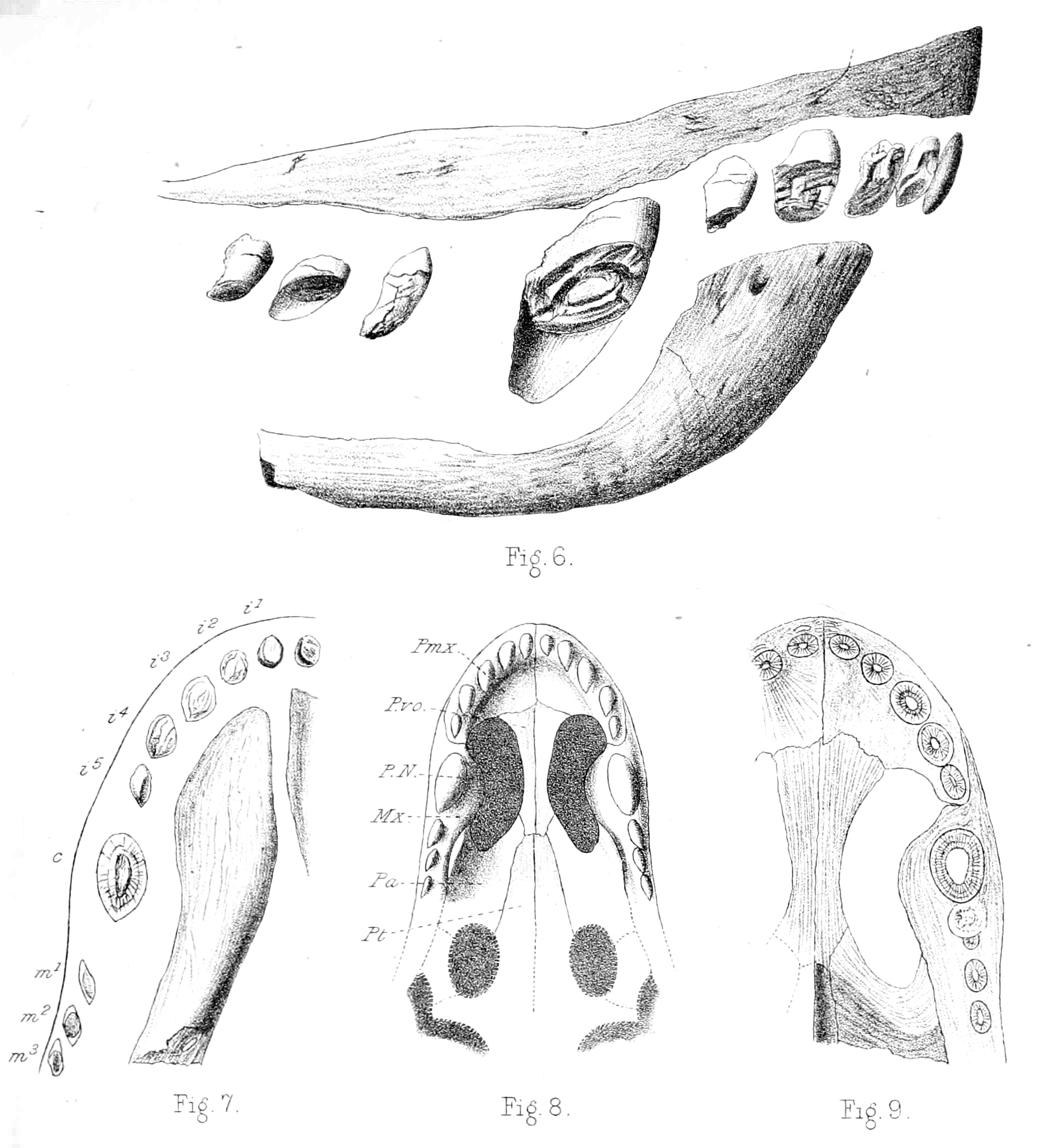
- Illustrations of the holotype snout of Scymnosaurus ferox, SAM-PK-632, by Robert Broom in 1903

Scientific classification
- Kingdom: Animalia
- Phylum: Chordata
- Clade: Synapsida
- Clade: Therapsida
- Clade: †Therocephalia
- Family: †Lycosuchidae
- Genus: †Scymnosaurus; Broom, 1903 (nomen dubium)

Type species
- †Scymnosaurus ferox Broom, 1903 Nomen dubium (=Lycosuchidae incertae sedis)

Assigned species
- †Scylacosauridae: †S. watsoni Broom, 1915 (nomen dubium) (=Scylacosauridae incertae sedis); †Lycosuchidae: †S. major Boonstra, 1954 (nomen dubium) (=Lycosuchidae incertae sedis)

= Scymnosaurus =

Scymnosaurus Temporal range: Middle Permian (Capitanian), ~262–260 Ma

Dubious genus of therapsids from middle Permian South Africa

Scymnosaurus is a dubious genus of therocephalian therapsids from the Middle Permian of what is now South Africa based upon the fossils of large, but indeterminate, early therocephalians. The genus and its type species S. ferox was named by Robert Broom in 1903, followed by S. watsoni in 1915. A third species, S. major, was named by Lieuwe Dirk Boonstra in 1954, who also referred many more specimens to the genus as Scymnosaurus sp.

The genus Scymnosaurus and its species are all considered nomina dubia today, meaning the fossils have no distinguishing (diagnostic) traits to define each species or to unite them together as a distinct genus. Indeed, Scymnosaurus includes specimens that have since been determined to belong to two separate families of carnivorous early therocephalians. Most specimens, including those of S. ferox and S. major, represent indeterminate (incertae sedis) specimens from the family Lycosuchidae, while the sole skull of S. watsoni belongs to an indeterminate member of Scylacosauridae. Though Scymnosaurus watsoni represents a scylacosaurid, because the type species S. ferox is identifiable as a lycosuchid, the genus Scymnosaurus itself is regarded as a dubious lycosuchid.

Most specimens attributed to Scymnosaurus are fragmentary, often only partial snouts and jaws. The genus was originally defined in part upon a specific shared tooth count, which is now known to be unreliable for diagnosing early therocephalians and the same dental formula is now known to be typical of lycosuchids in general. The only other consistent feature to unite these fossils is their large size, and though not diagnostic, they notably include some of the largest known specimens of any therocephalians, with the largest specimens representing skulls estimated to exceed 40 cm (16 in) in length.

== History and taxonomy ==
=== S. ferox ===
Scymnosaurus and its type species S. ferox were named in 1903 by Robert Broom for the holotype specimen SAM-PK-632, originally collected on an expedition by J. R. Joubert from an unknown locality in 1881 and now housed in the Iziko South African Museum (SAM). It is a tightly closed (occluded) partial snout and jaws consisting of only the very front portion around the incisors and canines up to and including the third postcanine tooth, with the entirety of the snout above the roots of the teeth missing such that the internal anatomy of the palate and roots of the teeth are exposed. Though fragmentary, the specimen had (at the time) a unique dental formula (count and types of teeth)—five incisors, one canine, and only three small postcanines on each side—that Broom used to defined the genus. SAM-PK-632 was notable for its large size, described by Broom as the second largest theriodont (then all carnivorous therapsids) known at the time after Titanosuchus (now known to be a dinocephalian) and belonging to an animal he believed to be the size of a hyena. Indeed, it remains one of the largest therocephalian skulls on record, as though it is incomplete the preserved portion of its snout is proportionately comparable to that of the related Simorhinella, one of the largest therocephalians recognised today with a total skull length of 37 cm (15 in).

Additional specimens were later referred to S. ferox by Lieuwe Dirk Boonstra; SAM-PK-9084 in 1953, collected by Boonstra from locality Riet Kuil 387 in 1929, and SAM-PK-3430 and 4341 in 1954, collected by Sidney H. Haughton in 1916 from Janwillemsfontein and Stinkfontein, respectively. Both SAM-PK-3430 and 4341 are similar specimens to the holotype, preserving occluded snouts and jaws as far as the postcanines (though slightly more completely), while SAM-PK-9084 is a more complete but distorted skull and jaws that includes most of the jaws but only the snout and eyes of the skull, missing the temporal region, along with partial limb bones. Boonstra referred all three to S. ferox on the basis of sharing the same dental formula and estimating that all three were of similar size to the holotype. However, Boonstra misinterpreted the dental formula of SAM-PK-4341, and it has been reidentified as a specimen of the scylacosaurid therocephalian Glanosuchus.

=== S. watsoni ===
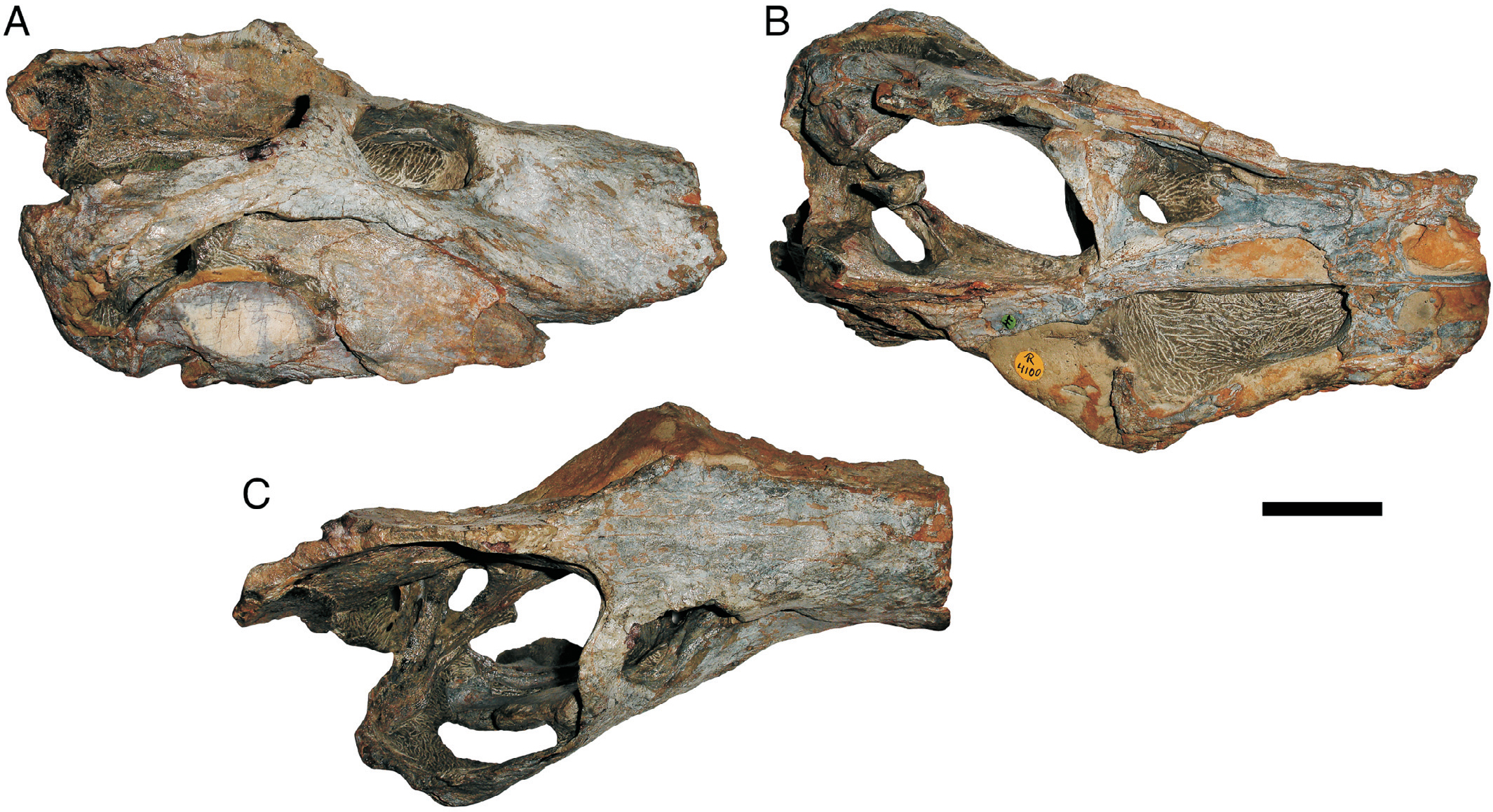
NHMUK PV R 4100, an indeterminate scylacosaurid skull and holotype of S. watsoni

In 1915, Broom named the species S. watsoni from a skull in the collections of the Natural History Museum, London catalogued NHMUK PV R 410, originally purchased in 1878 from Thomas Bain, a pioneering road engineer from South Africa with an interest in Karoo geology. This skull had already been published upon the year prior by David M. S. Watson, who described the bones of its palate and doubtfully assigned the specimen to Lycosuchus. Having examined the skull after further preparation, Broom instead assigned NHMUK PV R 410 to Scymnosaurus as a new species. He did so the basis of it sharing a similar dental formula as S. ferox, in spite of the fact the skull is missing the front end of the snout, including the incisors and most of the canines, while S. ferox is known mostly from just this region. Broom acknowledged there was room for doubt in assigning S. watsoni to Scymnosaurus because of this, but nonetheless believed it and S. ferox to be "certainly closely allied". In his 1932 book The Mammal-like Reptiles of South Africa and the Origin of Mammals Broom remained doubtful of its placement in Scymnosaurus, but retained it in the genus nonetheless. S. watsoni was further examined by Watson in 1921 and again by Boonstra in 1934, who together revised the anatomy of its occiput, braincase and palate.

In 1954, Boonstra named a new genus and species of early therocephalian Pristerosaurus microdon (now a junior synonym of Mairasaurus) and reassigned S. watsoni to this genus as the new combination Pristerosaurus watsoni, claiming that it could not be included under Scymnosaurus (or Lycosuchus as Watson originally proposed). Boonstra later backtracked on this assignment and reverted S. watsoni to Scymnosaurus once again in a 1969 paper without comment. When revising the taxonomy of scylacosaurids in 2023, Christian Kammerer commented that S. watsoni indeed closely resembles Mairasaurus (i.e. "Pristerosaurus") proportionately, but as the latter is known only by one similarly sized specimen more information on its anatomy would be needed to investigate any potential affinities as Boonstra had suggested.

=== S. major ===
In 1954 Boonstra named a third species S. major from two incomplete but very large partial snouts he each estimated to belong to skulls over 400 mm (16 in) long when complete. Both skulls were collected by Boonstra in 1929 from two separate expeditions into the Karoo, the first recovering the holotype SAM-PK-9005 at the Kleinkoedoeskop locality and later the second skull SAM-PK-10556 from Knoffelfontein, where it was originally discovered by the farm's owner. SAM-PK-9005 is also associated with some postcranial bones, namely parts of the shoulder and hip girdles and the ends of several limb bones that Boonstra went on to describe in 1964. Boonstra included S. major in Scymnosaurus on the basis of its large size and similar dental formula, but only differentiated it from S. ferox by larger size and subtle perceived differences of the jaw and the bones of the skull. These included slightly fewer postcanines (2-3 versus 3-4), a supposedly steeper "chin" at the mandibular symphysis (where the two jaw bones meet), and the frontal bone (a bone on the roof of the skull between the eyes) not reaching the edge of the eye socket.

=== Other specimens ===
Boonstra referred five more specimens to Scymnosaurus in 1954, though he was unable to determine if they belonged to either S. ferox or S. major and so only referred them to Scymnosaurus sp. Most specimens were collected by Boonstra himself and his colleagues on various trips during the first half of the 20th century; SAM-PK-9126 collected from Voelfontein in 1929, SAM-PK-11459 from Buffelsvlei in 1939, SAM-PK-11833 from Lammerkraal in 1947, and SAM-PK-11961 from Dikbome (date unspecified). It is not known when the fifth specimen in the museum's collections SAM-PK-8999 was collected, or by who. Like most other specimens under Scymnosaurus they consist of only the snout and occluded lower jaws to varying degrees of completeness and preservation quality, and were referred to Scymnosaurus mostly due to their dental formula.

In 1964 Boonstra referred many more specimens to Scymnosaurus sp.; SAM-PK-11577, 11695, 11957, 12118, 12193, 12262, K352 and K353, with another specimen SAM-PK-11558A only doubtfully referred to "Scymnosaurus?". Almost all of these specimens are based upon only postcranial bones from the skeleton, mainly limbs and their girdles (i.e. shoulder and hips), with SAM-PK-11695 being the only specimen among them to preserve part of the skull comparable to other Scymnosaurus specimens (though SAM-PK-12193 included a partial jaw bone). However, this skull was identified as that of Glanosuchus by Kammerer in 2023, without any reference to the postcrania. Similarly, Boonstra had previously referred SAM-PK-11957 to Pristerognathus in 1954 and originally included a partial skull in the same specimen, but excluded the skull in 1964. The skull was later reidentified as Ictidosaurus, another early therocephalian now regarded as dubious. Unlike the cranial specimens, none of the postcranial specimens have been re-examined and had their taxonomic affinities reassessed since Boonstra's work.

A fourth species once included under Scymnosaurus was S. warreni, named by Broom in March 1907 from a specimen discovered in KwaZulu-Natal, NM 188. Like most other Scymnosaurus specimens NM 188 is an occluded, and somewhat crushed, partial snout and lower jaws (though the lower jaws have since been lost, leaving only impressions). Broom assigned it to Scymnosaurus due to its similar dental formula, but regarded the assignment as provisional. In 1932 he recognised that the specimen actually belonged to the akidnognathid therocephalian Moschorhinus and reassigned the species to the genus as the new combination M. warreni. This species is regarded by subsequent researchers to be synonymous with the type species of Moschorhinus, M. kitchingi.

=== Taxonomy and validity ===
Named in 1903, Scymnosaurus was among the first genera assigned to Therocephalia after Broom had not long named the order earlier that year. At the time, Therocephalia also included the dinocephalian Titanosuchus (among other genera now known to not be therocephalians), which Broom believed to "undoubtedly" be the closest relative of Scymnosaurus. As Therocephalia became better established, Scymnosaurus was regarded as representative of typical early therocephalians—though early in the 20th century both Watson and Samuel W. Williston would each classify Scymnosaurus as a gorgonopsian without comment in separate publications—and was classified in the family "Pristerognathidae" (now correctly known as Scylacosauridae), to which most early therocephalians were thought to belong to. Scymnosaurus would even be used as the basis of the subfamily Scymnosaurinae that was proposed by Boonstra in 1969 for large "pristerognathids" like Scymnosaurus.

The historic diagnosis for Scymnosaurus mostly relied on large size and a dental formula of five upper incisors, one canine and at most four postcanines. In 1954 Boonstra incorporated additional traits into its diagnosis, but most of the features he listed are generalised among early therocephalians. Indeed, when Boonstra revised its diagnosis in 1969 he would limit it entirely to the small size and number of its postcanines. Similarly, he only distinguished S. major from S. ferox by slightly different postcanine counts (2-3 versus 3-4), a stronger, steeper symphysis, its larger size, and the supposed absence of the frontal bone from the border of the eye socket.

In 1987, palaeontologist Juri van den Heever re-examined and revised the taxonomy of all early therocephalians known from cranial remains as part of his PhD thesis, and could not identify any unique traits that characterised Scymnosaurus or its species. Notably, he identified both size and tooth count alone as an unreliable method for diagnosing early therocephalians, particularly the precise number of postcanines, and so the dental formula of Scymnosaurus was not unique. Further, he determined that the frontals in supposed S. major specimens did in fact reach the eyes, as in supposed S. ferox, and that the poorly preserved dentary symphyses of S. major could not be shown to actually be different from S. ferox. Consequently, S. ferox and S. major could not be distinguished, nor could Scymnosaurus as a whole be distinguished from other early therocephalians, and so Scymnosaurus, S. ferox and S. major were all therefore declared to be nomina dubia (dubious names). S. watsoni likewise lacks any distinguishing features of its own or that would unite it with other species of Scymnosaurus, and was also declared a nomen dubium.

All the specimens under Scymnosaurus van den Heever examined could only be identified as far as the family level of taxonomy, but most specimens belong to the Lycosuchidae, including three of the four specimens of S. ferox, both specimens of S. major, and two referred to S. sp. (SAM-PK-8999 and 11961). These specimens are now classified as Lycosuchidae incertae sedis, or Lycosuchidae indet. On the other hand, the sole skull of S. watsoni was identified as an indeterminate specimen of Scylacosauridae (Scylacosauridae incertae sedis), along with the referred S. ferox specimen SAM-PK-4341 that was identified as the scylacosaurid Glanosuchus. The remaining specimens, all referred to Scymnosaurus sp., are so incomplete that they lack diagnostic traits of either family. Two (SAM-PK-11459 and 11833) are only identifiable as therocephalians by their loose and sloping mandibular symphyses, but as they only preserve the first few incisors it cannot be determined if they are lycosuchid or scylacosaurid (and so are Therocephalia incertae sedis). The remaining specimen SAM-PK-9126 preserves the five upper incisors of lycosuchids, but is missing its lower jaw and so cannot even be distinguished as a therocephalian or gorgonopsian (which have a fused, steeper mandibular symphysis), and can only be classified to Theriodontia incertae sedis. A more recent revision of lycosuchid taxonomy by Fernando Abdala and colleagues in 2014 upheld his conclusions, referring almost all Scymnosaurus skulls to Lycosuchidae incertae sedis and identifying Lycosuchus and Simorhinella as the only valid lycosuchids. The revision of scylacosaurids by Kammerer in 2023 also upheld S. watsoni as dubious and only representing Scylacosauridae incertae sedis, though noted potential similarities to Mairasaurus.

=== Geological background ===
Although the geographic source for the holotype itself is unknown, most other specimens of Scymnosaurus consistently recognised by researchers (i.e. S. ferox, S. watsoni, S. major and two S. sp.) were discovered in the Beaufort West Municipality of the Central Karoo in South Africa (SAM-PK-9084, SAM-PK-9005 and SAM-PK-10556), with two from the neighbouring Prince Albert (NHMUK PV R 4100, SAM-PK-3430) and another from the Laingsburg Municipalities (SAM-PK-11961). The remaining specimens originally assigned to Scymnosaurus sp. are likewise from Prince Albert (SAM-PK-11813, 9216) and Beaufort West (SAM-PK-11459). Most of Boonstra's postcranial specimens also come from Beaufort West, with two more from Prince Albert (SAM-PK-11957, 12118) and one from Laingsburg (SAM-PK-K352), but with two others from near Fraserburg also (SAM-PK-11695 and SAM-PK-12262). All of these regions belong to the Beaufort Group of the Karoo Basin, and more specifically from areas that expose rock layers of the Abrahamskraal Formation. These correspond to the upper Tapinocephalus Assemblage Zone (AZ) faunal zone, in which both lycosuchid and scylacosaurid therocephalian fossils are abundant.

While the source localities for the holotype as well as SAM-PK-8999 (S. sp.) are unknown, lycosuchid fossils are restricted to the Tapinocephalus AZ and into the lower layers of the subsequent Endothiodon AZ from rocks of the overlying Teekloof Formation, though they are mostly known from the Tapinocephalus AZ. Scylacosaurids like S. watsoni have the same upper bound, but are known from older rocks that date to the Eodicynodon AZ. The upper Tapinocephalus AZ (a.k.a. the Diictodon-Styracocephalus Subzone) is roughly dated to between 262 and 260 million years ago during the late Capitanian stage of the Middle Permian period.

== Description ==
Specimens of Scymnosaurus represent large to very large therocephalians, among the largest of any therocephalians known. All the skulls referred to Scymnosaurus are incomplete, often only partial snouts and associated jaws with only a few preserving the orbital region around the eyes. However, from comparing their proportions to related, more complete therocephalians, the estimates for the complete skull length have ranged from comparable to Simorhinella (i.e. 370 mm (15 in) long) for specimens referred to S. ferox and up to between 450 mm (18 in) and 474 mm (18.7 in) long for S. major—though these estimates are based upon reconstructions made prior to modern classifications. More direct comparisons between the equivalent portions of the snout show that the type specimen of S. ferox (180 mm (7.1 in) snout) is similar in size to Simorhinella (182 mm (7.2 in) snout), while the snout of SAM-PK-9005 (S. major) measures 226 mm (8.9 in) long. Apart from size, Scymnosaurus was also historically diagnosed by a dental formula of five large upper incisors, a very large single canine, and only two to four small postcanines, all serrated. Otherwise, specimens under Scymnosaurus have no uniquely distinguishing traits beyond the typical characteristics of the families they belong to (and hence are nomina dubia).

Most specimens of Scymnosaurus, including those of S. ferox and S. major, are identifiable as lycosuchids (Lycosuchidae incertae sedis). Like all lycosuchids their snouts are broad and proportionately short compared to scylacosaurids (albeit some specimens are distorted). All of these specimens have five incisors in each premaxilla and less than five small postcanines behind the large canine, both characteristic of lycosuchids compared to scylacosaurids, which have more of each. Notably, no specimens attributed to Scymnosaurus have the "double canines" seen in many other lycosuchid specimens. (Note: "Double canines", i.e. two distinct pairs of simultaneously functional canine teeth, were once thought to be a defining characteristic of lycosuchids. However, it has since been realised that this condition represents the overlap between an older canine and its alternated replacement, one behind the other. Alternating the position of the canine is the typical mode of replacement in predatory therapsids (such as gorgonopsians), though active replacement canines co-occur with the functional predecessor much more often in lycosuchids than in other therapsids, where the old canine is shed and functionally replaced with minimal overlap.) However, lycosuchid "double canines" are now recognised to be a product of tooth replacement rather than being the typical appearance, and indeed the broken or resorbed roots of the alternate canines are observed in several specimens of Scymnosaurus. In at least one large specimen of S. major the upper margin of the orbit is thickened and rugose, obscuring sutures and hence why Boonstra initially thought the frontal did not reach the edge. This appears to be a typical feature of large and mature specimens of lycosuchids, as it is also seen in Lycosuchus

=== S. watsoni ===
In contrast, S. watsoni is identifiable as an indeterminate scylacosaurid. Scylacosaurid skulls are proportionately longer and narrower than lycosuchids, mostly in the snout, and they typically have more teeth, though the skull of S. watsoni is distorted and the missing front end of the snout precludes identifying its incisor count. However, it does preserve the pterygoid bones of the palate, which lack palatal pterygoid teeth. This is a trait found in scylacosaurids but not lycosuchids, which do have pterygoid teeth.

S. watsoni is somewhat smaller than S. ferox and S. major, and in 1915 Broom estimated its complete skull length to be approximately 290 mm (11 in). Broom highlighted the large temporal fenestra and very tall and thin sagittal crest between them as distinctive, but tall sagittal crests appear typical of all large scylacosaurid specimens and both its height and the broad fenestra have probably been distorted during fossilisation (taphonomy). Though relatively complete, its poor state of preservation hinders identification any further than Scylacosauridae indet., though its proportions are similar to those of the rare scylacosaurid Mairasaurus. However, unlike definitive Mairasaurus specimens its orbits are visible when viewed from above, rather than facing mostly out to the side as is characteristic of Mairasaurus, though the potential taxonomic significance of this difference is unclear.
