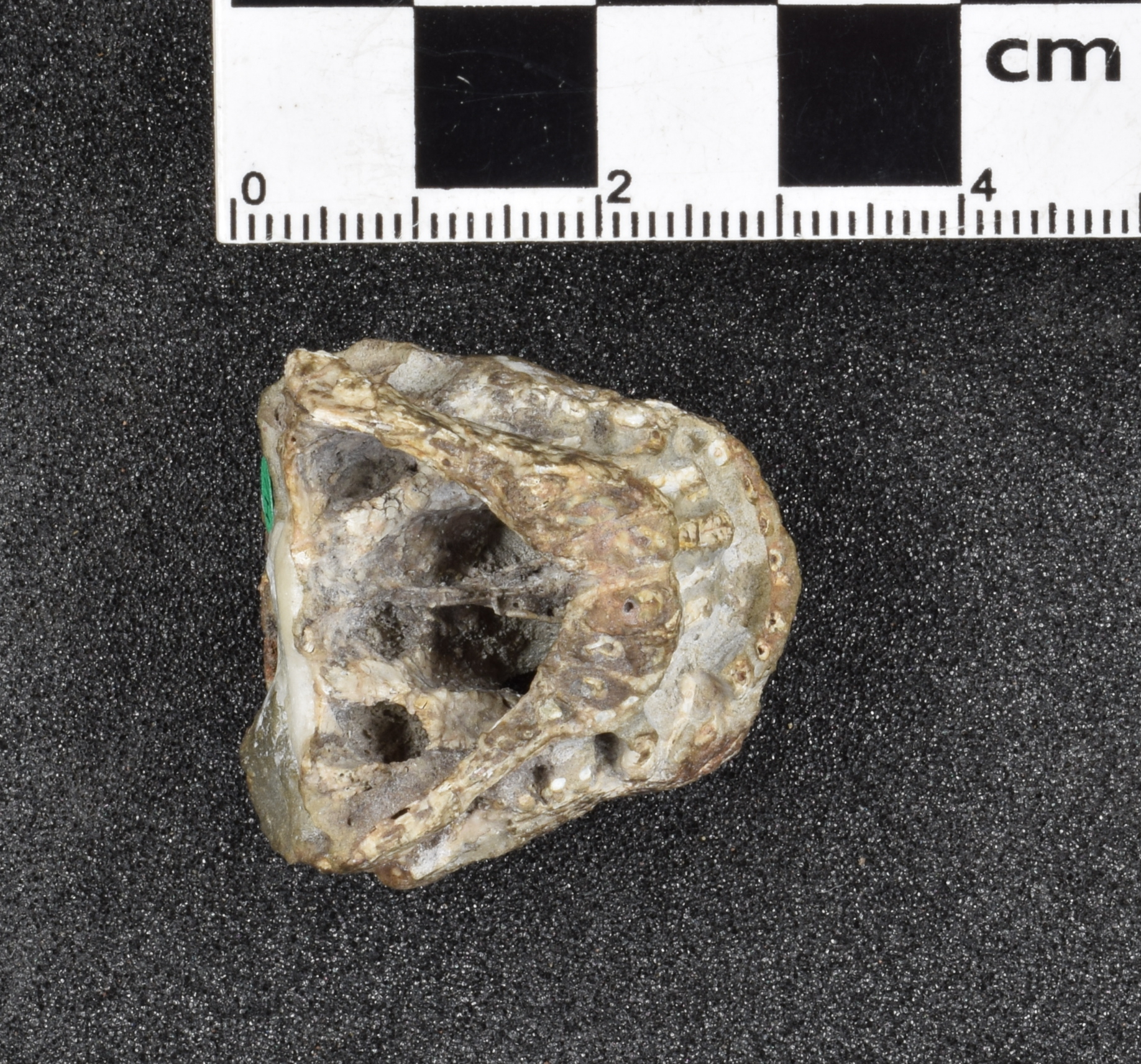
- Holotype specimen of Simorhinella (NHMUK 49422), a partial skull and jaws of a young juvenile, viewed from below

Scientific classification
- Kingdom: Animalia
- Phylum: Chordata
- Clade: Synapsida
- Clade: Therapsida
- Clade: †Therocephalia
- Family: †Lycosuchidae
- Genus: †Simorhinella; Broom, 1915
- Species: †S. baini

Binomial name
- †Simorhinella baini Broom, 1915

= Simorhinella =

Simorhinella Temporal range: Middle Permian (late Capitanian) 262–260 Ma

Extinct genus of therapsids from the Late Permian of South Africa

Simorhinella (meaning "flattened snout") is a genus of large early therocephalian (an extinct type of therapsid, the group that modern mammals belong to) that lived roughly 262–260 million years ago, during the Middle Permian period, from what is now South Africa. The type and only species is S. baini, first described in 1915 by Robert Broom from a partial juvenile skull discovered during the 19th century at Prince Albert, in Western Cape. The skull being unusual with his extremely short and broad snout, unlike that of other early therocephalians, its systematic position within the group consequently remained uncertain for much of the 20th and early 21st centuries. In 2014, the discovery of a large skull at Victoria West, Northern Cape, identified as belonging to an adult individual of this genus, particularly due to a distinctive bony crest on the vomer of the palate found in both specimens, suggested that Simorhinella may be closely related to the basal therocephalian Lycosuchus. It is therefore assigned to the family Lycosuchidae, though its precise evolutionary relationships remain untested.

The adult skull specimen reach approximately 37 cm (15 in) in length, placing Simorhinella among the largest therocephalians described to date, although its size is exceeded by that of another indeterminate lycosuchid specimen. The taxon is known from the upper levels of the Abrahamskraal Formation, more specifically within the Tapinocephalus Assemblage Zone. Unlike its contemporary Lycosuchus, Simorhinella disappeared during the mass extinction at the end of the Middle Permian, which led to the decline of most large therocephalians (including many scylacosaurids), as well as large carnivorous therapsids such as the dinocephalian Anteosaurus.

== History of discovery ==
At an indeterminate point during the 19th century, the road engineer and geologist Thomas Charles John Bain discovered a partial fossil skull at the Weltevreden farm in the Prince Albert district of Western Cape Province, South Africa. This specimen was subsequently acquired in 1878 by the British Museum (later the Natural History Museum, London), where it has since been catalogued under the number NHMUK (formerly BM) 49422. The fossil remained undescribed until a 1915 study, in which the palaeontologist Robert Broom examined the museum's collection of carnivorous therapsids. He then regarded it as representing a new genus and species of therocephalian, which he named Simorhinella baini. Although Broom's description of this taxon was brief, he correctly identified the skull as belonging to a young juvenile individual. The generic name Simorhinella is derived from the Ancient Greek σιμός (simós, "flattened nose") and ῥίς (rhís, "snout"), combined with the Latin diminutive suffix -ella, together meaning "little flattened snout", in a clear reference to its cranial morphology. The specific name baini honours Bain for his contribution to the discovery of several fossil specimens described by Broom in his publication.

NHMUK 49422 comprises the front half of a skull and lower jaws up to and including the eye sockets. The specimen is weathered and its surfaces are cracked, such that Broom struggled to distinguish the sutures of individual bones. Nonetheless, Broom highlighted the unusual breadth and shortness of the snout, being broader across the eyes than it is long. Broom allied Simorhinella with other small therocephalians such as Ictidognathus and Scaloposaurus, which at the time were classified under the now defunct grouping Scaloposauridae (sometimes known as Scaloposauria)—an artificial collection of small therocephalians often named from juvenile specimens, like Simorhinella.

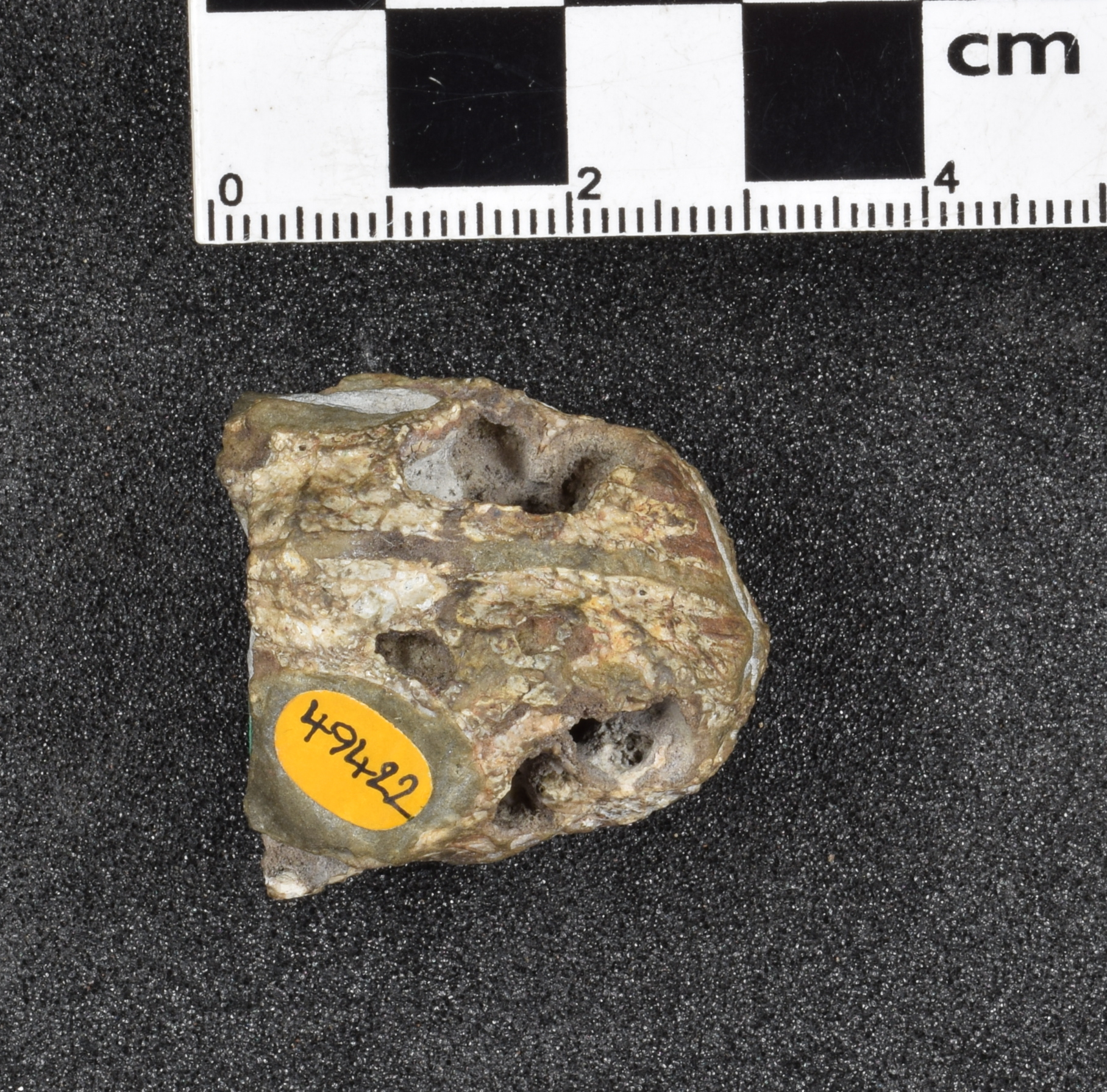
The juvenile holotype of Simorhinella in viewed from above (eyes to the left), note the breadth of the snout

Little was written about Simorhinella in the decades following its description. This was in part because the specimen was incomplete and missing key parts of the skull (such as the intertemporal region) that could indicate its relationship to other therocephalians, as Lieuwe Dirk Boonstra noted in 1954, for example. Indeed, Boonstra would later regard Simorhinella as a nomen dubium (a doubtfully valid scientific name) in 1969 due to its juvenile nature. Growing doubts over the validity of Scaloposauridae and its genera led to further complications, but some authors, namely Christiane Mendrez in 1975, maintained the genus was distinct and upheld Simorhinella as a valid taxon. This uncertainty over its classification persisted into the early 21st century, even with advancements in understanding therocephalian systematics.

In 2014, Fernando Abdala and colleagues described a large skull and a few other associated bones belonging to a lycosuchid therocephalian that was collected from near farm Rheboksfontein 74 in the Victoria West district of Northern Cape Province. Catalogued as BP/1/5592, it was discovered by palaeontologists John Nyaphuli and Bruce S. Rubidge, and is housed at the Evolutionary Studies Institute (formerly the Bernard Price (BP) Institute) of the University of the Witwatersrand in Johannesburg, South Africa. Abdala and colleagues identified BP/1/5592 as an adult specimen of Simorhinella, despite the marked size difference between them (compare its 182 mm (7.2 in) long snout to just 21 mm (0.83 in) in the holotype). Abdala and colleagues found that the two specimens share a unique suite of characteristics suggesting they are adult and juvenile of the same taxon, and that Simorhinella was a valid taxon of lycosuchid. BP/1/5592 comprises a weathered skull missing the lower jaws and most of its teeth, with a few other bones from the postcranial skeleton. The skull of BP/1/5592 has suffered some dorso-ventral compression (from top to bottom), displacing some of the upper surface of the skull backwards relative to the base.

Although the two specimens come from widely separated localities, they were both discovered in regions of the southwestern part of the Karoo Basin that expose layers of rock (strata) belonging to the upper Tapinocephalus Assemblage Zone (AZ) of the Abrahamskraal Formation, one of several geological formations that make up the Beaufort Group in the Karoo Basin. In 2020, the upper strata of the Tapinocephalus AZ (encompassing the stratigraphic range of Simorhinella) was formally defined as the Diictodon-Styracocephalus Subzone, which has been constrained to date between 262 and 260 million years ago during the late Capitanian stage of the Guadalupian (or middle Permian).

== Description ==
Simorhinella is a large therocephalian, with a skull approximately ~37 cm (15 in) long. This makes Simorhinella both one of the largest known lycosuchids and among the largest of any therocephalians altogether. It is only surpassed in dimensions by SAM-PK-9005 (holotype of the dubious lycosuchid Scymnosaurus major), a partial lycosuchid skull with a snout length of 226 mm (8.9 in) compared to the 182 mm (7.2 in) long snout of Simorhinella.

=== Skull and jaws ===
As an adult the skull of Simorhinella is superficially typical of lycosuchids; its snout is relatively low, short and broad with only five upper incisors and few postcanine teeth. Unlike some other lycosuchid specimens, neither specimen of Simorhinella exhibits a pair of so-called "double canines", (Note: "Double canines", i.e. two distinct pairs of simultaneously functional canine teeth, were once thought to be a defining characteristic of lycosuchids. However, it has since been realised that this condition represents the overlapping presence of alternating functional and replacement canines. An alternating pattern of replacement is common amongst predatory therapsids (such as gorgonopsians), though replacement canines co-occur with the functional predecessor much more often in lycosuchids than in other therapsids.) and it only has a single erupted pair (although Broom did initially identify two pairs in the young holotype). The ventral, tooth-bearing edge of the maxilla (alveolar margin) is notably convex, with a slightly concave curvature in front of the canine where it joins the premaxilla. Like Lycosuchus, the alveolar margin is separated from the sides of the maxilla by a discrete flange of bone, however it is less developed in Simorhinella compared to the sharp maxillary ridge or crest of Lycosuchus.

The eye sockets (orbits) are relatively small in the adult and widely separated across the roof of the skull by the broad frontal bones, with a deep suborbital bar formed by the jugal underneath them. The frontals have a prominent ridge running down the middle between the eyes, flanked by a depression on each side. The temporal region behind the eyes is large (only slightly shorter than the snout at 133 millimetres (5.2 in) versus 182 millimetres (7.2 in)) with large temporal fenestra (openings in the skull where jaw muscles attached), although the zygomatic arches that border the fenestra are not preserved. The intertemporal bar between the fenestra is compressed and raised into a tall and strongly arched sagittal crest made up mostly of the parietal bones that rises up behind the pineal foramen (opening for the parietal or "third" eye), although unlike Lycosuchus the crest has a consistent width and is relatively broader, rather than pinched. The upper jaw joint, or quadrate trochlea (the rounded end of the quadrate and quadratojugal bones) is unusual for a therocephalian. The trochlea of Simorhinella is a single smoothly rounded surface, instead of the typical condition in therocephalians (including Lycosuchus) where the trochlea is clearly divided into two condyles, an inner and outer, separated by a groove.

The vomer of the palate is one of the most characteristic bones of Simorhinella due to a raised crest that runs down the middle for much of its length (along with smaller accessory ridges on either side). This crest is found in both specimens of Simorhinella but not in Lycosuchus, and is what most readily distinguishes the two genera. The front portion of the vomer forms a strut that divides the two choanae (the internal nostrils), which are relatively narrow and compressed side-to-side by a bulbous internal extension of the maxilla around the canine roots. Behind the vomer are the paired pterygoid bones, which like other lycosuchids (but unlike other early therocephalians) each bear a row of well-developed palatal teeth on their transverse process—four on each in Simorhinella—while the rounded pterygoid boss at their centers lack teeth. The pterygoids surround a gap between them, the interpterygoid vacuity, with prominent ventrally (downward) projecting ridges around its rim. This differs from Lycosuchus where the bounding ridges are directed down and outwards. On either side of the pterygoids and vomer are the palatine bones, which (like Lycosuchus) have a raised rugose region along their edges running parallel to the toothrow of the maxilla, bordered on the other side by a narrow ridge. This rugose region may have been where the lower postcanines bit against when the jaws were closed.

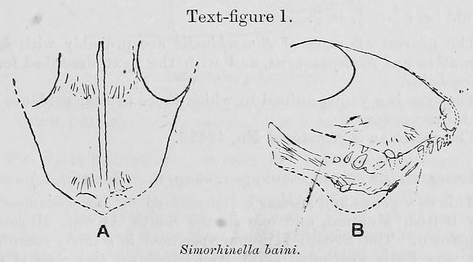
Broom's illustration of the immature holotype

The young holotype is much smaller and does not have the same characteristic proportions of mature lycosuchids, and its proportions and form are much more exaggerated. Like many other juvenile tetrapods the orbits are much larger and the snout is shorter than as adults, measuring just 21 mm long from the preserved tip to the orbits but 28 mm across just in front the eye sockets. Indeed, the snout is so proportionately short that its teeth extend beneath the orbits, despite having only three or four postcanines. Its sutures are also much more open, including a broad gap between the nasal bones, evidence of its very young age. It differs from the adult in that it may only have four upper incisors, rather than five. Nonetheless, the low incisor and postcanine count are characteristic of lycosuchids, and it shares the distinctive vomerine crest with the adult. The mandible of the holotype, the only one known for Simorhinella, is poorly preserved, although the symphysis where the two sides meet at the tip is broad and Broom suggested in his description from 1915 that it was potentially deep as well. He identified three incisors, one canine and three postcanines in each mandible. Such a count is also typical of lycosuchids.

=== Postcranial skeleton ===
Only a small portion of the postcranial skeleton is known for Simorhinella, namely three sections of the vertebral column (one from the neck, rear of the back, and tail), a partial scapula, and an ulna, both from the right shoulder and forelimb. The scapula is a tall and narrow bone, similar in shape to those of other therocephalians. A notable feature is a backward pointing protuberance above the glenoid (shoulder joint) that was likely an attachment for the triceps muscle. This protuberance is uncommon in therocephalians but is seen in other lycosuchid specimens (including the holotype of the dubious Zinnosaurus). The inside surface of the scapula facing the ribcage is split by a prominent ridge, possibly marking out other muscle attachments, though it is uncertain which. The ulna measures 149.6 mm (5.89 in) long and is fairly straight and stout with a short and broad olecranon process extending from the elbow. Such an olecranon is distinctive from other therocephalians, in which it is typically absent or only weakly developed, but is also seen in the large lycosuchid SAM-PK-9005 (the type of "S. major"). Its presence in Simorhinella and other large lycosuchids could be associated with its large body size. The ulna is marked by two well developed muscular fossae (depressions in the bone) on both its inner and outer faces where flexor and extensor muscles attached, respectively.

== Classification ==
Simorhinella has historically been a difficult taxon to classify, largely due to being known by only one specimen of a young juvenile for almost a century. In 1915, Broom originally allied it with other small therocephalians traditionally grouped together in the wastebasket taxon Scaloposauridae, also known as Scaloposauria. The "scaloposaurs" have since been disbanded, with the group being recognised as a polyphyletic collection of various small therocephalians, including juveniles of larger species, belonging to disparate lineages that were artificially grouped together. This brought the potential validity of Simorhinella into question, but the taxon was upheld by Mendrez in 1975, who considered it distinct enough to assign it its own family as the sole member of Simorhinellidae. This purported family's relationships to other therocephalians, however, remained ambiguous and Mendrez herself was uncertain of its classification. Simorhinellidae was not adopted by subsequent researchers, who did not assign Simorhinella to any taxononic families.

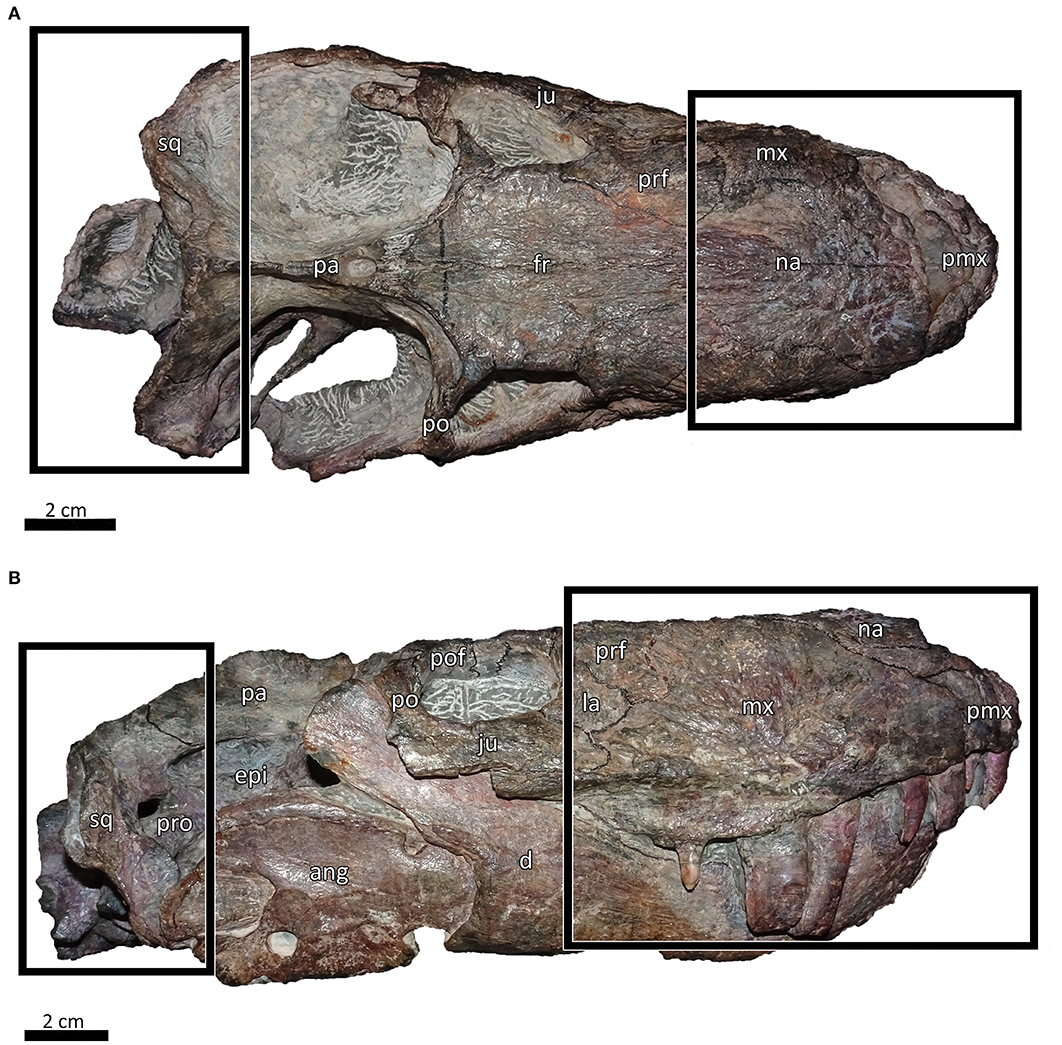
Holotype skull of the related genus Lycosuchus, shown in dorsal and lateral views.

Simorhinella was systematically identified as a member of the family Lycosuchidae by Abdala and colleagues in 2014 after the discovery of the mature specimen by the possession of a suite of traits considered to be diagnostic of the group. These include skull proportions (a short, broad snout, with a wide skull roof between the eyes and deep suborbital bar), low tooth count (five or fewer pairs of incisors and postcanines each with no precanines in the maxilla), and palatal anatomy (presence of a single row of teeth on the transverse process of the pteygoid but none on the prominent and round pterygoid boss, a large interpterygoid vacuity with tubercle in front of it, a rugose maxillary ridge on the palatine, and choanae constricted by an internal maxillary boss around the canines). Many of these traits are shared with Lycosuchus, from which it is predominantly distinguished from by the bony crest of the vomer. Other traits that distinguish Simorhinella from Lycosuchus are the uniformly wide sagittal crest, a proportionately narrower vomer behind the choanae, which are themselves more greatly pinched by the canine boss, and a smooth quadrate trochlea without clearly divided lateral and medial condyles.

This assignment was only made comparatively, however, and Abdala and colleagues did not perform a phylogenetic analysis to test this hypothesis cladistically. Notably, Abadala and colleagues highlighted some features of Simorhinella that are seen in the more derived scylacosaurids and eutherocephalians (i.e. the clade Scylacosauria) but not in Lycosuchus, its presumed closest relative. These include the characteristic crest on the vomer, as well as other features of the palate such as the vertical orientation of the bony walls of the interpterygoid vacuity. These raise the possibility that Simorhinella is in fact more closely related to scylacosaurians than it is to Lycosuchus (a position that would render Lycosuchidae as currently recognised paraphyletic). Simorhinella has yet to be included in a phylogenetic analysis of therocephalians to test this possibility.

== Palaeoecology ==
Simorhinella was one of many carnivorous therocephalians that coexisted in the Diictodon-Styracocephalus Subzone of what would become the upper Abrahamskraal Formation. Among them, its known fossil range overlaps with its close relative Lycosuchus—although the latter only appears near the top of the assemblage zone and so only towards the end of the known range of Simorhinella. All other contemporary therocephalians are the mostly mid-to-large scylacosaurids, although of them only Glanosuchus is known to approach similar skull lengths to Simorhinella. Other scylacosaurids are the large Alopecognathus, Maraisaurus, Pristerognathus, and Scylacosaurus (with maximum skull lengths over 30 cm (12 in)), mid-sized Alopecodon (26 cm (10 in)) and the smaller Pardosuchus (17 cm (6.7 in)). Early therocephalians were both abundant and species-rich, and so were important members of the Tapinocephalus AZ predator guild, although even large genera like Simorhinella were still subordinate to the largest carnivore in the environment, the giant dinocephalian Anteosaurus. Small therapsid carnivores are represented by the diminutive gorgonopsian Eriphostoma and the basal biarmosuchian Hipposaurus, alongside the varanopid "pelycosaur" Heleosaurus.

The largest herbivores from the subzone are predominantly tapinocephalian dinocephalians, represented by twelve genera. These include the tapinocephalids Agnosaurus, Criocephalosaurus, Mormosaurus, Moschognathus, Moschops, Riebeeckosaurus, Struthiocephalus, Struthionops, and Tapinocephalus, the two titanosuchids Jonkeria and Titanosuchus (though these forms may have been omnivorous), as well as Styracocephalus. The only other large herbivores known are the bradysaurians, basal pareiasaurs, namely Bradysaurus, Embrithosaurus, and Nochelesaurus. The roles of medium-sized to small herbivores were occupied mostly by anomodonts, including the diminutive "dromasaurs" Galechirus, Galepus and Galeops, as well as a variety of dicynodonts such as Brachyprosopus, Colobodectes, Emydops, Pristerodon and the smaller pylaecephalids Diictodon, Eosimops, Prosictodon and Robertia. There were also some small reptiles, such as the millerettid Broomia, procolophonomorph Australothyris, and the enigmatic Eunotosaurus.

The depositional environment of the Diictodon-Styracocephalus SZ was an alluvial plain deposited by the river channels and surrounding floodplains of high-energy braided river systems draining from the Cape Fold Mountains from the south and southwest and flowing north and northeast towards the Ecca Sea. The Ecca Sea was receding during this time, and the shore progradated some 400 km to the northeast across the duration of the subzone's deposition. The climate was semi-arid with seasonally fluctuating rainfall, leading to flash flooding of the perennial rivers and ephemeral flow in smaller distributary channels, with the occasional overbank crevasse splays from the rivers. The freshwater environment supported two semi-aquatic rhinesuchid temnospondyl amphibians (Rhinesuchus and Rhinesuchoides) and a variety of fish (the palaeoniscid Atherstonia, Bethesdaichthys, Blourugia, the acrolepid Namaichthys, and Westlepis), as well as the bivalve Palaeanodonta. Vegetation in this environment was dominated by the woody seed plant Glossopteris and equisetales (horsetails), such as Schizoneura, Phyllotheca and Paraschizoneura. Other woody trees of uncertain affinities are also represented by the trunks of Australoxylon and Prototaxoxylon.

=== Extinction ===
Fossils of Simorhinella do not reach at the very top of the Abrahamskraal Formation, disappearing from the fossil record in interval corresponding to the Capitanian mass extinction event that occurred approximately 260 million years ago. This mass extinction wiped out much of the tetrapod diversity in the Tapinocephalus AZ, especially large species, including all of the dinocephalians and pareiasaurs. Large early therocephalians like Simorhinella were similarly effected, which disappeared alongside most of the scylacosaurids (of which only Alopecognathus and Pristerognathus survived). Curiously though, its close relative Lycosuchus not only survived the extinction phase but persisted into the recovery phase of the proceeding Endothiodon Assemblage Zone while Simorhinella perished. That some large therocephalians survived suggests that body size alone was not the sole determining factor in the extinction of other large therocephalians like Simorhinella.
