= Lieuwe Dirk Boonstra =

South African palaeontologist (1905–1975)

- Born: 1905; Volksrust, Transvaal Colony
- Died: 1975 (aged 69–70); Cape Town
- Education: University of Stellenbosch
- Scientific career
- Fields: Palaeontology
- Workplaces: South African Museum
- Thesis: On the osteology and mycology of the parejasaurian hind limb (1930)

Lieuwe Dirk Boonstra (1905 – 1975) was a South African palaeontologist whose work focused on the mammal-like reptiles of the Middle (Tapinocephalus Assemblage Zone) and Late Permian, whose fossil remains are common in the South African Karoo. He was the author of a large number of papers on Therapsids and Pareiasaurs, and described and revised a number of species.

== Work ==
In 1927 Boonstra was appointed Assistant Palaeontologist of the South African Museum and promoted to Palaeontologist in 1931. He remained at the museum until his retirement in 1972. He was the sole curator of the museum's Karoo vertebrate fossil collection for 45 years.

== Awards ==
He was awarded the Queen Victoria Scholarship by the University of Stellenbosch and received the Havenga prize for Biology from Suid-Afrikaanse Akademie vir Wetenskap en Kuns in 1959.

== Publications ==
Volume 64 of the Annals of the South African Museum (1974) was dedicated to Boonstra. The 88 publications and books he wrote between 1928 and 1969 are listed in it.
