= Prince Albert Local Municipality =

Prince Albert
- Local municipality
- Seal

- Location in the Western Cape
- Coordinates: 33°00′S 22°00′E
- Country: South Africa
- Province: Western Cape
- District: Central Karoo
- Seat: Prince Albert
- Wards: 4

Government
  - Type: Municipal council
  - Mayor: Linda Jaquet (DA)

Area
  - Total: 8,153 km^{2} (3,148 sq mi)

Population (2022)
  - Total: 17,836
  - Density: 2.188/km^{2} (5.666/sq mi)

Racial makeup (2022
  - Black African: 1.7%
  - Coloured: 89.5%
  - Indian/Asian: 0.1%
  - White: 7.0%

First languages (2011)
  - Afrikaans: 93.5%
  - English: 3.6%
  - Other: 2.9%
- Time zone: UTC+2 (SAST)
- Municipal code: WC052

Prince Albert Municipality (Afrikaans: Prins Albert Munisipaliteit) is a local municipality located in the Western Cape province of South Africa.

== History ==
At the end of the apartheid era, the area that is today the Prince Albert Local Municipality formed part of the Central Karoo Regional Services Council (RSC). The town of Prince Albert was governed by a municipal council elected by the white residents, while the coloured residents were governed by a management committee subordinate to the white council. Bitterwater (Leeu-Gamka) was also governed by a management committee subordinate to the RSC.

After the national elections of 1994 a process of local government transformation began, in which negotiations were held between the existing local authorities, political parties, and local community organisations. As a result of these negotiations, in January 1995 the municipality and management committee of Prince Albert were both dissolved and the Prince Albert Transitional Local Council (TLC) was created to replace them. In the same month the Bitterwater management committee was also replaced by the Leeu-Gamka TLC.

The TLCs were initially made up of members nominated by the various parties to the negotiations, until May 1996 when elections were held. At the time of these elections the Central Karoo District Council was established in place of the Central Karoo RSC, and transitional representative councils (TRCs) were elected to represent rural areas outside the TLCs on the District Council. The area that was to become Prince Albert Local Municipality was covered by the Prince Albert TRC.

At the local elections of December 2000 the TLCs and TRC were all dissolved and the Prince Albert Local Municipality was established as a single local authority. At the same election the Central Karoo District Council was dissolved and replaced by the Central Karoo District Municipality.

== Demographics ==
According to the 2022 South African census, the municipality had a population of 17,836, increasing at an average rate of 3.0% annually from 2011. 89.5% of the population identified as "Coloured," with "Whites" at 8.9%. 1.7% of the population identified as "Black African."

== Politics ==
The municipal council consists of ten members elected by mixed-member proportional representation. Five councillors are elected by first-past-the-post voting in five wards, while the remaining five are chosen from party lists so that the total number of party representatives is proportional to the number of votes received.

In the election of 4 November 2026 no party obtained a majority of seats.

The following table shows the results of the 2026 election.

Party	Ward			List			Total seats
Party	Votes	%	Seats	Votes	%	Seats	Total seats
Patriotic Alliance	2,996	48.99	4	2,995	48.96	1	5
Democratic Alliance	2,241	36.65	1	2,275	37.19	3	4
African National Congress	407	6.66	0	409	6.69	1	1
7 other parties	471	7.70	0	438	7.16	0	0
Total	6,115	100.00	5	6,117	100.00	5	10
Valid votes	6,115	99.06		6,117	99.24		
Invalid/blank votes	58	0.94		47	0.76		
Total votes	6,173	100.00		6,164	100.00		
Registered voters/turnout	8,734	70.68		8,734	70.57		
