= Capitanian =

Seventh stage of the Permian geologic period

- 264.28 ± 0.16 – 259.51 ± 0.21 Ma
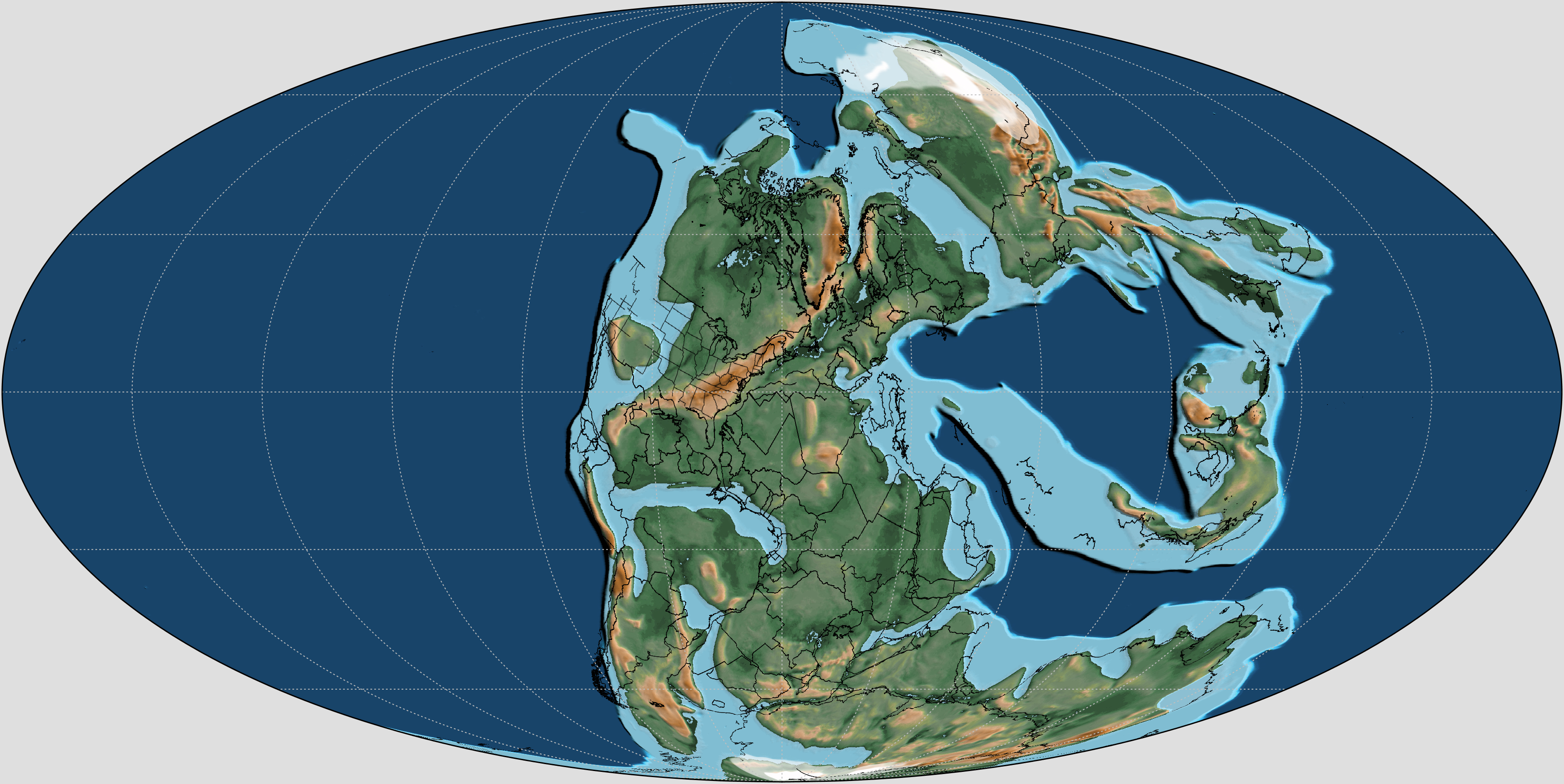
- Mollweide map of Earth 260 million years ago, with black outlines depicting countries in their locations

Chronology
← / Permian-Triassic mass extinction event; ← / end-Capitanian extinction event; ← / Olson's Extinction
Subdivision of the Permian according to the ICS, as of 2023. Vertical axis scale: Millions of years ago

Etymology
- Name formality: Formal

Usage information
- Celestial body: Earth
- Regional usage: Global (ICS)
- Time scale(s) used: ICS Time Scale

Definition
- Chronological unit: Age
- Stratigraphic unit: Stage
- Time span formality: Formal
- Lower boundary definition: FAD of the Conodont Jinogondolella postserrata
- Lower boundary GSSP: Nipple Hill, Guadalupe Mountains, Texas, USA; 31.9091°N 104.7892°W
- Lower GSSP ratified: 2001
- Upper boundary definition: FAD of the Conodont Clarkina postbitteri postbitteri
- Upper boundary GSSP: Penglaitan Section, Laibin, Guangxi, China; 23.6953°N 109.3211°E
- Upper GSSP ratified: 2004

In the geologic timescale, the Capitanian is an age or stage of the Permian. It is also the uppermost or latest of three subdivisions of the Guadalupian Epoch or Series. The Capitanian lasted between 264.28 and 259.51 million years ago. It was preceded by the Wordian and followed by the Wuchiapingian.

A significant mass extinction event occurred at the end of this stage, which was associated with anoxia and acidification in the oceans and possibly caused by the volcanic eruptions that produced the Emeishan Traps. This extinction event may be related to the much larger Permian–Triassic extinction event that followed about 10 million years later.

== Stratigraphy ==
The Capitanian Stage was introduced into scientific literature by George Burr Richardson in 1904. The name comes from the Capitan Reef in the Guadalupe Mountains (Texas, United States). The Capitanian was first used as a stratigraphic subdivision of the Guadalupian in 1961, when both names were still only used regionally in the southern US. The stage was added to the internationally used ICS timescale in 2001.

=== Definitions ===
The base of the Capitanian Stage is defined as the place in the stratigraphic record where fossils of conodont species Jinogondolella postserrata first appear. The global reference profile for this stratigraphic boundary is located at Nipple Hill in the southern Guadalupe Mountains of Texas.

The top of the Capitanian (the base of the Wuchiapingian and Lopingian series) is defined as the place in the stratigraphic record where the conodont species Clarkina postbitteri postbitteri first appears.

The Capitanian Stage was part of the time in which the Zechstein was deposited in Europe. It is coeval with the old European regional Saxonian Stage. In the eastern Tethys domain, the Capitanian overlaps the regional Murgabian Stage, the Midian Stage and the lower part of the Laibinian Stage. In Russia the Capitanian equals the lower part of the regional Severodvinian Stage.

=== Biostratigraphy ===
The Capitanian contains one ammonite biozone (Timorites) and three conodont biozones:

- zone of Clarkina postbitteri hongshuiensis
- zone of Jinogondolella altudaensis
- zone of Jinogondolella postserrata

Larger fusulinid species permit a division in two biozones:

- zone of Rausserella
- zone of Afganella schenki

== Capitanian life ==
Olson’s Extinction, in the early Guadalupian (Roadian, Wordian), led to an extended period of low diversity when worldwide two-thirds of terrestrial vertebrate life was lost. Global diversity rose dramatically in the Capitanian, probably the result of disaster taxa filling empty guilds, only to fall again when the end-Guadalupian event caused a diversity drop in the Wuchiapingian.

== Notable formations ==
- Capitan Formation (New Mexico, Texas, USA)

== Events ==
Carbon isotopes in marine limestone from the Capitanian age show an increase in δ^{13}C values. The change in carbon isotopes in the sea water reflects cooling of global climates.

This climatic cooling may have caused the end-Capitanian extinction event among species that lived in warm water, like larger fusulinids (Verbeekninidae), large bivalves (Alatoconchidae) and rugose corals, and Waagenophyllidae.
