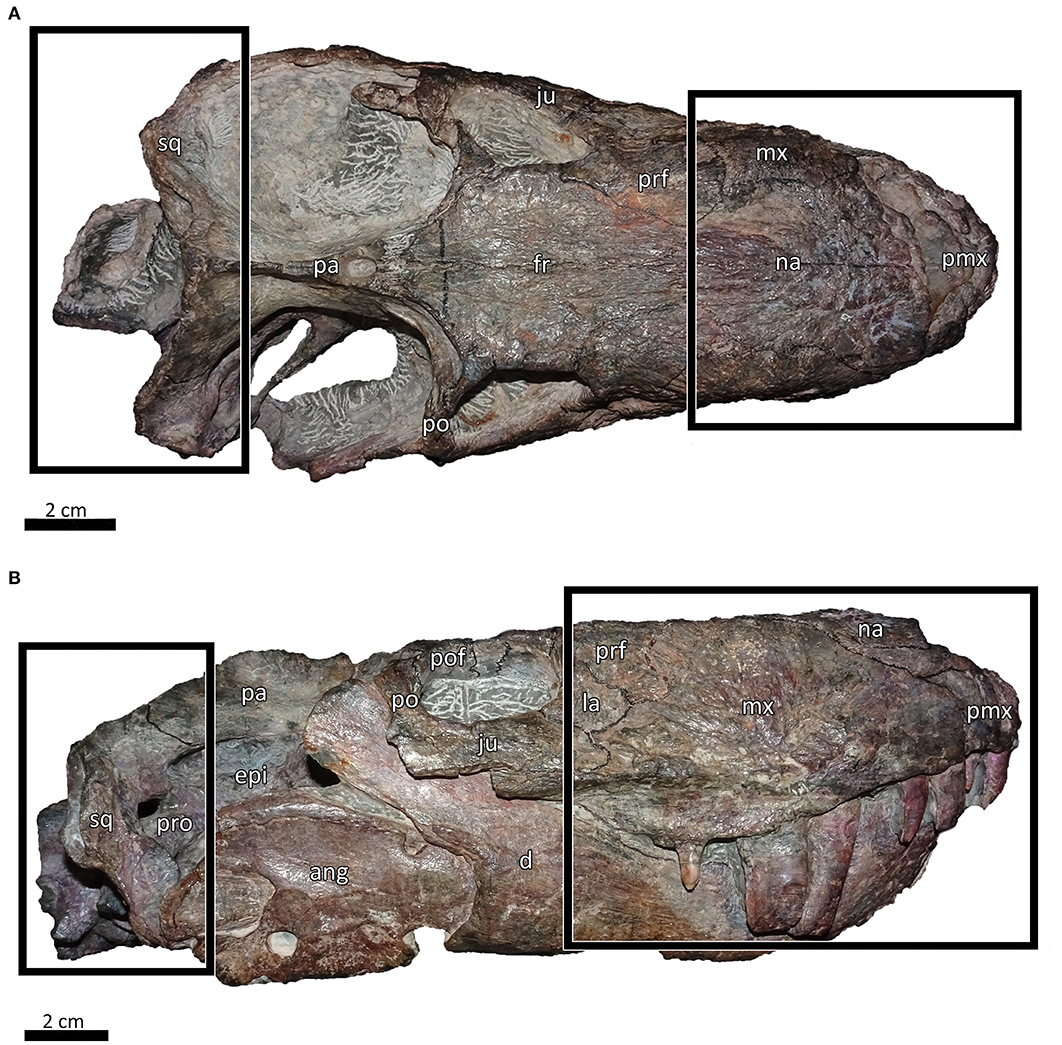
- Above and side view of the near complete holotype skull (US D173)

Scientific classification
- Kingdom: Animalia
- Phylum: Chordata
- Clade: Synapsida
- Clade: Therapsida
- Clade: †Therocephalia
- Family: †Lycosuchidae
- Genus: †Lycosuchus; Broom, 1903
- Species: †L. vanderrieti

Binomial name
- †Lycosuchus vanderrieti Broom, 1903

= Lycosuchus =

Lycosuchus Temporal range: Middle-Late Permian (Capitanian-Wuchiapingian), ~260–258 Ma

Extinct genus of therapsids from the middle Permian of South Africa

Lycosuchus (meaning "wolf crocodile") is a genus of early therocephalian (an extinct type of therapsid, the group that modern mammals belong to) that lived roughly 260–258 million years ago, straddling the boundary of the Middle and Late Permian period, from what is now South Africa. The type and only species is L. vanderrieti, first described in 1903 by Robert Broom from a nearly complete skull discovered in the Karoo Supergroup. Additional specimens of the same taxon, with a more or less comparable degree of preservation, were later reported, allowing for a better description of the palate and even its internal endocranial anatomy. Two additional species were proposed, but the nature of the fossils on which they are based is considered doubtful. Recognised Lycosuchus fossils are known from the uppermost Abrahamskraal and lowest Teekloof Formations, corresponding to the Tapinocephalus and Endothiodon faunal assemblage zones.

With a skull ranging from 23 cm (9.1 in) to almost 30 cm (12 in) long, Lycosuchus was a large therocephalian but still relatively mid-size compared to some other early therocephalians. Like other early therocephalians, it resembles a gorgonopsian with large incisors and its sabre-like canines, though its snout is relatively shorter and broader than other early therocephalians, with even fewer teeth behind the canines. Historically, Lycosuchus was thought to bear not one but two pairs of functioning canines in its upper jaws, unlike other therapsids. However, it has since been recognised that the two pairs instead represent the overlap of alternating replacement teeth (the pattern seen in other predatory therapsids), caught in fossilisation as one pair replaced the other. However, the pattern of replacement still seems to be unusual in Lycosuchus, as overlap between both pairs occurs much more frequently compared to typical therapsids (where this condition is rarely preserved).

Lycosuchus forms the basis of the family Lycosuchidae and is a distinct lineage from most other early therocephalians (most of which belong to the family Scylacosauridae). It is one of the earliest evolutionarily branching members of Therocephalia, a group of stem mammals with a diverse range of anatomy and diets. Early therocephalians were typically large carnivores, exemplified by Lycosuchus with its gorgonopsian-like teeth and a relatively robust snout and jaws, more so than other early therocephalians. Lycosuchus survived a mass extinction at the end of the Middle Permian that saw the extinction of most other large therocephalians (including its close relative Simorhinella and most scylacosaurids), as well as larger therapsid carnivores like Anteosaurus. Lycosuchus is the last known lycosuchid in the fossil record, and it may have competed with large gorgonopsians (such as Gorgonops) as the ecosystem recovered before it went extinct.

== Research history ==
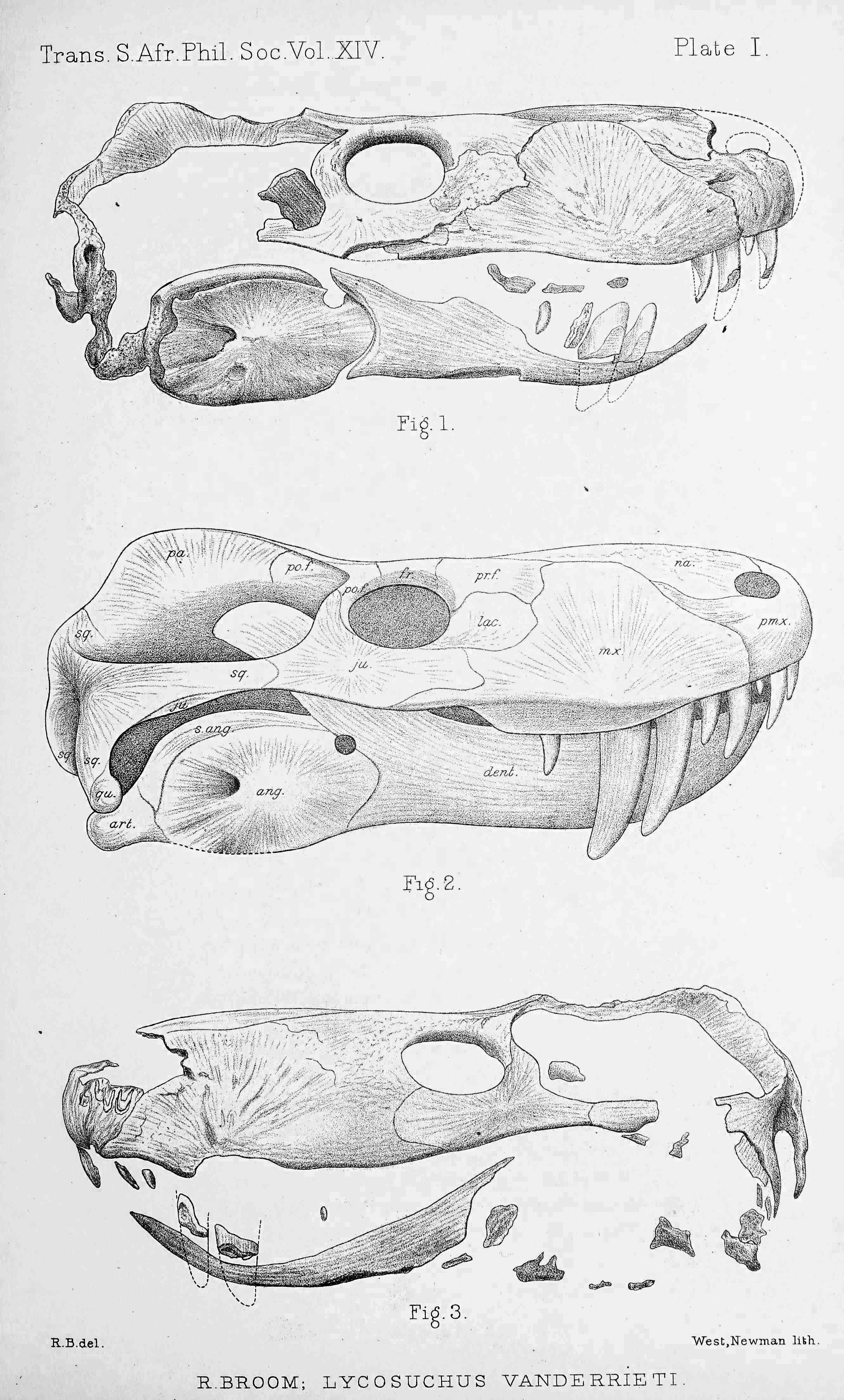
Broom's original illustrations (top, bottom) and reconstruction (middle) of the holotype skull of L.vanderrieti from his first 1903 description

Sometime before 1902, Reverend van der Merwe collected a relatively complete skull from the fossil-bearing deposits of the Karoo Supergroup in South Africa, before donating it to Victoria College in Stellenbosch. Some time later, the specimen was examined in detail by Robert Broom, who described it as representing a new genus and species of theriodont, Lycosuchus vanderrieti. The generic name Lycosuchus is derived from the Ancient Greek λύκος (lýkos, "wolf") and σοῦχος (souchos, "crocodile"), while the specific name vanderrieti honours Professor van der Riet, who loaned the skull to Broom for study. Broom initially described the animal in a paper first read at a meeting of the Philosophical Society of South Africa on November 26th 1902, before it was formally published by the society in 1903. Subsequently, when Victoria College attained university status and became Stellenbosch University, the holotype skull of this taxon was retained there under the catalogue number US D173.

The location where the fossil was discovered was only vaguely described by van der Merwe as the "Groot Vlakte between Prince Albert, Beaufort West and Willowmore". This area exposes layers of rock strata from both the Abrahamskraal Formation and the lowest member of the overlying Teekloof Formation (the Poortjie Member), which approximately corresponds to the Tapinocephalus Assemblage Zone (AZ) and the lower portion of the Endothiodon AZ biozones, respectively. Indeed, fossils of Lycosuchus are so characteristic of the base of the latter assemblage that it was formally defined as the Lycosuchus-Eunotosaurus Subzone (SZ) in 2020. Although the exact origin of the holotype from this relatively broad stratigraphic range is not known, it is consistent with the range bounded by the highest and lowest records of subsequent Lycosuchus specimens.

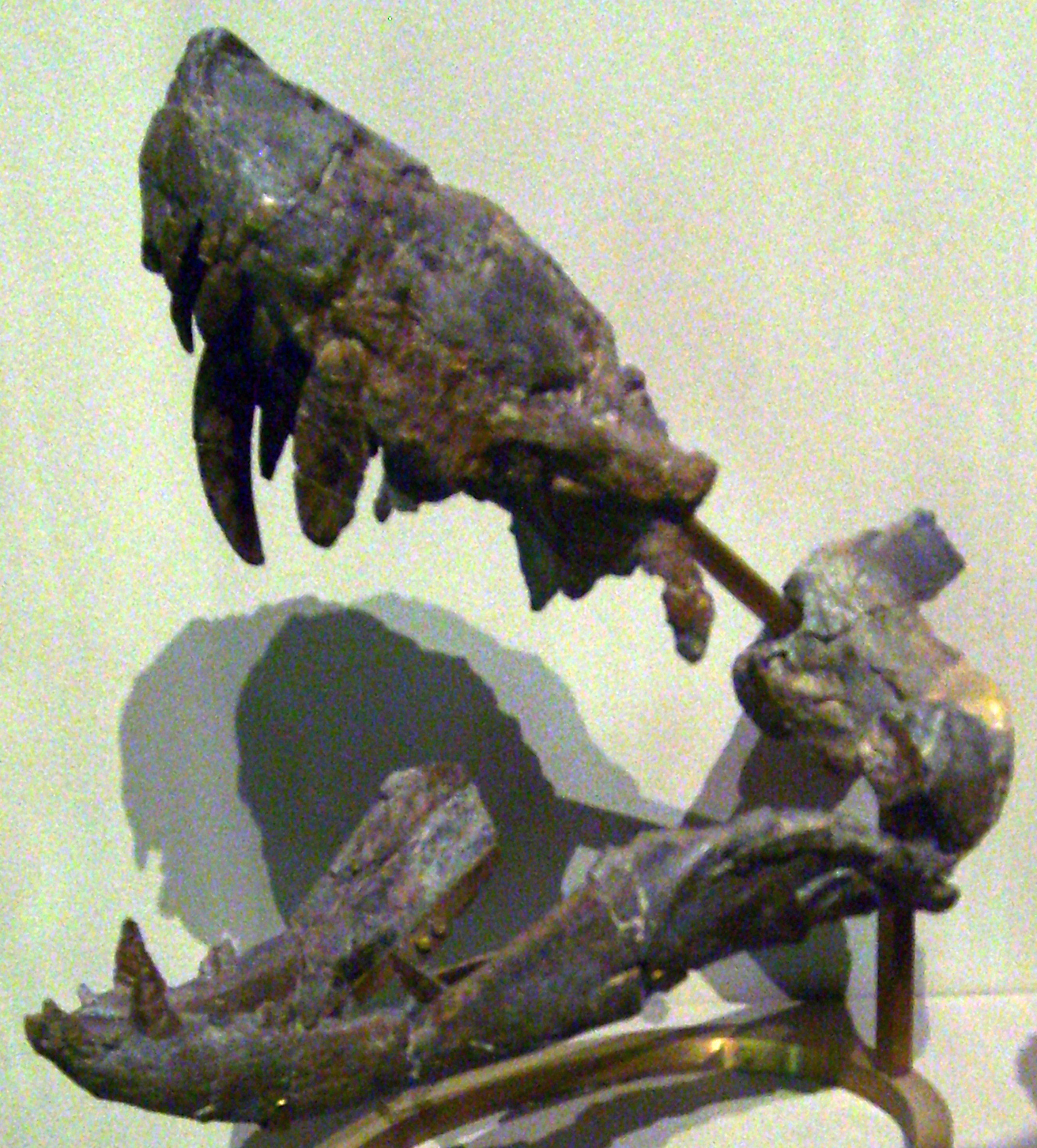
L. vanderrieti partial skull (MB.R.995) at the Museum für Naturkunde, Berlin, Germany

Following the description of the holotype, additional specimens of L. vanderrieti were discovered in the Karoo Supergroup, bringing the total number of currently recognized fossils to five. In 1929, Werner Janensch discovered at Letjesbosch, near Beaufort West, an incomplete skull consisting of an isolated but nearly complete lower jaw, associated with a portion of the snout and a braincase. He assigned it to Lycosuchus sp. in his 1952 brief description. This specimen is now housed under the number MB.R.995 in the fossil reptile collections of the Museum für Naturkunde, Berlin, Germany, and has been subsequently reassigned to the type species in the few later studies in which it is mentioned. It was ultimately described in detail in two studies led by Luisa C. Pusch, published in 2020 and 2024. Using micro-CT scans on this material, these studies have made it possible to examine the internal anatomy of the brain, snout, and dentition, providing new insights into the structure of the inner ear, the innervation of the snout, and the process of tooth replacement, while also enhancing phylogenetic analyses through the inclusion of characters derived from internal cranial anatomy.

Two specimens are housed at the Council for Geoscience in Pretoria, South Africa, under the numbers CGS MJF 68 and CGS M793. The latter, discovered by A. Chuma, has been regarded as one of the best preserved specimens of Lycosuchus, with the bones of the palate and braincase being mostly intact and better exposed compared to other specimens (though the superficial bones of the snout are badly weathered). This specimen was extensively described by Jurgens van den Heever in his 1987 PhD thesis, and in a later paper published in 1994. The largest known specimen of Lycosuchus is housed at the Evolutionary Studies Institute (formerly the Bernard Price Institute) of the University of the Witwatersrand in Johannesburg, under the catalogue number BP/1/7162. Other specimens of Lycosuchus at the Evolutionary Studies Institute were listed by both Jennifer Botha and colleagues and Fernando Abdala in 2007: BP/1/276, BP/1/499, BP/1/1100 and BP/1/1768. However, of these specimens BP/1/276 and 1768 have since been identified as Pristerognathus and BP/1/1000 as Glanosuchus instead, and none are recognised as Lycosuchus.

CGS M793 is the stratigraphically highest (and therefore the youngest) occurrence of Lycosuchus in the fossil record, coming from the Drie Kop 396 farm in the uppermost Poortjie Member (uppermost Lycosuchus-Eunotosaurus SZ of the Endothiodon AZ). By contrast, the stratigraphically lowest specimens are CGS MJF 68 and BP/1/7162. The former was discovered on the Uitzigt 171 farm to the north of Victoria West in the uppermost Abrahamskraal Formation. BP/1/7162 was discovered on the Hilary farm in Jansenville of the Eastern Cape Province. Historically, the equivalent strata from the Eastern Cape was regarded as a separate formation, the Koonap Formation, but it has recently been incorporated into the Abrahamskraal Formation. Both localities correspond to the uppermost Tapinocephalus AZ, defined as the Diictodon-Styracocephalus SZ. These lowest localities are stratigraphically close to the boundary of—and therefore can only be slightly older than—the Capitanian mass extinction event between the Abrahamskraal and Teekloof formations, which is radiometrically dated to approximately 260.259 ± 0.081 million years ago. The upper boundary of the Eunotosaurus-Lycosuchus SZ—and so the last occurrence of Lycosuchus—is less precisely constrained, but is thought to be between 259 and 258 million years ago. This range therefore also crosses the Guadalupian/Lopingian boundary (i.e. from the middle to the late Permian), which is accepted as 259.51 ± 0.21 million years ago by the International Commission on Stratigraphy as of December 2024.

=== Proposed and formerly classified species ===
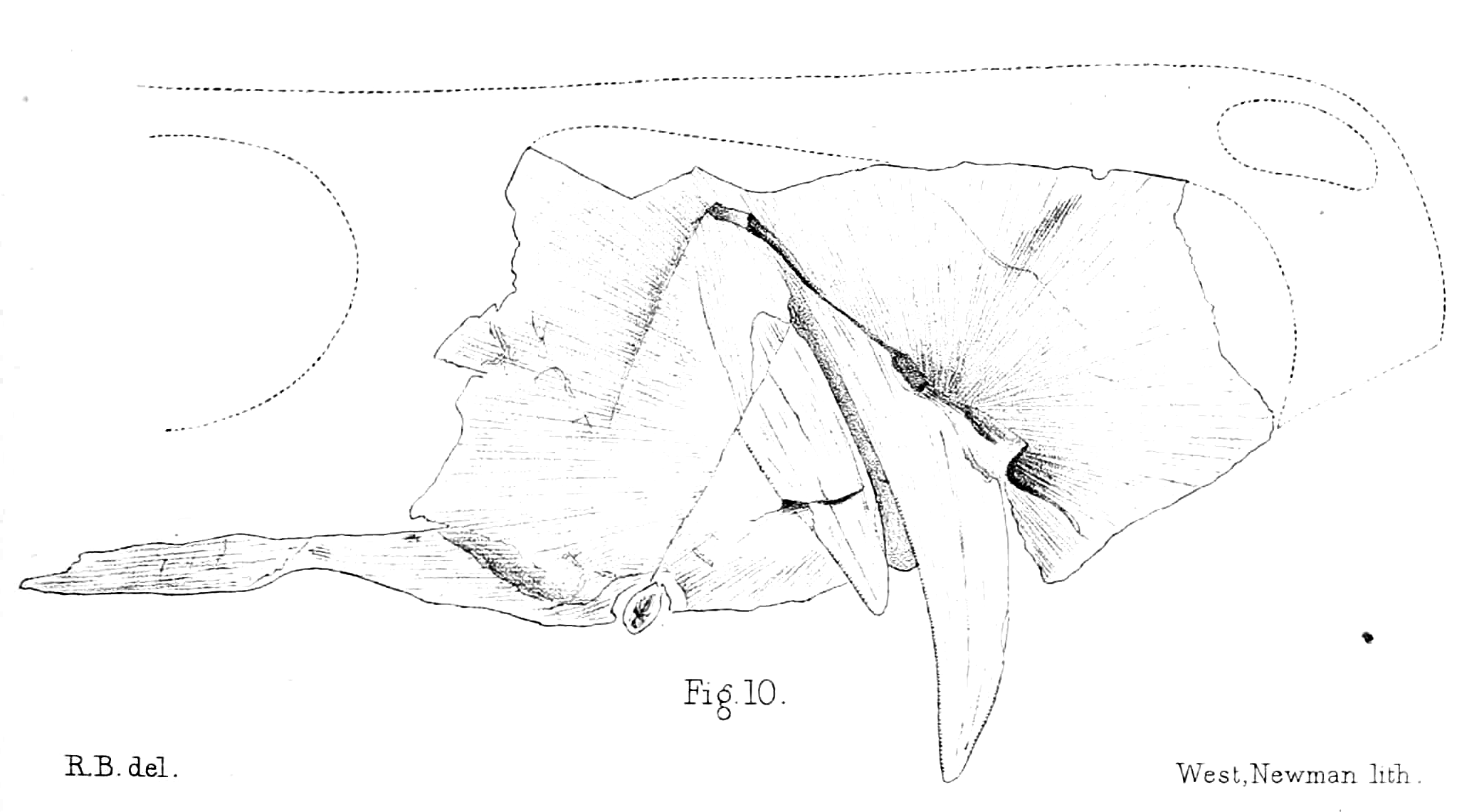
Broom's illustration of the holotype of the dubious species L. mackayi, which likely represents a gorgonopsian maxilla

Although currently considered monospecific, additional species of Lycosuchus were proposed by researchers in the 20th century. In his third paper from 1903, Broom named the new species L. mackayi from a poorly preserved maxilla discovered some years earlier by Mr. G. Mackay. Broom assigned the specimen to Lycosuchus based on a similar pattern of dentition to the holotype (two concurrent canines and a single small postcanine), but justified erecting a second species due to it being larger than the holotype of L. vanderrieti yet presumed to be less mature. This was based on the second (and the assumed permanent) canine being smaller (i.e. from a younger animal) in this specimen, which has since been recognised as a typical part of the alternating theriodont canine replacement pattern and not indicative of age. The specimen otherwise lacks diagnostic features and so L. mackayi is now regarded as a nomen dubium. The specimen itself was re-identified only as Theriodontia incertae sedis at first by van Den Heever in 1987. However, as it comes from a stratigraphic position above the range of large early therocephalians (based on the specimen's direct association with a specimen of the dicynodont Oudenodon) (Note: Oudenodon is not known from below the uppermost Tropidostoma-Gorgonops Subzone of the Endothiodon Assemblage Zone, whilst early therocephalians like Lycosuchus disappear from the fossil record at the top of the preceding Lycosuchus-Eunotosaurus Subzone.) and because the postcanine is tilted back somewhat, it most likely belongs to a gorgonopsian.

Van den Heever himself also proposed a new species of Lycosuchus in his 1987 thesis, "L. keyseri". This taxon was based upon CGS C60, a partial snout and dentary collected by and proposed to be named after Dr. Andre W. Keyser. CGS C60 is well preserved, including much of the internal anatomy of the skull, and it contributed extensively to van den Heever's description of lycosuchid skull anatomy. He proposed that it belonged to a new species owing to the absence of a ventral maxillary flange that he considered diagnostic for L. vanderrieti. However, when the descriptive part of his thesis based upon CGS C60 was later formally published in 1994, he refrained from naming "L. keyseri" and instead only referred to the specimen as a lycosuchid. Consequently, "L. keyseri" was never established as a valid species and so the name is a nomen nudum. The specimen itself is currently considered to be Lycosuchidae incertae sedis.

== Description ==
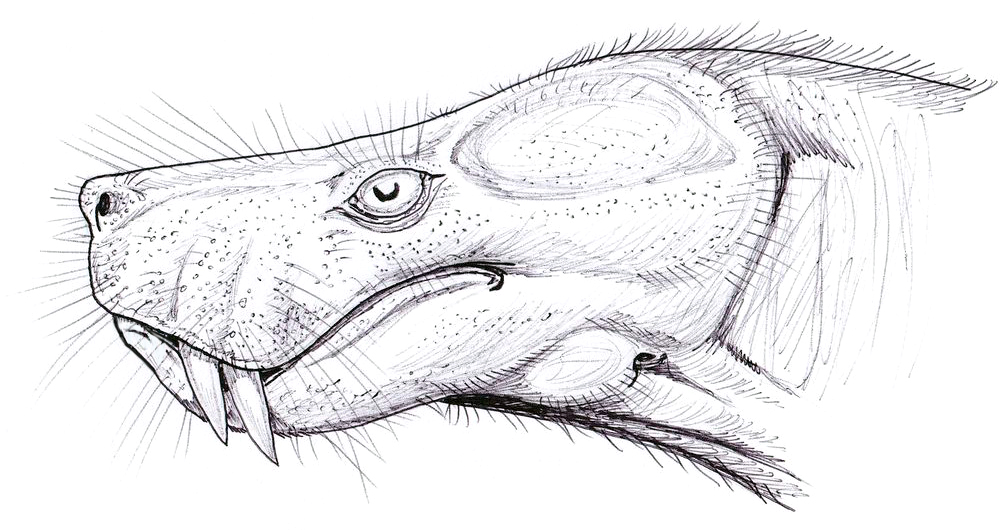
Artist's interpretation of Lycosuchus in life with exposed canines and hypothetical hair

Lycosuchus is a large therocephalian, with the holotype skull measuring 23.2 cm (9.1 in) long and the largest measured skull BP/1/7162 at 29.8 cm (11.7 in) long. This is relatively mid-sized compared to other lycosuchids, however, and it is surpassed in size by several other lycosuchid specimens, including a mature Simorhinella at 37 cm (15 in) long.

Lycosuchus exemplifies the typical anatomy and proportions of lycosuchids. The snout is short—only half or slightly less of the skull's whole length—and relatively low and broad. The orbits (eye sockets) are large and broadly spaced across the skull and bordered by the deep jugal bone below. The temporal fenestra are large and spacious, bordered by straight zygomatic arches as viewed from above and the parietal bones drawn into a narrow sagittal crest between them. The height of the sagittal crest is unknown due to weathering, though it is typically considered to be unelevated and level with the roof of the skull (although Broom's original reconstruction depicts the holotype with a low sagittal crest). Compared with its close relative Simorhinella, the crest is much narrower and pinches in behind the pineal foramen (the opening of the parietal, or "third" eye), which is itself well developed. It otherwise only differs from Simorhinella in details of the palate inside the mouth.

=== Snout and skull roof ===
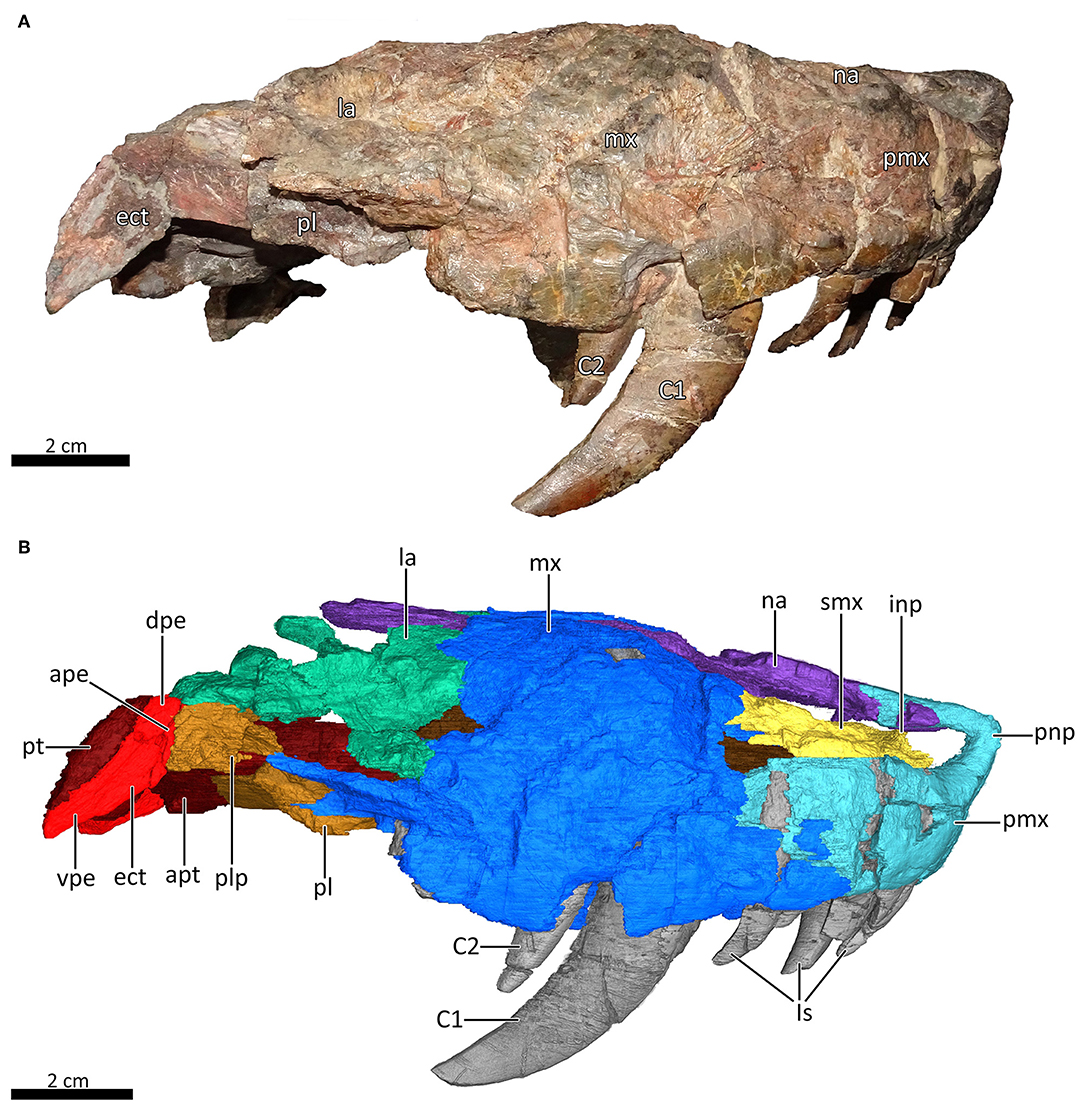
Photograph and digital model of the right snout of Lycosuchus MB.R.995

The broad, low snout of Lycosuchus mostly comprises the tooth-bearing maxilla on each side and is roofed by the broad and relatively flat nasal bones. Unusually, its proportions mean that the nasals largely aren't visible from the side. The premaxilla at the front is overlapped by the maxilla over the fifth and even fourth incisors. The tip of the premaxilla slopes up from the front teeth and projects forward as thin nasal process that sharply hooks back to join the nasals and divide the external nares (nostril openings). The bones of the snout have a rough texture of fine ridges and grooves, especially so over the root of the canines, suggesting a tight, possibly keratinised skin that fit close to the bone. The bone around the nostrils is smooth, however, suggesting fleshier tissues existed over the nose.

A thin, plate-like flange of bone along the bottom of the maxilla housing the postcanine teeth is characteristic of Lycosuchus. This ventral maxillary flange is smoother than the rest of the snout and slightly inset from it. It is divided from the rest of the snout by a horizontal ridge that extends forwards from the base of the jugal and runs across the maxilla. In 1903, Broom proposed that the smooth and somewhat inset flange supported thicker and fleshier tissues than the rest of the snout, such as a muscular lip.

Broom initially believed that the nasals were partially fused, and combined with their rough texture he argued therefore that they supported a "considerable" boss of horn. However, the nasals are indeed separate and paired and its surface was unlikely to be different from the rest of the snout. The roof of the skull, mostly made up of the frontal bones, is broad and slightly concave with raised rims above the orbit along the edges of the prefrontal, frontal and postfrontal bones. The orbital rims are somewhat rugose in larger specimens, especially so on the postfrontal.

=== Palate and mandibles ===
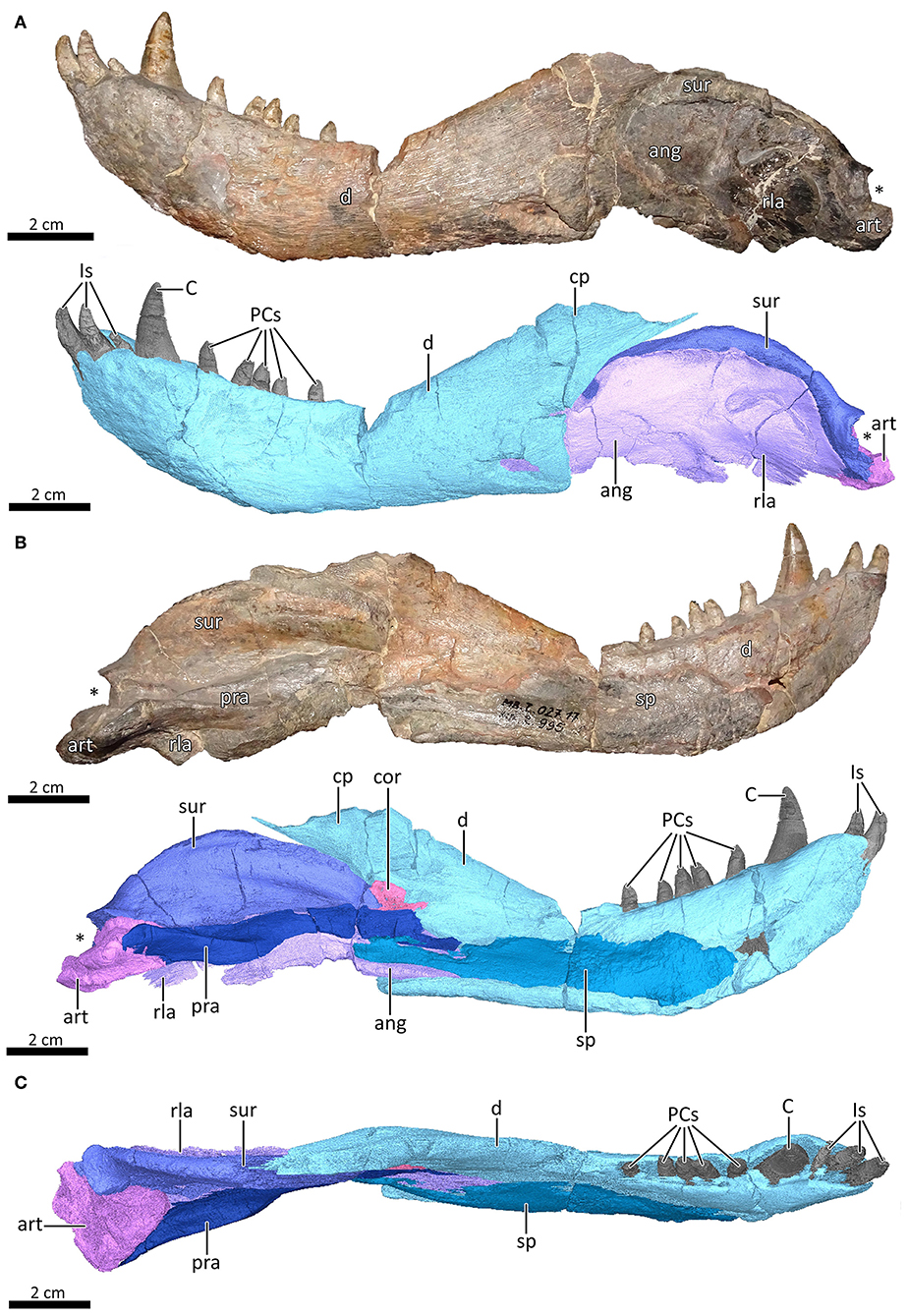
The left mandible of Lycosuchus MB.R.995

While Lycosuchus is superficially very similar to its close relative Simorhinella, it is readily distinguished by the structure of the palatal bones roofing the mouth (a true secondary palate as in mammals, however, is not present). Where the paired vomers narrow into a strut between the two internal nostrils (choanae), they form a vaulted arch in Lycosuchus without the midline crest seen in Simorhinella. Another difference is in the margins of the interpterygoid vacuity (a cavity in between the two pterygoid bones, which sit directly behind the vomer). In Lycosuchus the rims of the vacuity are raised into thin walls that are directed ventrolaterally (down and outwards), compared to ventrally directed in Simorhinella. The transverse processes of the pterygoids bear a row of up to three or four well developed palatal teeth, while the pterygoid boss in front of each is toothless (the opposite of scylacosaurids). Compared to Simorhinella, the palatal bosses of Lycosuchus have a more elongated shape.

The lower jaws of Lycosuchus are typical of early therocephalians. The dentary bone (the frontmost, tooth-bearing bone of the mandible) is large, with a straight edge along the bottom, a loosely attached and gently sloping mandibular symphysis where they meet at the tip, a large coronoid process at the back for muscle attachment and a well developed dentary angle (a distinct corner at its bottom rear edge). The angular bone has a large reflected lamina (a thin, plate-like sheet of bone projecting from the angular of non-mammalian therapsids), with the typical therocephalian pattern of five ridges separating shallow depressions and a notch in the top rear edge of the lamina.

=== Teeth ===
The upper dentition of Lycosuchus consistently include only five incisors in each premaxilla, a pair of large canines, and only few much smaller postcanines (varying between two or three). All the teeth are sharp and serrated on both their front and rear edges. Most specimens exhibit the "double canine" condition originally thought to typify lycosuchids. "Double canines" were historically interpreted as two simultaneously functional pairs, however they have since been recognised as overlapping generations of old and newer replacement canines alternating between tooth sockets (alveoli). This alternating mode of replacement, where the canine swaps between a tooth socket in front and behind, is common among predatory therapsids (such as gorgonopsians), though replacement canines co-occur with the functional predecessor much more often in lycosuchids than in other therapsids. The canines themselves are proportionately large, approaching the "sabre-tooth" condition often described for gorgonopsians.

On each side of the mandible, the lower dentition comprises three incisors, a single large canine, and around five postcanines, all serrated as in the upper dentition. Unlike the upper jaw, there is only one pair of lower canines present at a time, and its replacement erupts directly from the same position rather than alternating. The lower canines, while prominent, are not as large as their upper counterparts. There are more postcanines in the lower jaw than the upper, (e.g. five compared to two or three in MB.R.995), and though the lower postcanines are larger than the upper teeth they are still only modest. The postcanines oppose a rugose region of the palatine bones running parallel to the edge of the maxilla on the roof of the mouth. These areas may have been covered with a pad of horn or other tough tissue, and the lower postcanines may have bitten against it.

=== Endocranial ===
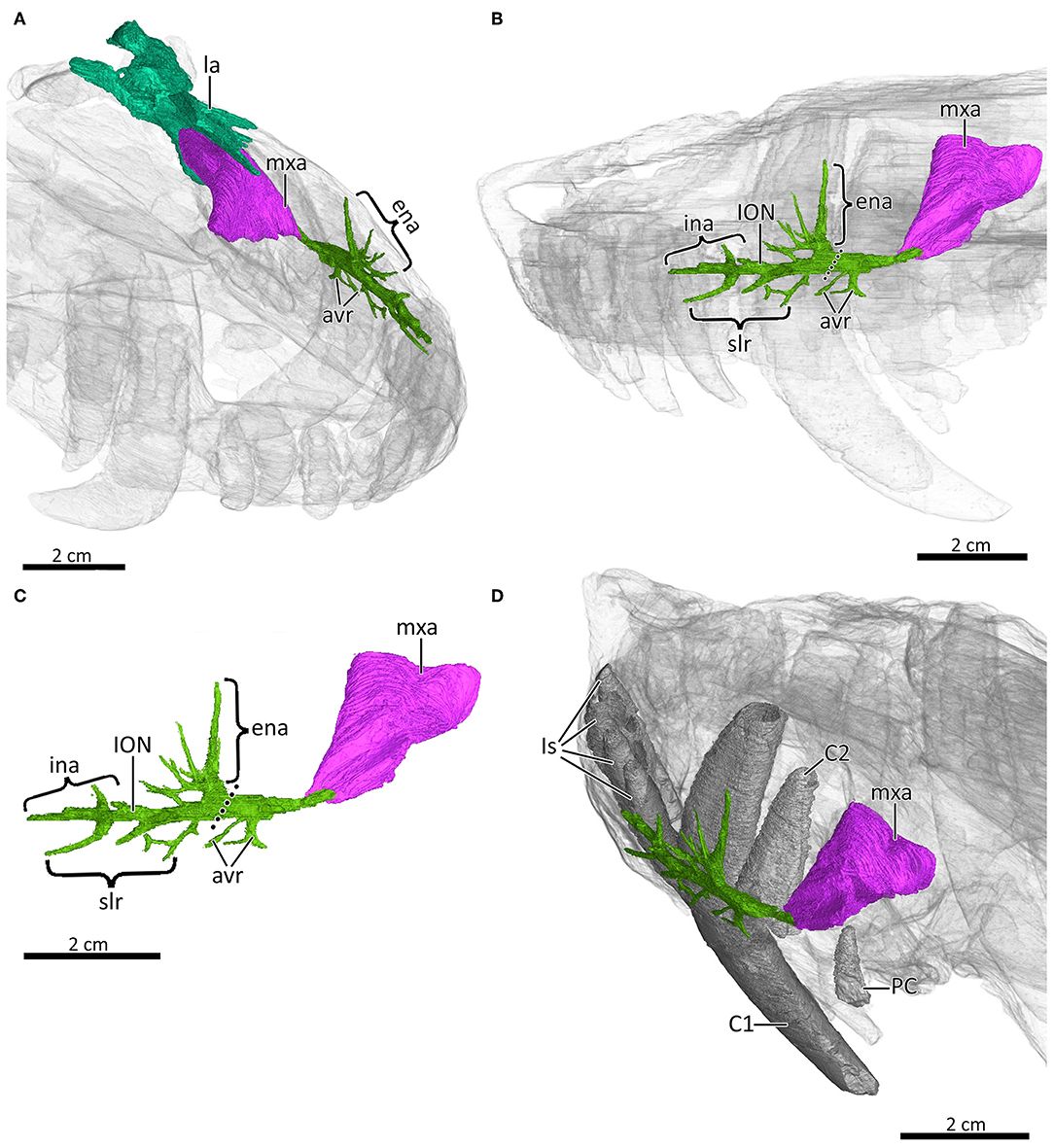
Digital reconstruction of the maxillary canal (green) and maxillary antrum (pink) of Lycosuchus MB.R.995

The first descriptions of the endocranial anatomy were made by Broom in 1903, who observed that there was no opening for the infraorbital nerve (the infraorbital canal or foramen), as found in mammals, visible on the holotype. He believed that the infraorbital foramen was likely to be on the damaged ventral maxillary flange below the ridge, rather than recognising its absence altogether. From this, he bolstered his suggestion that only the flange supported a mammal-like fleshy lip and that the rest of the snout supported a covering of skin closer to the bone, like reptiles. In fact, its absence corresponds to the ancestral condition of the infraorbital nerve being contained entirely within a bony maxillary canal (a passage for a branch of the trigeminal nerve and blood vessels through the maxilla). This is typical of reptiles and non-mammalian synapsids, while an infraorbital foramen is a feature of derived cynodonts (including mammals) from which the infraorbital nerve emerges into the tissues of the snout.

The complete internal anatomy of the nerves in the snout was only realised through CT-scanning of specimen MB.R.995 in the 21st century. The maxillary canal begins just behind the canines, with a pair of alveolar nerves branching off towards the teeth. The region of the canal ahead of this point (homologous to the infraorbital nerve in modern mammals) then splits into three main branches (rami), two narial rami (external and internal) and a labial ramus, with each splitting into further branching arrays of nerves. The external nasal ramus is notable for its unusually vertical orientation, and it is highly ramified into numerous radiating branches. The latter trait is primitive to both therocephalians and cynodonts, with the nerve being shorter and less ramified in derived members of each clade.

The bony labyrinth of the inner ear is unusual, as the longest of the three semicircular canals is the lateral canal, followed by the anterior (front), and the smaller posterior canal. The anterior canal is usually the longest in therapsids (and most other terrestrial vertebrates), and among fossil therapsids a long lateral canal has only also been reported in the burrowing dicynodont Kawingasaurus. Lycosuchus also has a cochlear recess, a precursor to the elongated, coiled cochlea of modern mammals. A cochlear recess is typical of cynodonts but not of most other therocephalians and even most other therapsids. Indeed, the only other therocephalian identified with a cochlear recess is the derived baurioid Microgomphodon, and it is known to be absent in other eutherocephalians.

== Classification ==
When Broom described Lycosuchus in 1903, the taxonomy of "mammal-like reptiles" was rudimentary at the time. The genus was therefore placed rather imprecisely within Theriodontia, alongside forms such as Cynognathus, Lycosaurus, and Ictidosuchus. Broom recognised four distinct subgroups, divisible into two primitive subgroups (represented by Lycosaurus and Ictidosuchus) and two advanced (represented by Cynognathus and Gomphognathus). He identified Lycosuchus as a member of the primitive forms, while noting that it shows closer affinities to Ictidosuchus than to Lycosaurus. However, in other respects he believed Lycosuchus to retain more primitive features he associated with anomodonts, and so considered it to be close to a common ancestor of anomodonts and later theriodonts. Broom further suggested that Lycosuchus lay close to the ancestry of monotremes, which he interpreted as having evolved from an ancestor slightly more derived than Lycosuchus, but less advanced than "advanced" forms such as Cynognathus and Gomphognathus. In April of 1903, Broom redefined Theriodontia for the advanced forms, and created the new group Therocephalia for what he had considered the primitive theriodonts. Shortly after erecting this group, he published a follow-up paper in November of the same year in which he explicitly identified Lycosuchus as a therocephalian, albeit of uncertain relationships due to being unable to examine the holotype's palate. In 1905, Broom ultimately grouped all of these "mammal-like reptiles" into a new clade that he named Therapsida.

While initially attaching no particular importance to the "double canines" in Lycosuchus, comparing them instead to the replacement of milk teeth in modern mammals, Broom begins to attribute taxonomic significance to them in two successive papers published in May 1908. The first paper included the descriptions of the therocephalians Trochosuchus and Hyaenasuchus, who had "double canines" similar to Lycosuchus. In the second paper, Broom regarded these three genera as their own "line of descent" amongst early therocephalians, but did not name a family or other subgroup for them. Such a grouping would not be named until 1923 when Baron Franz Nopcsa coined the family Lycosuchidae after Lycosuchus, which it is the type genus. Consequently, the "double-canined" Lycosuchus was often presented as representative of both lycosuchids and early therocephalians as a whole. In 1980, van den Heever challenged the validity of the "double canines" of the lycosuchids, arguing that they simply represented individuals of typical early therocephalians caught during the brief overlap of the alternating functional canine and its replacement at the time of death. This brought into question the taxonomic utility of "double canines" as a lycosuchid characteristic and for their supposed differing proportions between lycosuchid species, and van den Heever argued the family was an artificial collection of "pristerognathid" (scylacosaurid) therocephalians simply undergoing canine replacement.

Subsequently, van den Heever would later revise the entire taxonomy and systematics of early therocephalians in his 1987 PhD thesis, reinstating Lycosuchidae but recognising only Lycosuchus as the sole valid member. Most other lycosuchids were previously only distinguished by variations in tooth count and proportions, and so lacked any clear diagnostic characteristics according to van den Heever and were therefore rendered nomina dubia. However, Hyaenasuchus and Zinnosaurus were complete enough for him to identify traits he considered diagnostic of Lycosuchus vanderrieti and so he concluded they were junior synonyms of it. Hyaenasuchus had previously only been distinguished from Lycosuchus by a greater tooth count and proportions of the canines, while Zinnosaurus was initially identified as a scylacosaurid ("pristerognathid" at the time) due to only preserving a single pair of canines. Although the revised taxonomy from van den Heever's thesis was never formally published, his conclusions were nonetheless largely adopted by palaeontologists in subsequent work into the 21st century. As the only valid lycosuchid, Lycosuchus became representative of the group as a whole in later studies, particularly in phylogenetic analyses of therocephalians. In a 2014 study, Fernando Abdala and colleagues questioned the synonymy of Hyaenasuchus and Zinnosaurus with Lycosuchus, following the reidentification of the therocephalian Simorhinella as a lycosuchid, prompting a re-examination of most other specimens of this group. Lycosuchus and Simorhinella are distinguished only by minor differences in the bones of the palate, but as these elements are obscured in the type specimens of Hyaenasuchus and Zinnosaurus, the authors consider it impossible to determine whether they might belong to either of these genera or another. Consequently, they are no longer regarded as synonyms of Lycosuchus and are now considered as nomina dubia.

Lycosuchus has often been included as a representative of early therocephalians in phylogenetic analyses, where it has consistently been recovered as an early branching member of the group. Indeed, Lycosuchus is often found to be the earliest diverging member and so is considered as the most basal therocephalian currently known. As the only valid lycosuchid known for many years, and due to the fact that Simorhinella has yet to be included in a phylogenetic analysis, Lycosuchus is the only lycosuchid to be analysed cladistically so far. However, on occasion it has been found to form a clade with the Russian therocephalian Gorynychus, although the latter is not typically considered a lycosuchid. This result is not common though, and Gorynychus is more often found in a more derived position closer to scylacosaurids.

All cladograms below are simplified to focus on the relationships of Lycosuchus and early therocephalians, and relationships within bolded terminal clades are not shown.

Liu & Abdala (2019):

- Theriodontia
  - Gorgonopsia
  - Eutheriodontia
    - Cynodontia
      - Charassognathus
      - - Procynosuchus
        - Dvinia
    - Therocephalia
      - - Gorynychus
        - **Lycosuchus**
      - - Scylacosauridae
          - - Pristerognathus
            - Glanosuchus
          - - Scylacosaurus
            - Pardosuchus
            - Ictidosaurus
            - Alopecodon
        - **Eutherocephalia**

Liu & Abdala (2023):

- Theriodontia
  - Gorgonopsia
  - Eutheriodontia
    - Cynodontia
      - Charassognathus
      - - Dvinia
        - Procynosuchus
    - Therocephalia
      - **Lycosuchus**
      - - Gorynychus
        - - Scylacosauridae
            - Alopecodon
            - - Pardosuchus
              - - Scylacosaurus
                - Ictidosaurus
                - - Pristerognathus
                  - Glanosuchus
          - **Eutherocephalia**

A novel result was recovered by Pusch et al. (2024) from an analysis focused on the relationships of early cynodonts. Using a dataset with much more endocranial data than previous studies, they found Lycosuchus and Alopecognathus (representing Scylacosauridae) to be sister taxa in a clade that itself was the sister of another clade made by Eutherocephalia and Cynodontia, rendering Therocephalia paraphyletic. However, this analysis only included four therocephalians, with only Olivierosuchus and Theriognathus representing Eutherocephalia. A simplified cladogram of these results is shown below.

- Theriodontia
  - Cynariops
  - Therocephalia/ Eutheriodontia
    - - **Lycosuchus**
      - Alopecognathus
    - - Eutherocephalia
        - Olivierosuchus
        - Theriognathus
      - Cynodontia
        - Charassognathidae
          - Charassognathus
          - Abdalodon
        - - Dvinia
          - - Procynosuchus
            - **Epicynodontia**

== Palaeobiology ==
The serrated teeth of Lycosuchus indicate it had a carnivorous diet. Its dentition is similar to that of gorgonopsians, being dominated by large canines and with only a few weak postcanines. Its proportionately shorter and more rounded snout has been proposed to both possess more torsional strength (i.e be more resistant to twisting) and could perhaps bite with greater force at the canine compared to scylacosaurids. Broom initially speculated that the supposed two pairs of canines were specialised for different functions, based on the rear pair being more robust and having serrations only on the rear edge, while the anterior pair had them on both. However, these differences reflect imperfect preservation and the different ages of the teeth, with the younger, still erupting replacement pair in front being smaller and having more pristine serrations.

The unusual inner ear morphology of Lycosuchus suggests it was specialised for a particular lifestyle or habit, but it is not known what that would be. Long lateral semi-circular canals are typically associated with burrowing or agility in modern mammals, and it is also found in aquatic non-mammalian tetrapods. Neither burrowing nor aquatic habits are considered likely for Lycosuchus based on the postcrania of other lycosuchids, and so Pusch and colleagues in 2020 suggested it could be associated with an active predatory lifestyle. Pusch and colleagues stressed that the condition of scylacosaurids, which are inferred to have had similar predatory behaviour, would have to be examined to determine if long lateral canals is typical of early therocephalians or unique to Lycosuchus. The inner ear of scylacosaurids has yet to be studied, but in 2024 the inner ears of two derived carnivorous therocephalians (Olivierosuchus and Theriognathus) were modelled and found to have typical lateral semi-circular canals.

=== Canine replacement ===
The "double canines" of Lycosuchus have led to much interest into the nature and pattern of its tooth replacement. Historically, the "double canines" were thought to represent multiple simultaneously functional pairs each occupying their own tooth position. In Lycosuchus and its relatives, this was thought to be a retention of the primitive condition seen in earlier sphenacodont synapsids like Dimetrodon. It has since been recognised that the "double canines" are a product of the pattern of tooth replacement in predatory therapsids (including gorgonopsians, scylacosaurids, and cynodonts).

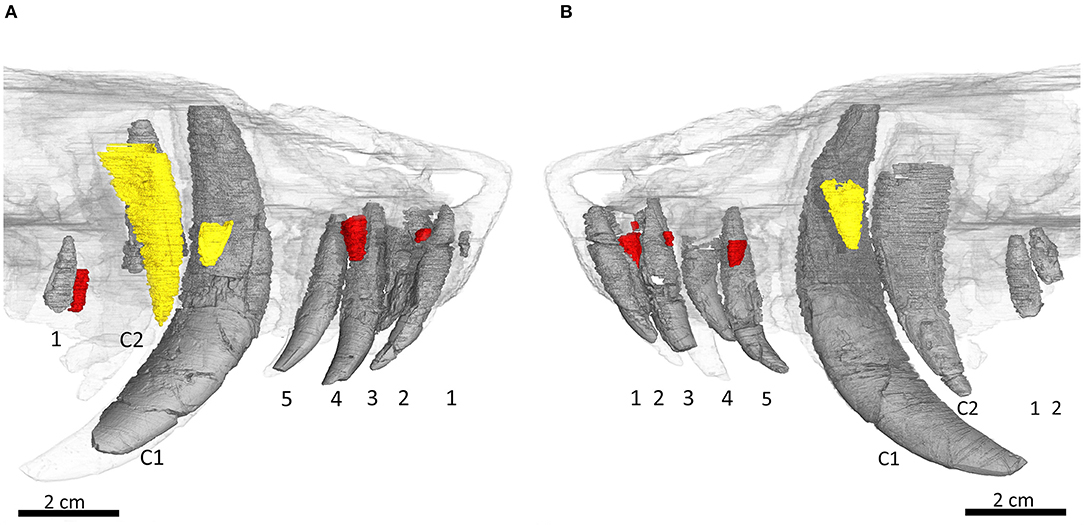
Digital reconstruction of the upper teeth of Lycosuchus MB.R.995 and their replacements

Canine replacement in Lycosuchus broadly follows the same pattern seen in other theriodonts, with the canine alternating between an anterior and posterior alveolus with every replacement. In other predatory therapsids, only one erupted canine is typically present at a time, and the interval of overlap between the alternates is brief. In Lycosuchus, however, the functional canine and its replacement co-occur much more often. Indeed, CT-scanning of MB.R.995 reveals that as a replacement is erupting in the alternate alveolus a direct replacement for the old canine in the original alveolus is already developing before it has even been lost.

The nature of this overlap is not resolved, and different hypotheses have put forward to explain it. In 2014, Abdala and colleagues proposed that Lycosuchus and other lycosuchids may have experienced a much more rapid rate of canine replacement than other therapsids. By replacing the canines more frequently, there are more instances in their lifespan of overlap between pairs than in other therapsids and explaining why they are preserved this way more often. From the CT data of MB.R.995, Pusch and colleagues proposed a contrasting hypothesis in 2020. They suggested that Lycosuchus may have had a more protracted development for its canines, with the older functional pair remaining in place long into the development of the alternate pair, to the point that its direct replacement in the same alveolus begins forming before it is finally lost.

While the notion that Lycosuchus had two independentantly functional sets of canines has been correctly dismissed, Pusch and colleagues suggested that the co-occurring canines in each maxilla may still both have been "functional" at the same time. In other predatory therapsids, the older worn canine falls out before it is functionally replaced by its alternate, so that only a single canine in each upper jaw is functioning at a given time. While second pair of canines in Lycosuchus represent the alternate replacements of the older pair, both pairs were presumably both "functional" while they were both erupted and co-occurring, at least to a degree. The purpose of this arrangement is less clear, as van den Heever argued in 1980 that two closely packed canines acting as a single unit would impede the efficiency to both penetrate and tear flesh due to their bulk and by obscuring their serrations.

== Palaeoecology ==
=== Palaeoenvironment ===
Lycosuchus is notable amongst the fossil therapsids of the Karoo basin as it is known from two distinct assemblage zones (AZs), living at the end of the Tapinocephalus AZ and crossing into the Endothiodon AZ. This span of time is marked by the Capitanian mass extinction event, and represents a period of transition from one faunal assemblage to another. The interval of time across the Capitanian mass extinction has been argued to be marked by increasing environmental aridity from the Tapinocephalus AZ into the Endothiodon AZ in the Karoo, although average temperatures seem to have remained much the same. The depositional environment of the Karoo Basin at this time was a gently sloping alluvial plain made up of high-energy braided rivers and their surrounding floodplains that drained north to south from the Gondwanide mountains (represented in South Africa today by the Cape Fold Mountains) into the Ecca sea to the northeast, a receding inland sea. Although the early Endothiodon AZ was relatively drier, the floodplains were still well-vegetated. This period also saw an increase in river flow due to tectonic uplift of the Gondwanides, carrying and depositing much more sand through the channels and on the plains. This uplift was also associated with more volcanic activity that occasionally covered the alluvial plains in ash fall.

=== Tapinocephalus Assemblage Zone ===
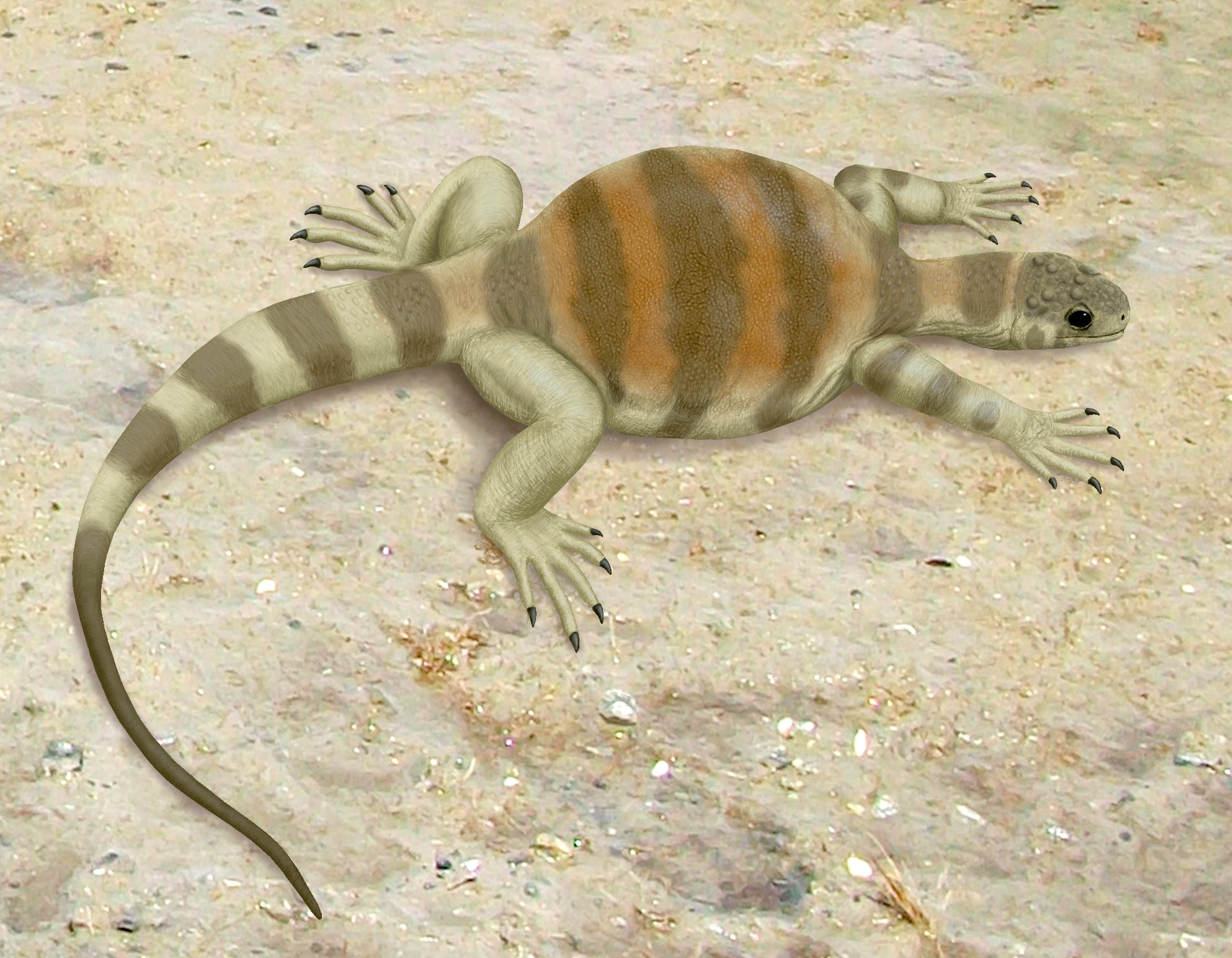
Artist's interpretation of the reptile Eunotosaurus, a contemporary of Lycosuchus throughout both assemblage zones

Lycosuchus first appears in the fossil record towards the end of the Tapinocephalus AZ (specifically the end of the Diictodon-Styracocephalus Subzone) and so briefly overlapped in time with its wide diversity of fauna. Lycosuchus coexisted with a variety of other predatory therocephalians, including fellow lycosuchid Simorhinella and several scylacosaurids, namely Alopecodon, Alopecognathus, Glanosuchus, Maraisaurus, Pristerognathus, and Scylacosaurus. Despite their diversity and abdundance, early therocephalians were still subordinate to the giant dinocephalian Anteosaurus, the top predator in the assemblage. Small therapsid carnivores are represented by the diminutive gorgonopsian Eriphostoma and the basal biarmosuchian Hipposaurus, alongside the varanopid "pelycosaur" Heleosaurus.

Nine genera of large herbivorous tapinocephalian dinocephalians are known to overlap at least the lowest range of Lycosuchus; namely the tapinocephalids Agnosaurus, Criocephalosaurus, Mormosaurus, Moschognathus, Moschops, and Tapinocephalus, the two titanosuchids Jonkeria and Titanosuchus, as well as Styracocephalus. Other large herbivores are the bradysaurians, basal pareiasaurs, namely Bradysaurus, Embrithosaurus, and Nochelesaurus. The roles of medium-sized to small herbivores were occupied mostly by anomodonts, including the diminutive "dromasaurs" Galechirus, Galepus and Galeops, as well as a variety of dicynodonts such as Brachyprosopus, Emydops, Pristerodon and the smaller pylaecephalids Diictodon, Eosimops, Prosictodon and Robertia. There were also some small reptiles, such as the millerettid Broomia, procolophonomorph Australothyris, and the enigmatic Eunotosaurus.

Most of these genera were wiped out during the Capitanian mass extinction event, the main pulse of which occurred roughly 260 million years ago. This saw the disappearance of all dinocephalians and pareiasaurs in the Karoo, as well as many of the other mid to large early therocephalians. Following the extinction pulse, the Tapinocephalus AZ fauna was reduced to only a few surviving genera, including Lycosuchus along with the scylacosaurids Alopecognathus and Pristerognathus, the small dicynodonts Diictodon, Emydops and Pristerodon, and Eunotosaurus. This reduced, low-diversity survivor fauna represents the end of the Tapinocephalus AZ.

With the extinction of Anteosaurus, Lycosuchus and other early therocephalians now occupied the role of top predators. It is unclear why some large early therocephalians survived while others perished in the extinction, even between close relatives like Lycosuchus and Simorhinella, suggesting that body size alone was not a main factor. Despite the drop in diversity, therocephalian fossils remain relatively abundant in this low-diversity zone, suggesting that one or more of the surviving genera, perhaps Lycosuchus, actually increased in abundance following the extinction.

=== Endothiodon Assemblage Zone ===
The beginning of the subsequent assemblage zone fauna and the onset of ecosystem recovery is marked by the appearance of the mid-sized dicynodont Endothiodon. Other new additions to the surviving fauna are the gorgonopsians Gorgonops and later Aelurosaurus, potentially the rare scylacosaurid Hyorhynchus (the only novel early therocephalian taxon in this assemblage zone, if it is also not a survivor of the Tapinocephalus AZ), the hofmeyriid therocephalians Hofmeyria and Ictidostoma, the baurioids Ictidosuchoides and Ictidosuchops, as well as the dicynodont Dicynodontoides and possibly the biarmosuchian Lobalopex. This fauna comprise the Lycosuchus-Eunotosaurus Subzone, which shows a mix of survivors of the older Guadalupian Tapinocephalus AZ like Lycosuchus with the onset of typical Lopingian dicynodont-dominated fauna.

Despite surviving a mass extinction, the presence of Lycosuchus (and other survivors) in this subzone is regarded as an example of a "dead clade walking", where the final extinction of a lineage is delayed for some time after the initial pulse of an extinction event. The surviving species, including Lycosuchus, are rarer than they were in the preceding Tapinocephalus AZ (with the exception of the gorgonopsian Eriphostoma), and Lycosuchus may have competed with larger gorgonopsians like Gorgonops as predators in the new ecosystem. The extinction of Lycosuchus and its disappearance from the fossil record marks the end of the Lycosuchus-Eunotosaurus SZ, and marks a secondary extinction pulse that wiped out most of the remaining genera from the Guadalupian along with it.

== See also ==
- Simorhinella
- Hyaenasuchus
- Zinnosaurus
