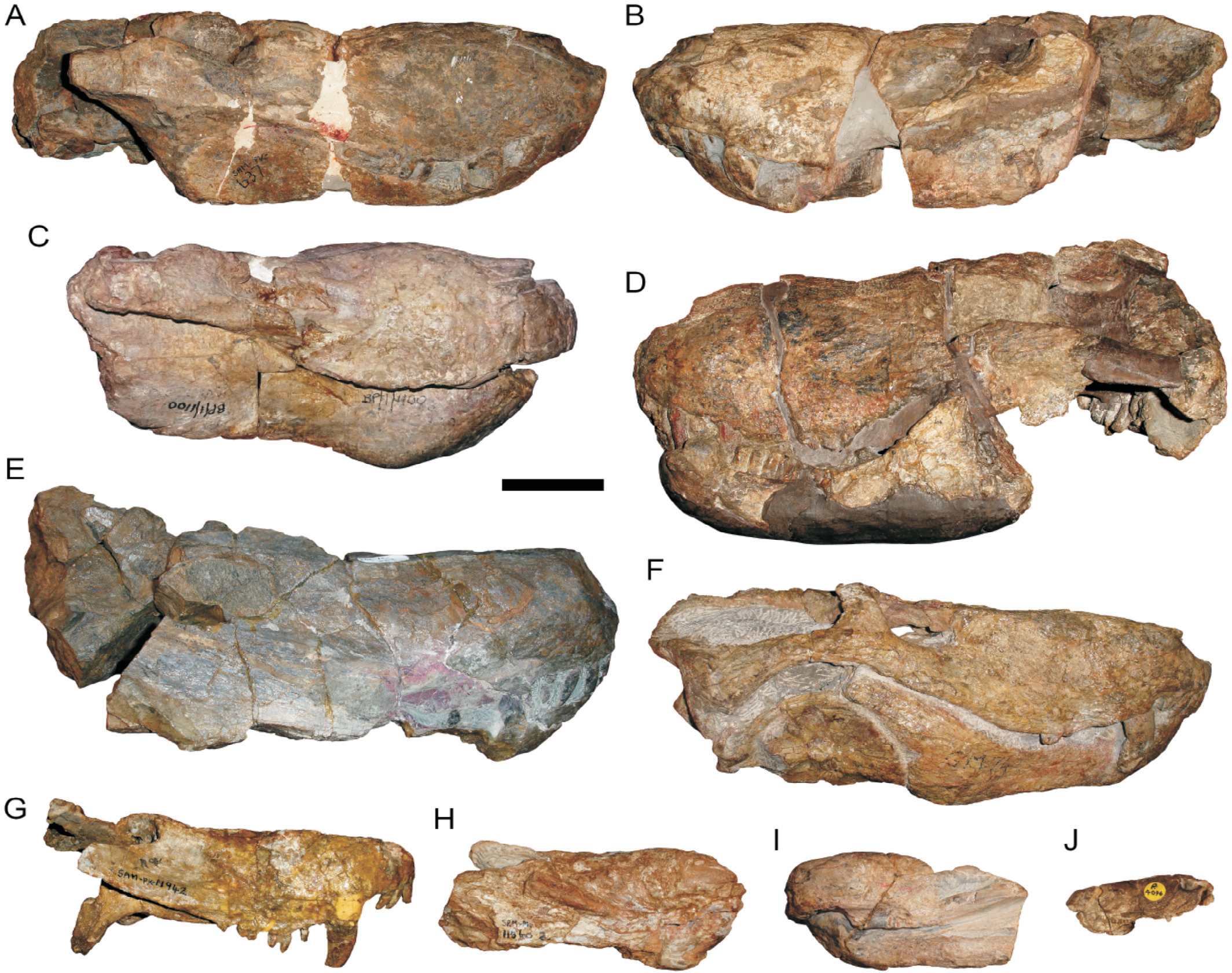
- Skulls in side view, including that of the holotype (A-B)

Scientific classification
- Kingdom: Animalia
- Phylum: Chordata
- Clade: Synapsida
- Clade: Therapsida
- Clade: †Therocephalia
- Family: †Scylacosauridae
- Genus: †Glanosuchus; Broom, 1904
- Species: †G. macrops

Binomial name
- †Glanosuchus macrops Broom, 1904

Synonyms
- Genus synonymy: Cynariognathus Broom, 1931; Walteria Brink & Kitching, 1951; Ptomalestes Boonstra, 1954; Karroowalteria Kuhn, 1958; Crapartinella Mendrez, 1975; Species synonymy: Pristerognathus platyrhinus Broom, 1912; Cynariognathus platyrhinus Broom, 1931; Walteria skinneri Brink & Kitching, 1951; Cynariognathus paucioridens Boonstra, 1954; Ptomalestes avidus Boonstra, 1954; Alopecognathus skinneri Boonstra, 1969; Crapartinella croucheri Mendrez, 1975

= Glanosuchus =

Glanosuchus Temporal range: Middle Permian (Capitanian), ~262–260 Ma

Extinct genus of therapsids

Glanosuchus is a genus of scylacosaurid therocephalian from the Middle Permian of South Africa. The type species G. macrops was named by Robert Broom in 1904. Glanosuchus had a middle ear structure that was intermediate between that of early therapsids and mammals. Ridges in the nasal cavity of Glanosuchus suggest it had an at least partially endothermic metabolism similar to modern mammals, although isotopic analysis suggested Glanosuchus was ectothermic.

Originally it was hypothesized that Glanosuchus survived the Capitanian mass extinction and persisted into the Endothiodon Assemblage Zone. However more recent analysis suggests it was restricted to the Tapinocephalus Assemblage Zone, suggesting Glanosuchus went extinct during the primary phase of the extinction event.

== Description ==
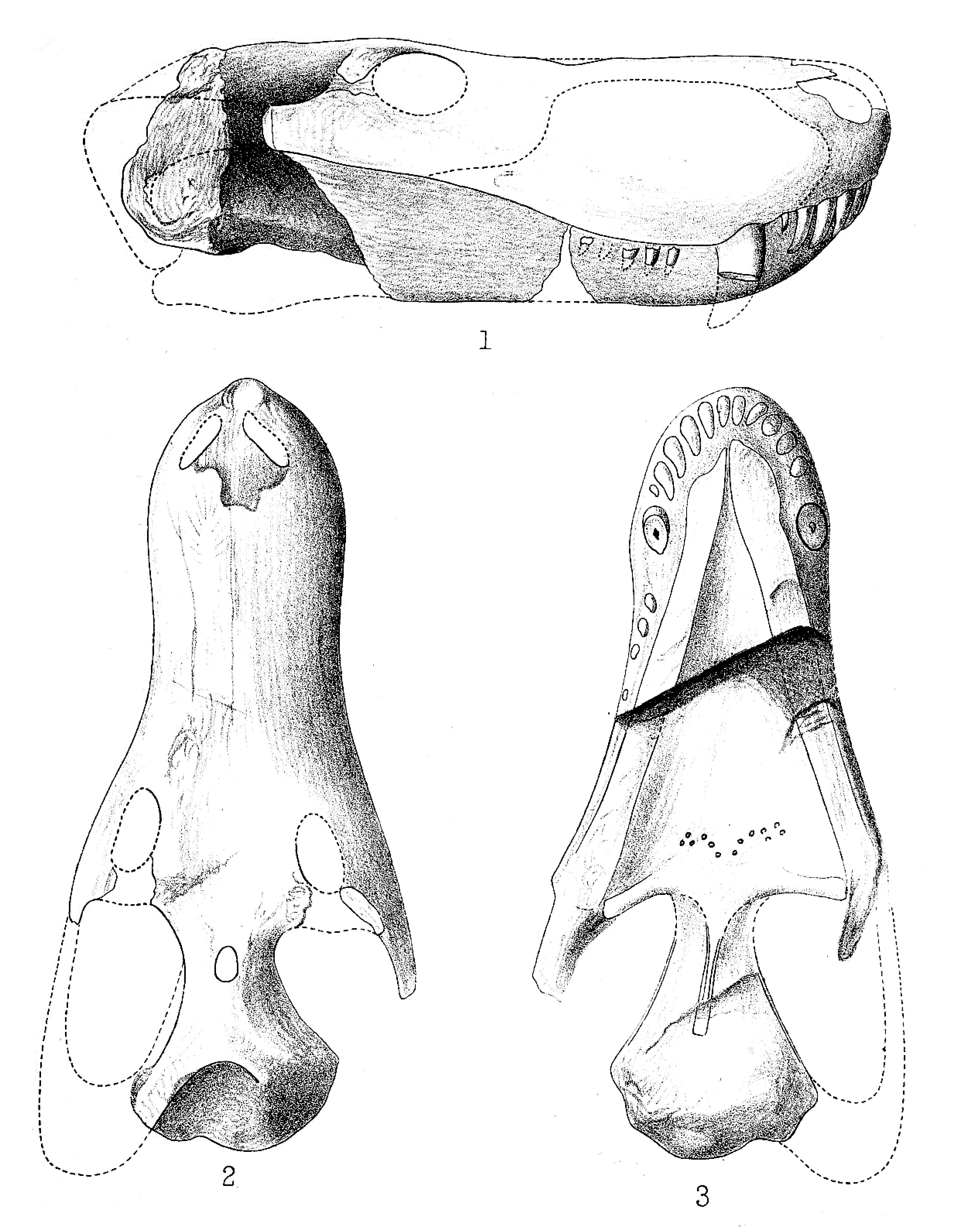
Illustration of the skull from 1904

Glanosuchus macrops was first described in 1904 by South African paleontologist Robert Broom, who named the genus and species on the basis of a nearly complete holotype skull. The skull has been distorted during fossilization and the bone is indistinguishable from the surrounding matrix in some parts. In illustrating the holotype, Broom chose to reconstruct the skull of the species rather than draw the actual specimen.

The skull of Glanosuchus is about 30 centimetres (12 in) long, although some skulls approached 37 centimetres (15 in). Glanosuchus probably grew to around 6 feet (1.8 m) in length. Like other early therocephalians, Glanosuchus had a long, deep snout and large canine teeth. The incisor teeth at the front of the upper jaw are also large and blade-like. There are six incisors on either side of the upper jaw, the furthest one being noticeably smaller than the rest. Five small pointed teeth are located behind each canine. The snout is wider in the front than it is behind, a usual feature among therapsids but present in several other related therocephalians. The nostrils are positioned at the tip of the snout and directed forward.

== Paleobiology ==
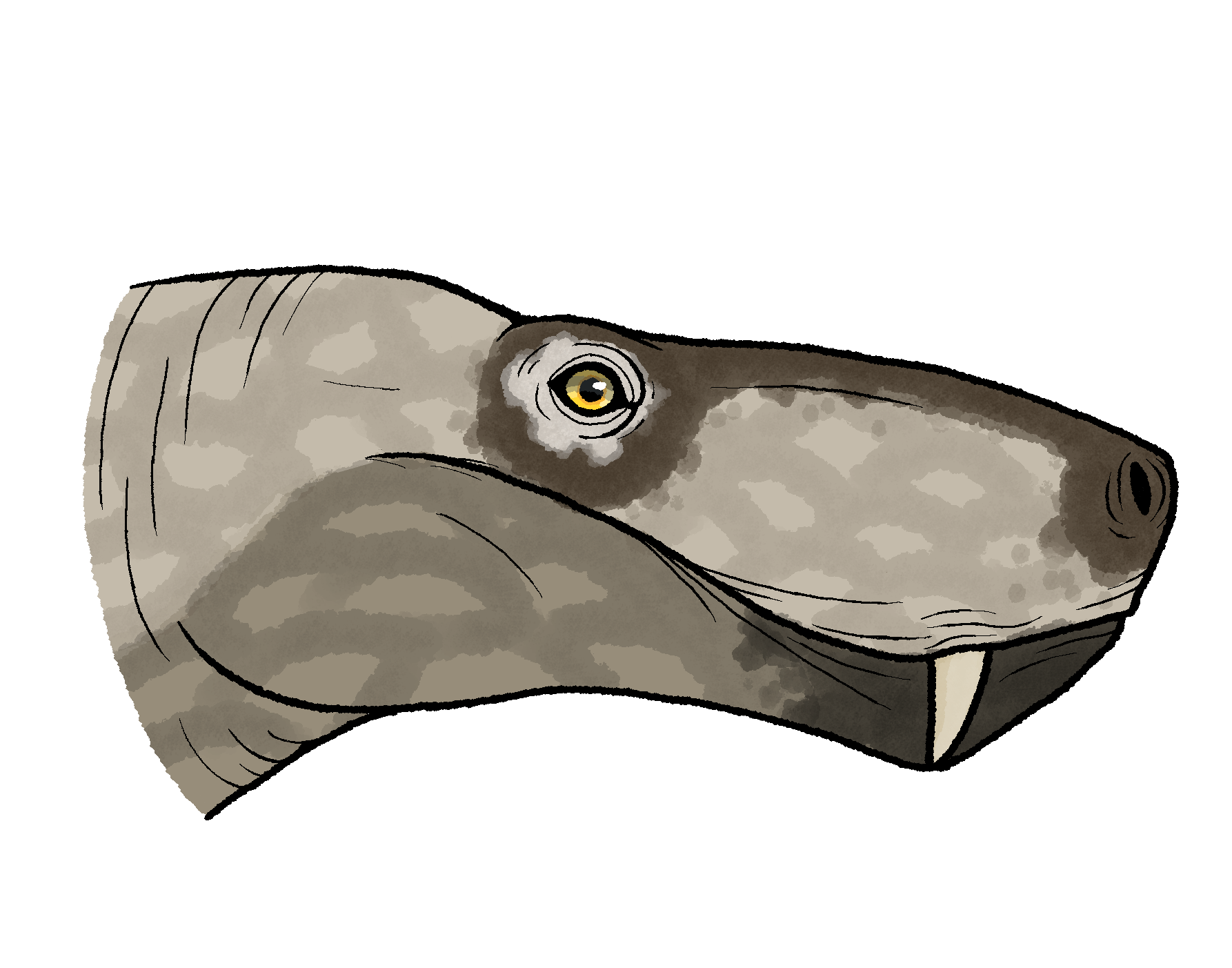
Life restoration

=== Hearing ===
Glanosuchus represents an early stage in the development of the mammalian middle ear. Modern mammals have three bones in the middle ear (the malleus, incus, and stapes) that transfer sound energy from the eardrum to the fluid of the inner ear. The malleus and incus of mammals developed from the articular and quadrate of early therapsids. Studies of the bones of Glanosuchus show that it had a very thin plate of bone that acted as an eardrum, receiving sounds and transferring them to a small air-filled cavity. The stapes and vestibular foramen (the hole that connects the middle and inner ears) are preserved in one specimen of Glanosuchus that was examined by grinding away cross sections of the skull. The anular ligament, a ring-like structure that forms a seal between the end of the stapes and the rim of the vestibular foramen, was probably held in place by cartilage. The transfer of sound between the thin bony plate and the vestibular foramen in Glanosuchus was not as effective as it is in mammals, meaning that the animal had a less acute sense of hearing.

=== Metabolism ===
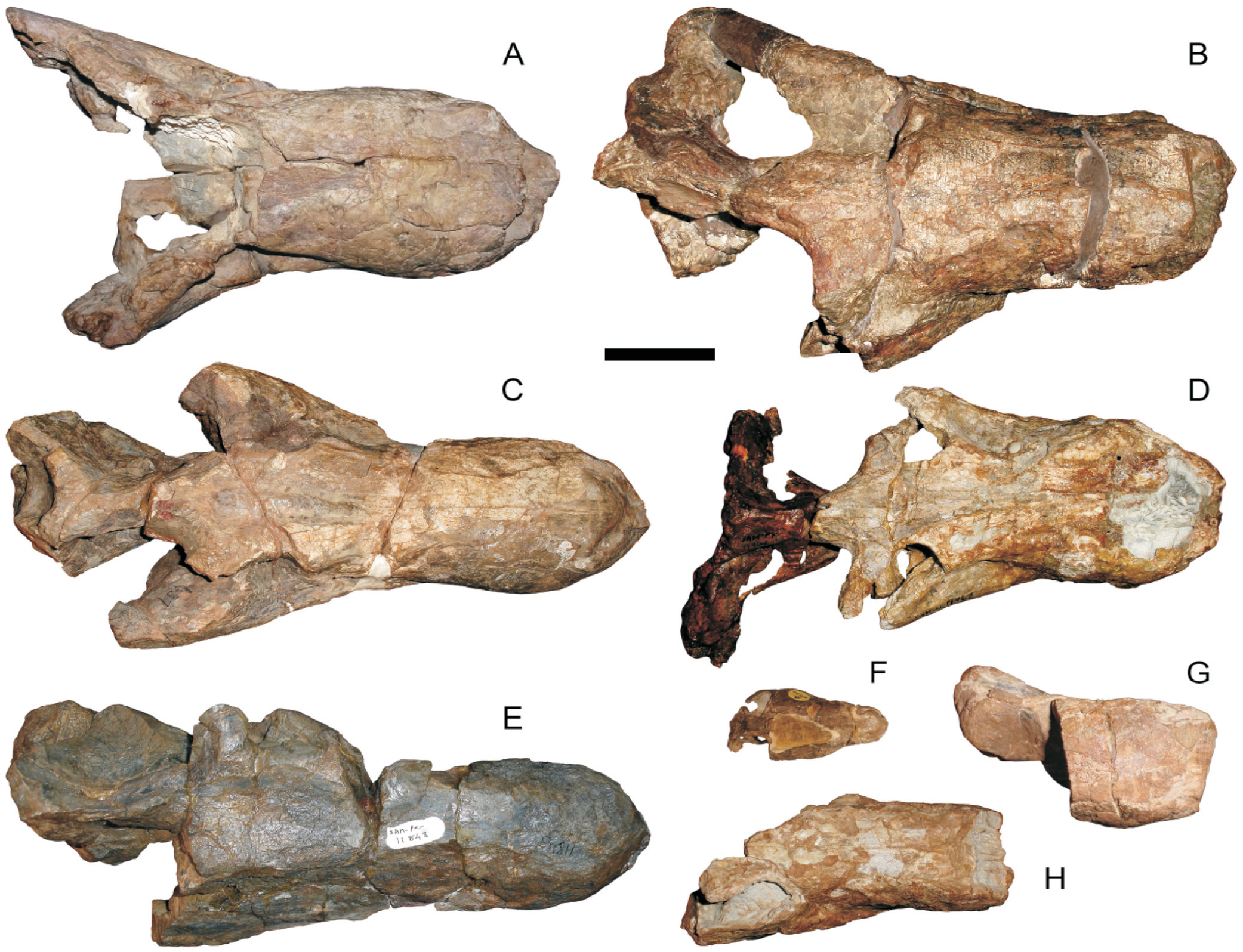
Skulls shown from above, including that of the holotype (C)

Glanosuchus may have been one of the first therapsids to achieve endothermy, or warm-bloodedness. Endothermy is seen today in mammals, the only living group of therapsids. Reptiles, the closest living relatives of mammals, are cold-blooded ectotherms with lower metabolic rates. Endothermic animals likely evolved from more primitive ectothermic synapsids sometime in the Permian or Triassic.

While fur, commonly accepted as a clear indication of endothermy, has not been found in non-mammalian therapsids, some skeletal features preserved in therapsid remains may be an indication of the metabolic rates of these animals. Modern mammals possess maxilloturbinates, which are a type of concha (shelf of bone) in the nasal cavity that collect moisture from inhaled air. As endotherms, mammals must breathe rapidly to supply enough oxygen for their high metabolisms. As oxygen passes into and out of the nasal cavity, it dries out the surrounding tissue. Water from inhaled air condenses on the maxilloturbinates, preventing the drying out of the nasal cavity and allowing mammals to inhale enough oxygen to support their high metabolisms.

Reptiles and more primitive synapsids have conchae, but these plates of bone are involved in sensing smell rather than preventing desiccation. While the maxilloturbinates of mammals are located in the path of airflow to collect moisture, sensory cochae in both mammals and reptiles are positioned farther back and above the nasal passage, away from the flow of air. Glanosuchus has ridges positioned low in the nasal cavity, indicating that it had maxilloturbinates that were in the direct path of airflow. The maxilloturbinates may not have been preserved because they were either very thin or cartilaginous. The possibility has also been raised that these ridges are associated with an olfactory epithelium rather than turbinates. Nonetheless, the possible presence of maxilloturbinates suggests that Glanosuchus may have been able to rapidly breathe without drying out the nasal passage, and therefore could have been an endotherm.

Glanosuchus is the earliest known therapsid to possess maxilloturbinates, but it shares features with reptiles that suggest it was not fully endothermic. Choanae, two holes in the palate that connect the nasal cavity to the mouth, are positioned far forward in reptiles, early synapsids, and Glanosuchus. This shortens the nasal cavity, thereby reducing the ability to humidify incoming air. The choanae migrated farther back in the palate later in therocephalian evolution, suggesting that advanced forms like Bauria had high metabolic rates similar to those of mammals. As the choanae moved farther back, a secondary palate expanded in front of it. This expansion occurred in both therocephalians and the related cynodonts, indicating that the two groups were convergently acquiring mammalian characteristics in the Permian and Triassic. Although therocephalians died out by the Middle Triassic, cynodonts continued to diversify, giving rise to fully endothermic mammals in the Late Triassic. Rey and colleagues performed isotopic analysis in a 2017 paper and recovered Glanosuchus, as well as contemporary tetrapods, as ectothermic animals.

== Paleoecology ==
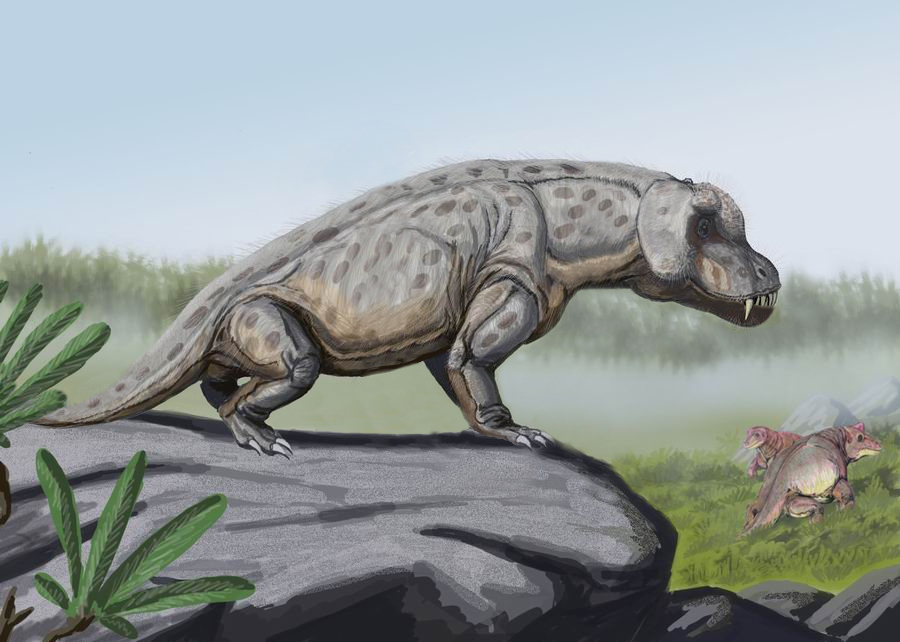
Reconstruction of Anteosaurus in a terrestrial environment. Anteosaurus was the largest predator present in the Tapinocephalus Assemblage Zone

The depositional environment of the Karoo Basin at this time was a gently sloping alluvial plain made up of high-energy braided rivers and their surrounding floodplains that drained north to south from the Gondwanide mountains (represented in South Africa today by the Cape Fold Mountains) into the Ecca sea to the northeast, a receding inland sea. Although the early Endothiodon AZ was relatively drier, the floodplains were still well-vegetated. This period also saw an increase in river flow due to tectonic uplift of the Gondwanides, carrying and depositing much more sand through the channels and on the plains. This uplift was also associated with more volcanic activity that occasionally covered the alluvial plains in ash fall.

Basal therocephalians were the most abundant predators in the assemblage zone, mostly represented by scylacosaurids. Fellow sylacosaurids included Alopecodon, Alopecognathus, Maraisaurus, Pristerognathus, and Scylacosaurus. Lycosuchids on the other hand were less diverse compared to the sylacosaurids, being represented by Lycosuchus and Simorhinella. Despite their high abundance and diversity, basal therocephalians were subordinate to Anteosaurus, a large basal dinocephalian. The small predator guild included the small monitor-like varanopids Elliotsmithia, Heleosaurus, and Microvaranops, the millerettid Broomia, the procolophonomorph Australothyris, and the lizard-like sauropsid Eunotosaurus.

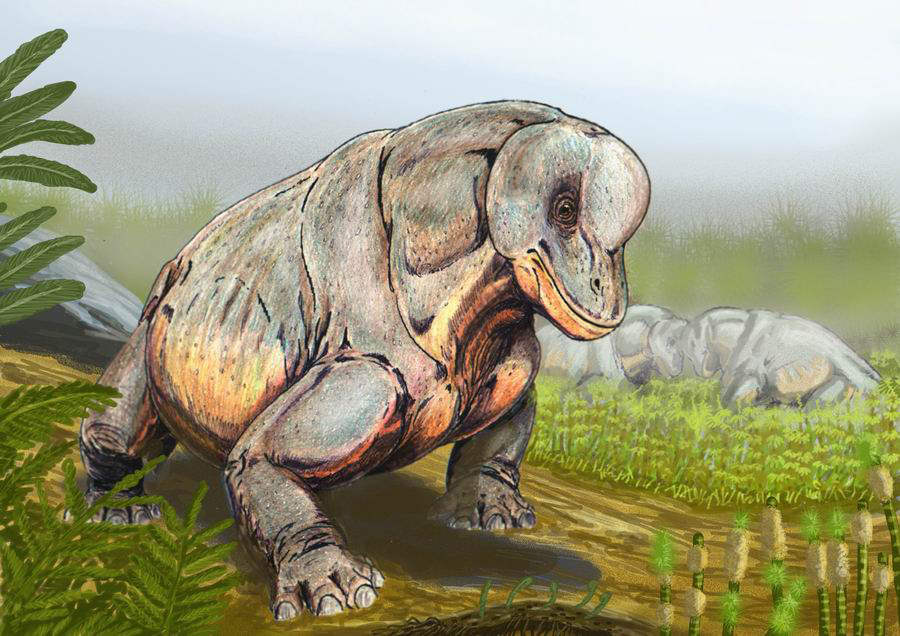
Reconstruction of Tapinocephalus, one of the large herbivores that were contemporary with Glanosuchus

Herbivores were numerous and diverse. Large herbivorous therapsids were presented by tapinocephalids such as Criocephalosaurus, Mormosaurus, Moschognathus, Moschops, Riebeeckosaurus,Struthiocephalus, and Tapinocephalus, titanosuchids Jonkeria and Titanosuchus, and the styracocephalid Styracocephalus. Large sauropsids were represented by bradysaurian pareiasaurs such as Bradysaurus, Embrithosaurus and Nochelesaurus, whose dentition very different from that of herbivorous dinocephalians indicates that the two groups occupied clearly distinct ecological niches.

Small herbivores of the assemblage consisted of non-dicynodonts anomodonts such as Anomocephalus, Galechirus, Galeops, and Galepus and numerous dicynodonts such as Brachyprosopus, Colobodectes, Pristerodon, and the Pylaecephalids Diictodon, Eosimops,Prosictodon, and Robertia.

Fossils assigned to Glanosuchus have been noted in the Eodicynodon Assemblage Zone of the Wordian stage of the Middle Permian, although more recent analysis reclassified the fossils as Eutheriodon.

== Extinction ==
Day & Rubidge (2021) noted the presence of Glanosuchus in the Endothiodon Assemblage Zone of the early Late Permian, suggesting it survived the primary phase of the Capitanian mass extinction before going extinct during the second wave of extinctions. However, Kammerer (2023) reclassified Endothiodon AZ Glanosuchus specimens as Alopecognathus. Combined with Eodicynodon Assemblage Zone Glanosuchus fossils being reclassified as Eutheriodon, this would restrict Glanosuchus to the Tapinocephalus Assemblage Zone, possibly to the Diictodon-Styracocephalus SZ, suggesting Glanosuchus didn't survive the extinction event as previously hypothesized.

The Capitanian mass extinction coincided with the beginning of a major negative δ^{13}C excursion signifying a severe disturbance of the carbon cycle, was triggered by eruptions of the Emeishan Traps large igneous province, basalt piles from which currently cover an area of 250,000 to 500,000 km^{2}, although the original volume of the basalts may have been anywhere from 500,000 km^{3} to over 1,000,000 km^{3}. Reefs and other marine sediments interbedded among basalt piles indicate Emeishan volcanism initially developed underwater, with terrestrial outflows of lava occurred only later in the large igneous province's period of activity. These eruptions would have released high doses of toxic mercury; increased mercury concentrations are coincident with the negative carbon isotope excursion, indicating a common volcanic cause. Coronene enrichment at the Guadalupian-Lopingian boundary further confirms the existence of massive volcanic activity; coronene can only form at extremely high temperatures created either by extraterrestrial impacts or massive volcanism, with the former being ruled out because of an absence of iridium anomalies coeval with mercury and coronene anomalies.

The Emeishan Traps erupted in two pulses, with each lasting about 300,000 years. During the first pulse, warming was estimated at 2.3 °C, while the warming in the second pulse was estimated at 1.3 °C. The eruptions also resulted in acification, short-term cooling, and volcanically induced darkness, which would've reduced photosynthesis in terrestrial ecosystems. While the positive change in δ^{13}C has been documented in uppermost Tapinocephalus AZ, the lack of change in the abundance of oxygen isotopes suggests no significant temperature changes during the extinction interval despite the increase in aridity.

Other than Glanosuchus, primary waves of the extinction saw the extinction of most basal therocephalians, as well the complete extinction of dinocephalians, bradysaurian pareiasaurs, varanopids, and Gondwanan basal anomodonts.
