= 1914 in paleontology =

Paleontology or palaeontology is the study of prehistoric life forms on Earth through the examination of plant and animal fossils. This includes the study of body fossils, tracks (ichnites), burrows, cast-off parts, fossilised feces (coprolites), palynomorphs and chemical residues. Because humans have encountered fossils for millennia, paleontology has a long history both before and after becoming formalized as a science. This article records significant discoveries and events related to paleontology that occurred or were published in the year 1914.

== Arthropods ==
=== Newly named insects ===
Name	Novelty	Status	Authors	Age	Unit	Location	Notes	Images
Raphidia pulveris	Sp nov	jr synonym	Cockerell	Eocene; Priabonian	Florissant Formation	USA; Colorado	A raphidiid snakefly Synonymized with Megaraphidia exhumata in 2014	Megaraphidia exhumata

== Dinosaurs ==
- Eugene Stebinger became the first to identify the Two Medicine Formation and to formally describe its first fossil finds, which were excavated the previous year.

=== New taxa ===
Taxon	Novelty	Status	Author(s)	Age	Unit	Location	Notes	Images
Anchiceratops ornatus	Gen. et sp. nov.	Valid	Brown	Maastrichtian	Horseshoe Canyon Formation	Alberta	A ceratopsid	
Brachyceratops montanensis	Gen. et sp. nov.	Nomen dubium	Gilmore	Campanian	Two Medicine Formation	Montana	A ceratopsid	
Chasmosaurus	Gen. nov.	Valid	Lambe	Campanian	Dinosaur Park Formation	Alberta	A replacement name for Protorosaurus, a new genus for Monoclonius belli	
Corythosaurus casuarius	Gen. et sp. nov.	Valid	Brown	Campanian	Dinosaur Park Formation	Alberta	A hadrosaurid	
Dicraeosaurus hansemanni	Gen. et sp. nov.	Valid	Janensch	Kimmeridgian	Tendaguru Formation	Tanzania	A Jurassic sauropod	
Dicraeosaurus sattleri	Sp. nov.	Valid	Janensch	Kimmeridgian	Tendaguru Formation	Tanzania	A second species of Dicraeosaurus	
Gorgosaurus libratus	Gen. et sp. nov.	Valid	Lambe	Campanian	Dinosaur Park Formation	Alberta	A tyrannosaurid	
Gryposaurus notabilis	Gen. et sp. nov.	Valid	Lambe	Campanian	Dinosaur Park Formation	Alberta	A hadrosaurid	
Leptoceratops gracilis	Gen. et sp. nov	Valid	Brown	Maastrichtian	Scollard Formation	Alberta	An early ceratopsian	
Protorosaurus	Gen. nov.	Preoccupied	Lambe	Campanian	Dinosaur Park Formation	Alberta	New genus for Monoclonius belli, but preoccupied by a non-dinosaurian archosauromorph von Meyer, 1830. Renamed Chasmosaurus.	
Stephanosaurus	Gen. nov.	Nomen dubium	Lambe	Campanian	Dinosaur Park Formation	Alberta	A new genus name for Trachodon marginatus	

== Plesiosaurs ==
=== New taxa ===
Name	Novelty	Status	Authors	Age	Unit	Location	Notes	Images
Brancasaurus	Gen et sp nov	Valid	Wegner	Berriasian	Isterberg Formation	Germany	A possibly freshwater dwelling plesiosaur	Brancasaurus

== Pterosaurs ==
=== New taxa ===
Name	Novelty	Status	Authors	Age	Unit	Location	Notes	Images
Lonchodectes	Fam et Gen nov	Valid	Hooley	Late Cretaceous		UK	An ornithocheiromorph	Lonchodectes compressirostris

== Synapsids ==
=== Non-mammalian ===
Name	Status	Authors	Age	Location	Notes	Images
Arctops	Valid	Watson	255 million years ago	South Africa	A Gorgonopsian.	Arctops
Mormosaurus	Valid	Watson	270 million years ago	South Africa	A Dinocephalian.	Mormosaurus
Moschognathus	Valid		263 million years ago	South Africa		
Pnigalion	Valid					
