= PSSA =

PSSA may stand for:

- Pennsylvania System of School Assessment
- Postsunset authorization (in AM broadcasting), an American radio permission to broadcast in AM after sunset
- Particularly Sensitive Sea Area, protected areas of seas, oceans or large lakes
- Philosophical Society of South Africa
- Physica Status Solidi A, a scientific journal
- Preliminary System Safety Assessment, a recommended technique in the aerospace ARP4761 practice for using common modeling techniques to assess the safety of a system being developed
- Public Statues and Sculpture Association, an organisation with an interest in British public sculptures

== Football clubs ==
- PSSA Asahan, an Indonesian football club
- PSSA Rapids, a defunct American soccer team
