= Koksharovia =

Koksharovia Temporal range: Permian

Scientific classification
- Kingdom: Animalia
- Phylum: Chordata
- Clade: Synapsida
- Clade: Therapsida
- Clade: †Therocephalia
- Family: †Scylacosauridae
- Genus: †Koksharovia; Suchkova et al., 2022
- Species: †K. grechovi

Binomial name
- †Koksharovia grechovi Suchkova et al., 2022

Extinct genus of therapsids

Koksharovia is an extinct genus of therocephalian synapsid that inhabited what is now the Kirov Oblast of Russia during the Permian period. It contains the species Koksharovia grechovi.
