= Julognathus =

Julognathus Temporal range: Middle Permian

Scientific classification
- Kingdom: Animalia
- Phylum: Chordata
- Clade: Synapsida
- Clade: Therapsida
- Clade: †Therocephalia
- Family: †Scylacosauridae
- Genus: †Julognathus; Suchkova & Golubev, 2019

Type species
- Julognathus crudelis Suchkova & Golubev, 2019

Extinct genus of therapsids

Julognathus is an extinct genus of therocephalian in the family Scylacosauridae. It is known from a single species, Julognathus crudelis, from the Middle Permian of Russia.
