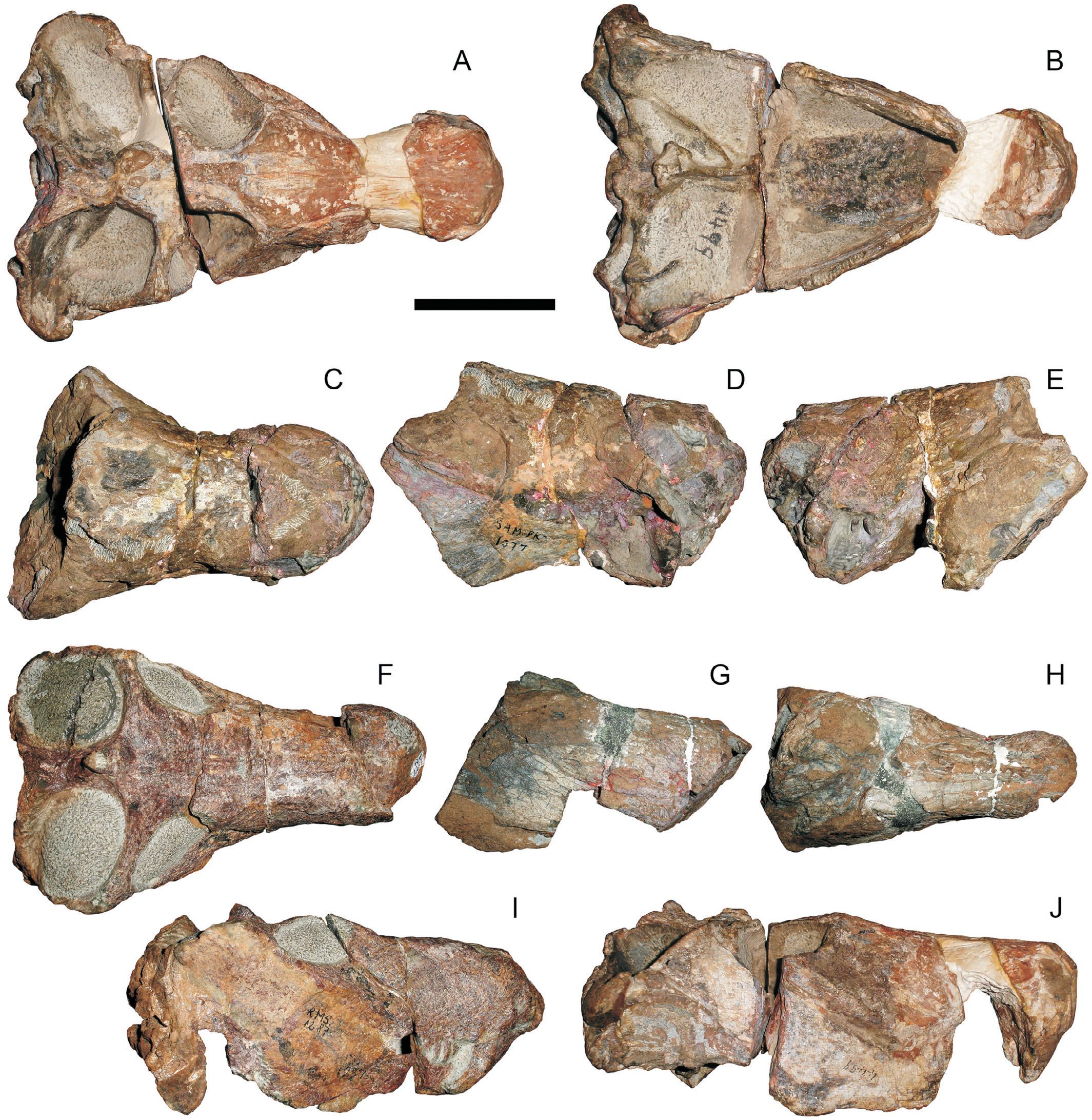
- Skulls including that of the holotype (C-E)

Scientific classification
- Domain: Eukaryota
- Kingdom: Animalia
- Phylum: Chordata
- Clade: Synapsida
- Clade: Therapsida
- Clade: †Therocephalia
- Family: †Scylacosauridae
- Genus: †Pardosuchus; Broom, 1908
- Species: †P. whaitsi

Binomial name
- †Pardosuchus whaitsi Broom, 1908

Synonyms
- Genus synonymy: Lycedops Broom, 1935; Species synonymy: Alopecodon rugosus Broom, 1908; Lycedops scholtzi Broom, 1935

= Pardosuchus =

Pardosuchus Temporal range: Middle Permian 265–259 Ma

Extinct genus of therapsids

Pardosuchus is an extinct genus of therocephalians known from the Permian of South Africa.
