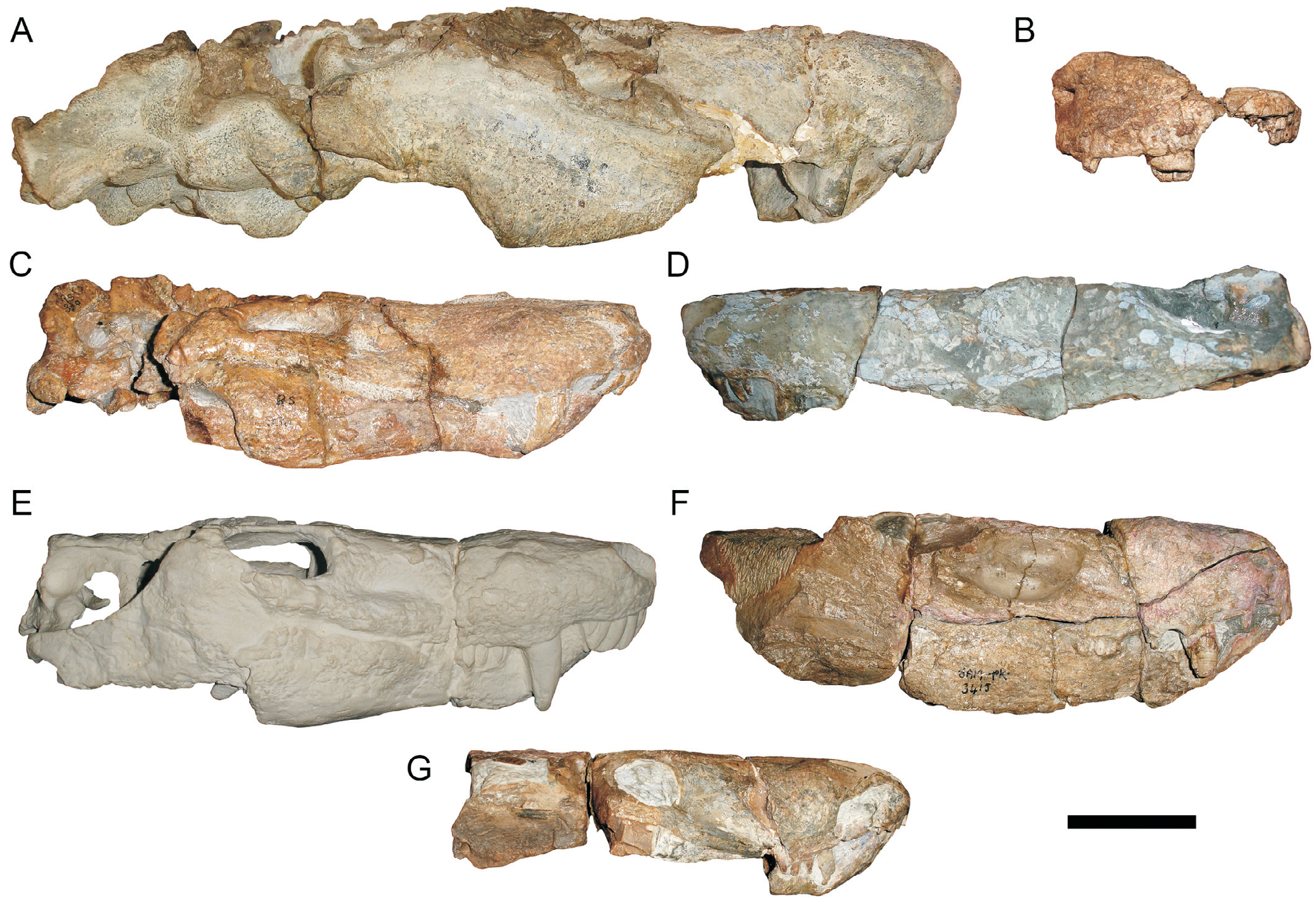
- Skulls in side view, including that of the holotype (B)

Scientific classification
- Kingdom: Animalia
- Phylum: Chordata
- Clade: Synapsida
- Clade: Therapsida
- Clade: †Therocephalia
- Family: †Scylacosauridae
- Genus: †Pristerognathus; Seeley, 1895
- Species: †P. polyodon

Binomial name
- †Pristerognathus polyodon Seeley, 1895

Synonyms
- Genus synonymy: Pristerognathoides Boonstra, 1954; Species synonymy: Alopecognathus minor Haughton, 1918; Pristerognathus peyeri Broili & Schröder, 1936; Pristerognathoides minor Boonstra, 1954; Pristerognathoides parvus Boonstra, 1954

= Pristerognathus =

Pristerognathus Temporal range: Middle-Late Permian (Capitanian to Wuchiapingian) 262–258 Ma

Extinct genus of therapsid from the Middle Permian of South Africa

Pristerognathus is an extinct genus of therocephalian, known from the late Middle Permian (Capitanian) of South Africa. It lends its name to the now defunct Pristerognathus Assemblage Zone of the Beaufort Group of South African geological strata (now mostly equivalent to the lower Endothiodon Assemblage Zone). Pristerognathus was a medium-sized therocephalian with a 25 cm (9.8 in) skull and a total length up to 1.5 m (4 ft 11 in).

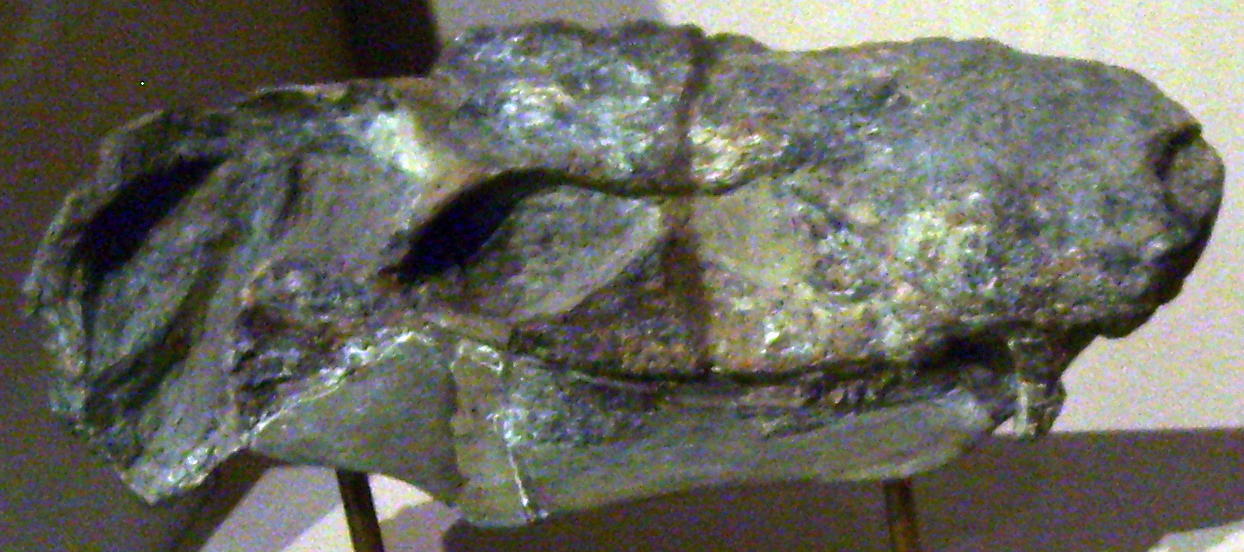
Skull in Museum für Naturkunde, Berlin

These animals were roughly dog-sized, and are characterized by long, narrow skulls with large canines. They are likely to have lived in woodlands, and preyed on smaller therapsids and millerettids of the time.

Pristerognathus was described in 1895 by Harry Seeley who named the type species Pristerognathus polyodon. Many other species were named in the years following, such as P. baini, P. minor, and P. vanderbyli, however, they have all since been recognised as referable to other species (such as Glanosuchus and Pristerognathoides) or are too dubious to determine. As such, P. polyodon is the only definitive species of Pristerognathus.

== See also ==
- List of therapsids
