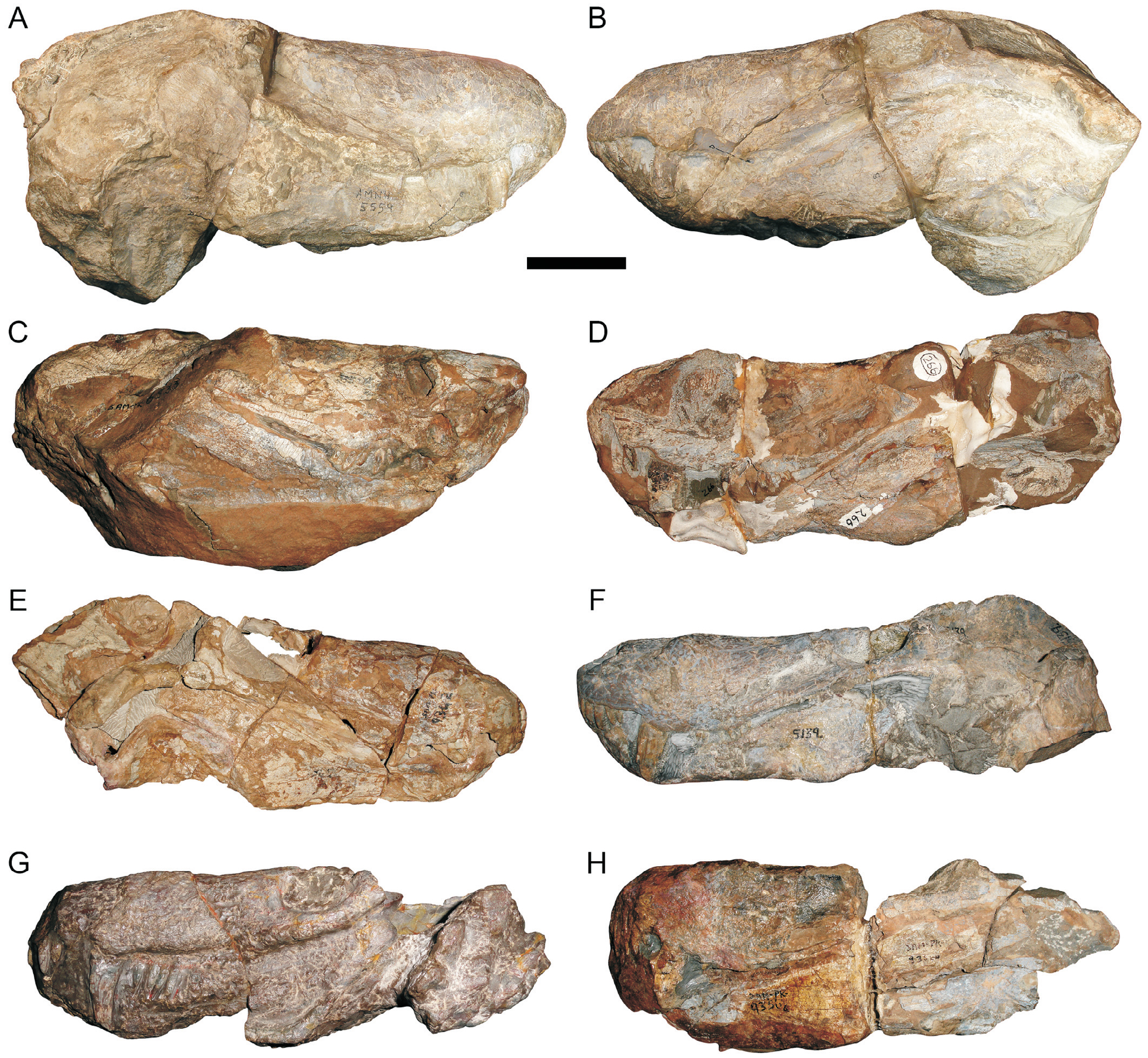
- Skulls including that of the holotype (A-B)

Scientific classification
- Kingdom: Animalia
- Phylum: Chordata
- Clade: Synapsida
- Clade: Therapsida
- Clade: †Therocephalia
- Family: †Scylacosauridae
- Genus: †Alopecognathus; Broom, 1915
- Species: †A. angusticeps

Binomial name
- †Alopecognathus angusticeps Broom, 1915

Synonyms
- Genus synonymy: Alopecideops Broom, 1932; Species synonymy: Pristerognathus vanderbyli Broom, 1925; Pristerognathus vanwyki Broom, 1925; Alopecideops gracilis Broom, 1932; Cynariognathus gallowayi Broom, 1936; Cynariognathus seeleyi Broili & Schröder, 1936; Alopecognathus megalops Broom, 1937; Alopecognathus angustioriceps Boonstra, 1953; Pristerognathus roggeveldensis Boonstra, 1953

= Alopecognathus =

Alopecognathus Temporal range: Middle-Late Permian (Capitanian to Wuchiapingian) 262–258 Ma

Extinct genus of therapsids

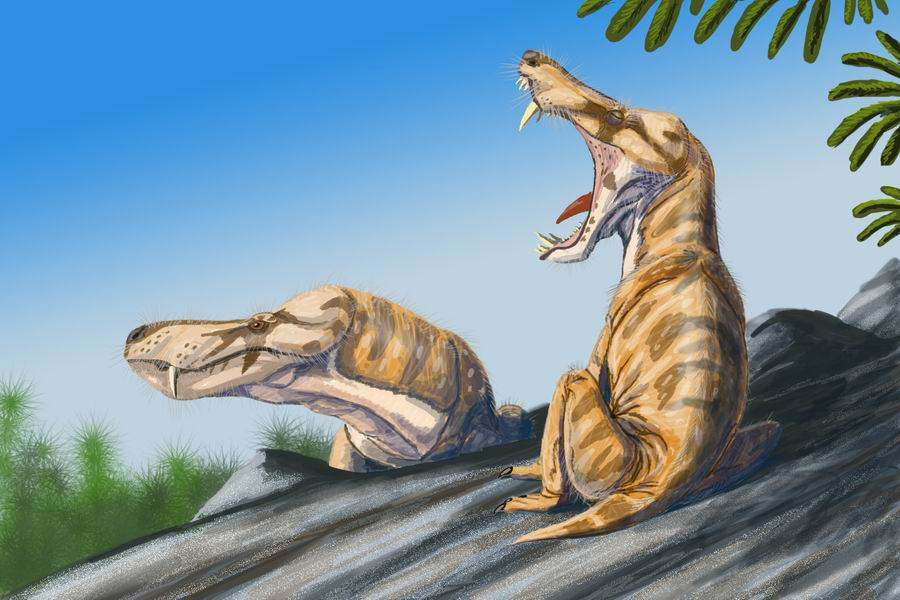
Life restoration

Alopecognathus is an extinct genus of therocephalian therapsids from the Middle to Late Permian of South Africa. Alopecognathus was a large therocephalian, with a skull length of 32.7 centimetres (12.9 in).
