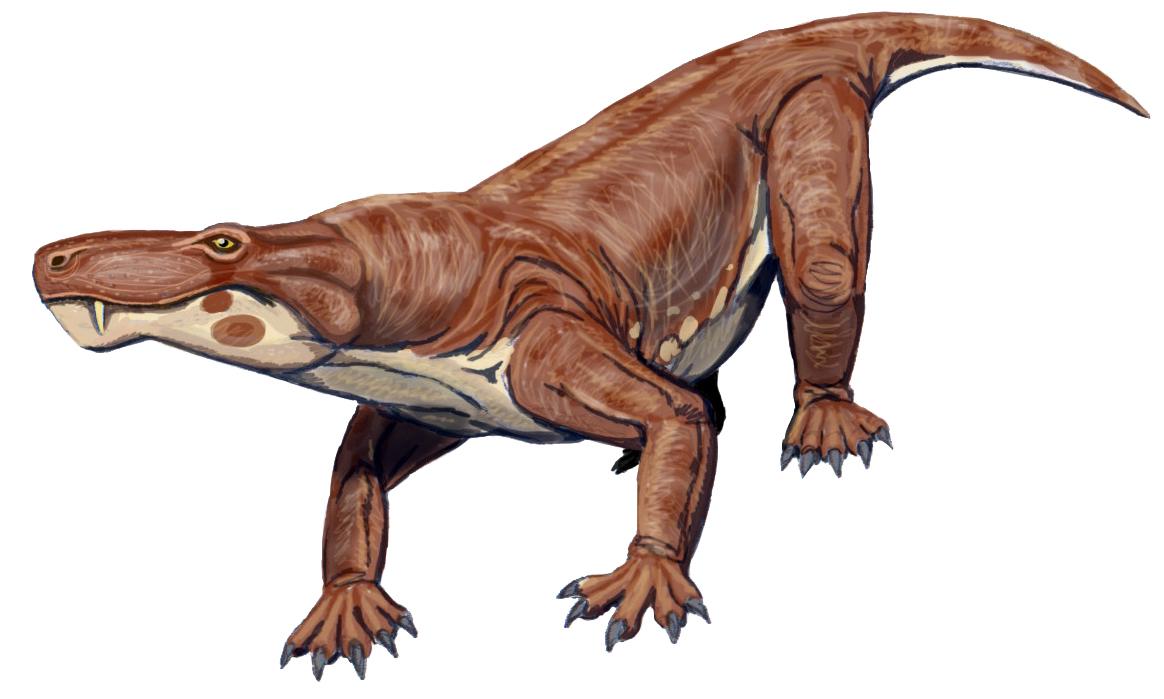
- Life restoration of Scylacosaurus

Scientific classification
- Kingdom: Animalia
- Phylum: Chordata
- Clade: Synapsida
- Clade: Therapsida
- Clade: †Therocephalia
- Clade: †Scylacosauria
- Family: †Scylacosauridae; Broom, 1903

Type genus
- Scylacosaurus Broom, 1903

Genera
- †Alopecodon; †Alopecognathus; †Biarmosuchoides?; †Eutheriodon; †Glanosuchus; †Hyorhynchus; †Julognathus; †Koksharovia; †Maraisaurus; †Pardosuchus; †Pristerognathus; †Scylacosaurus

Synonyms
- Pristerognathidae Haughton, 1924; Alopecodontidae Broom, 1932; Ictidosauridae Broom 1932; Crapartinellidae Mendrez, 1975

= Scylacosauridae =

Scylacosauridae Temporal range: Middle Permian–Late Permian, 265–258 Ma

Extinct family of therapsids

Scylacosauridae is an extinct family of therocephalian therapsids. Scylacosaurids lived during the Permian period and were among the most basal therocephalians. The family was named by South African paleontologist Robert Broom in 1903. Scylacosaurids have long snouts and unusual saber-like canine teeth. Most scylacosaurids went extinct during the primary wave of extinctions of the Capitanian mass extinction. Only Alopecognathus and Pristerognathus persisting into the Late Permian. The last scylacosaurids would later go extinct during the second wave of extinction. While most scylacosaurids were known from the Karoo Basin of South Africa, Julognathus was found within the Sundry Assemblage of Eastern Europe.
