= Philosophical Society of South Africa =

Philosophical Society of Southern Africa
- President: Gregory Morgan Swer
- Key people: Chantelle Grey - Secretary, Anné Verhoef - Treasurer, Lindani Gobingca, Nathisvaran Govender
- Formerly called: Philosophical Society of South Africa
- Website: https://philsafrica.org.za/

The Philosophical Society of Southern Africa (PSSA) is a community of academic philosophers drawn from Philosophy departments across Southern Africa. It aims to promote dialogue and interaction between philosophers in the region, encompassing postgraduate participation and development and the facilitation of philosophical research and teaching of the highest standard.

The PSSA’s flagship event is its annual conference, which is hosted on a rotational basis by its member departments.

== Controversy ==
The society became controversial in 2017 due to allegations of racism.
