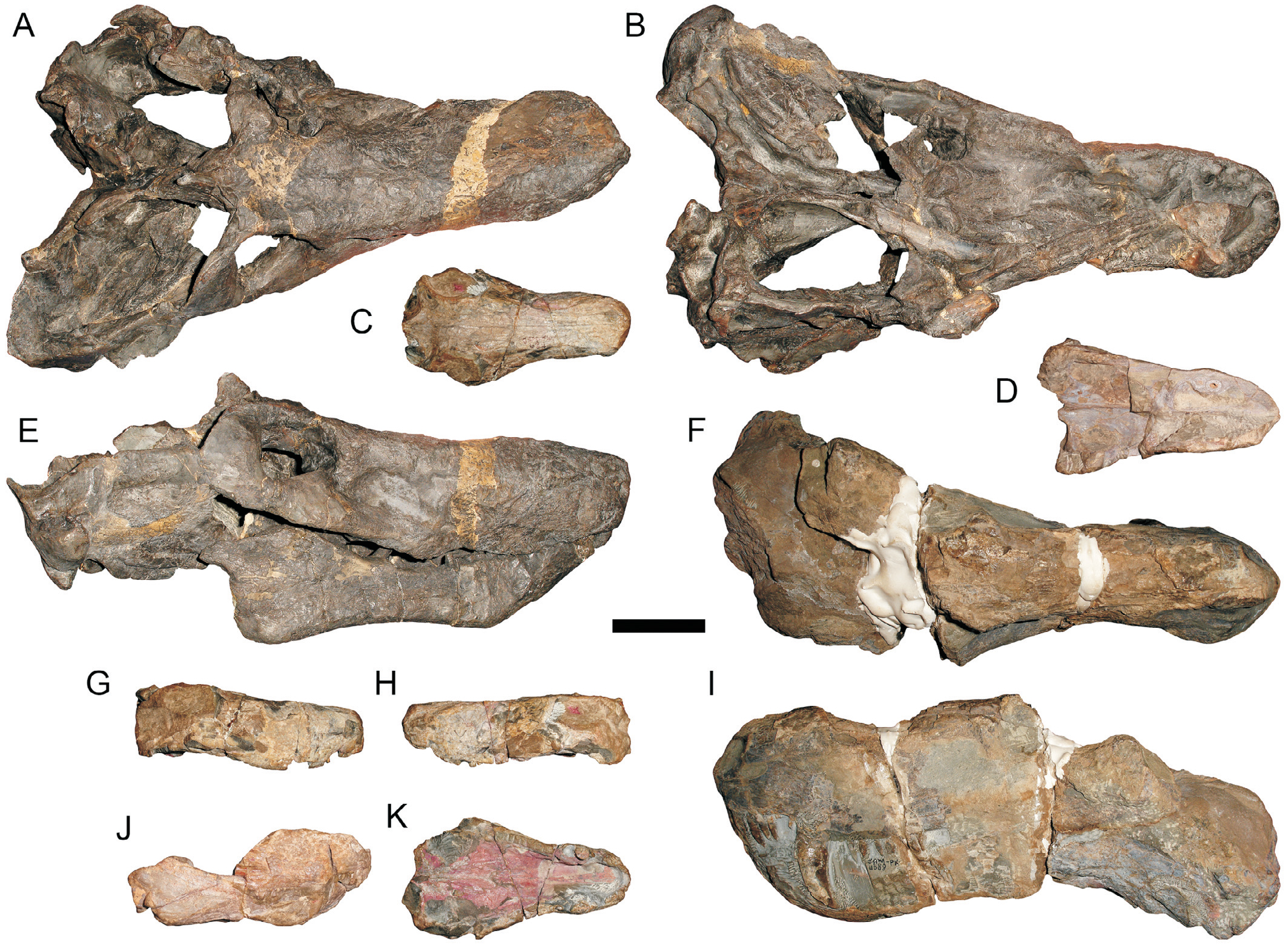
- Skulls including that of the holotype (C-K)

Scientific classification
- Kingdom: Animalia
- Phylum: Chordata
- Clade: Synapsida
- Clade: Therapsida
- Clade: †Therocephalia
- Family: †Scylacosauridae
- Genus: †Scylacosaurus; Broom, 1903

Type species
- † Scylacosaurus sclateri Broom, 1903

= Scylacosaurus =

Scylacosaurus Temporal range: Permian

Extinct genus of therapsids from the Permian

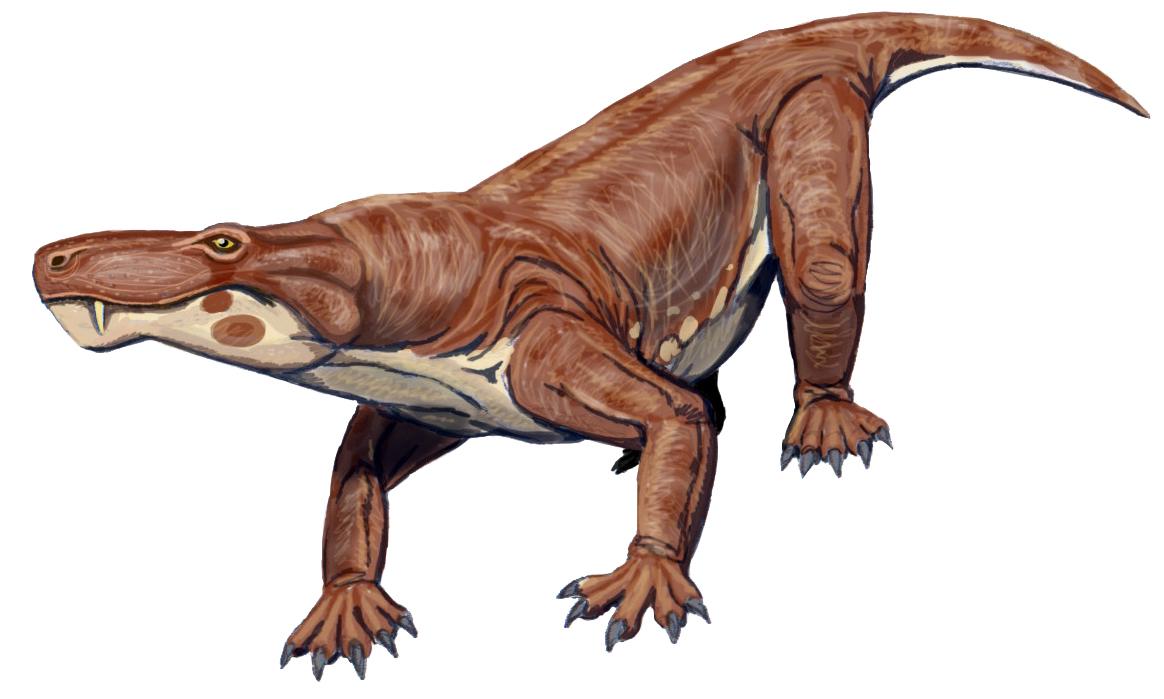
Life restoration

Scylacosaurus is an extinct genus of therocephalian therapsids that lived during the Permian period. It contains one species Scylacosaurus sclateri.
