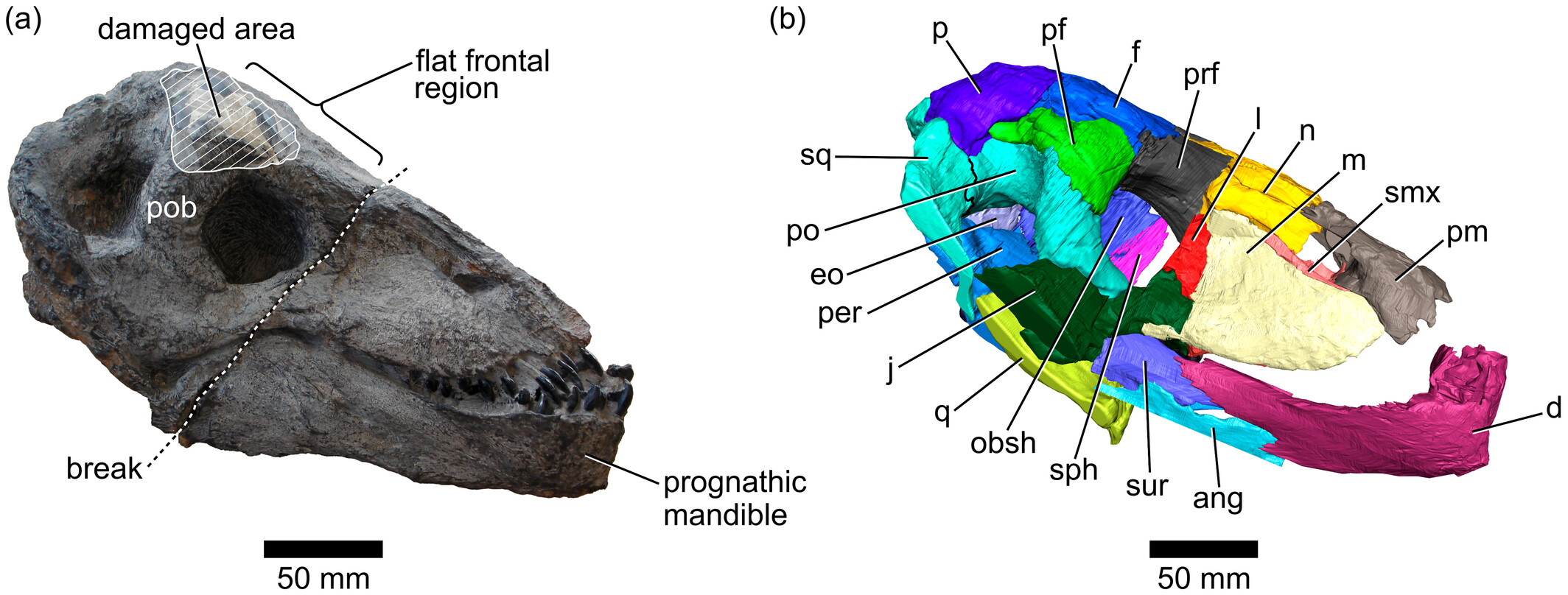
- AM 4950, a subadult M. whaitsi skull

Scientific classification
- Kingdom: Animalia
- Phylum: Chordata
- Clade: Synapsida
- Clade: Therapsida
- Suborder: †Dinocephalia
- Family: †Tapinocephalidae
- Genus: †Moschognathus; Broom, 1914
- Species: †M. whaitsi

Binomial name
- †Moschognathus whaitsi Broom, 1914

Synonyms
- ?Struthionops intermedius Boonstra, 1952

= Moschognathus =

Moschognathus Temporal range: Middle Permian, Capitanian ~265–260 Ma

Extinct genus of therapsids that lived in the Guadalupian epoch

Moschognathus is an extinct genus of dinocephalian therapsid in the family Tapinocephalidae. The genus includes only the type species M. whaitsi, named by palaeontologist Robert Broom in 1914. It was a short-snouted tapinocephalid, closely related to and resembling the well-known genus Moschops, but its skull is less thickened overall has a relatively longer and shallower snout by comparison. Indeed, Moschognathus has typically been regarded as a junior synonym of Moschops (e.g. by King, 1988 and Atayman et al., 2009) since 1969 after Lieuwe Dirk Boonstra sunk Moschognathus into Moschops, albeit retained as its own doubtfully valid species. However, researchers in the 21st century have expressed doubt over this synonymy and suggested that Moschognathus is a distinct taxon after all, including first by Christian Kammerer in a 2009 Ph.D. thesis and formally in 2015 by Alessandra D. S. Boos and colleagues (including Kammerer) in 2015. Moschognathus has since began to re-enter scientific literature of dinocephalians as a valid name and treated distinct from Moschops.

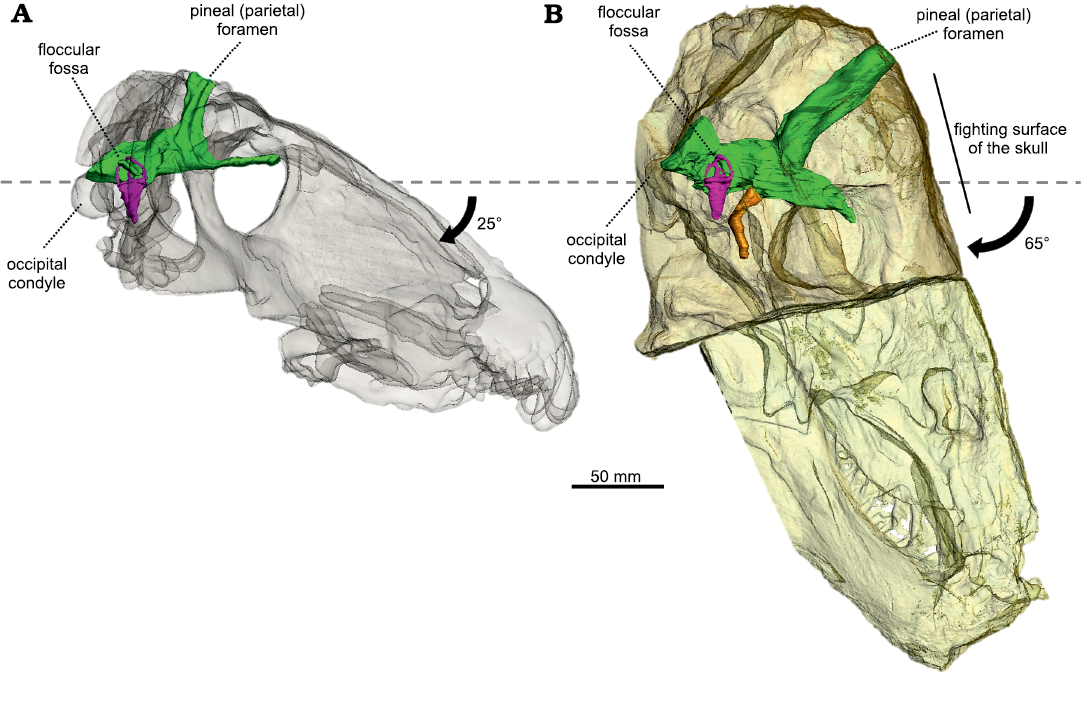
Semi-transparent 3D reconstruction of a referred skull of Moschognathus (AM 4950, right) with that of a juvenile Anteosaurus (left), showing the size and shape of the brain and inner ears.

The holotype specimen, AMNH FARB 5602, is a partial skeleton including the upper jaw tips, mandibles, vertebrae (including a complete cervical series from the neck), ribs, and the right pelvis and femur. In addition to the holotype specimen, a complete skull and mandibles have tentatively been assigned to Moschognathus. This specimen, AM 4950, was initially identified as a juvenile Anteosaurus prior to preparation, but was subsequently identified as a subadult Moschops by Julien Benoit and colleagues in 2016 and again in 2017. This skull was argued to belong instead to Moschognathus in a Ph.D. thesis by Saniye Neumann, and this proposal was formally adopted in subsequent literature. A detailed description of this skull was published in 2025.

== Palaeobiology ==
Tooth replacement in M. whaitsi took place in an alternating pattern, as evidenced by two different generations of teeth found in the maxillary and mandibular tooth rows of a fossil of M. whaitsi.

A palaeopathological juvenile specimen of M. whaitsi has been found suggesting that juveniles of the species engaged in play fighting.
