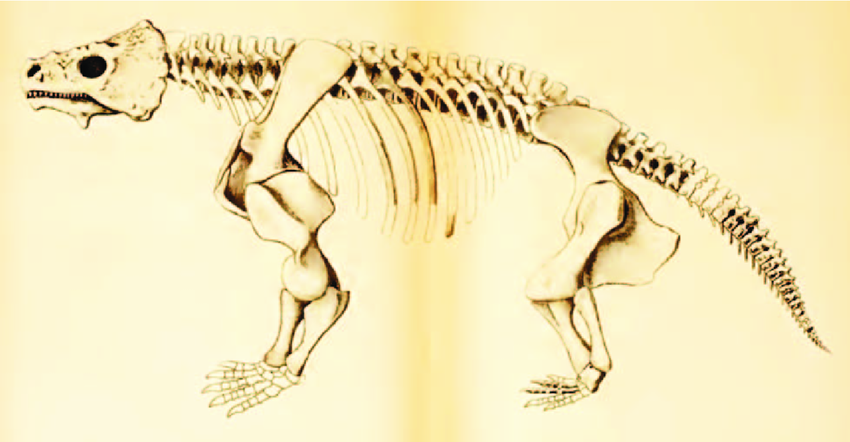
- Image of the full body holotype of Embrithosaurus

Scientific classification
- Kingdom: Animalia
- Phylum: Chordata
- Class: Reptilia
- Clade: †Pareiasauria
- Family: †Pareiasauridae
- Genus: †Embrithosaurus; Watson, 1914

Type species
- †Embrithosaurus schwarzi Watson, 1914

Species
- †E. alexanderi Haughton and Boonstra, 1929; †E. schwarzi Watson, 1914; †E. strubeni Broom, 1924

Synonyms
- Brachypareia watsoni Haughton and Boonstra, 1929; Bradysaurus strubeni Boonstra, 1969; Bradysaurus watsoni Haughton and Boonstra, 1929; Dolichopareia angusta Haughton and Boonstra, 1929; Embrithosaurus angustus Haughton and Boonstra, 1929; Nochelesaurus angustus Haughton and Boonstra, 1929; Pareiasaurus bombidens Seeley, 1888

= Embrithosaurus =

Embrithosaurus Temporal range: 265–260 Ma

Extinct genus of reptiles

Embrithosaurus was a pareiasaur from the Permian of South Africa.

== Description ==
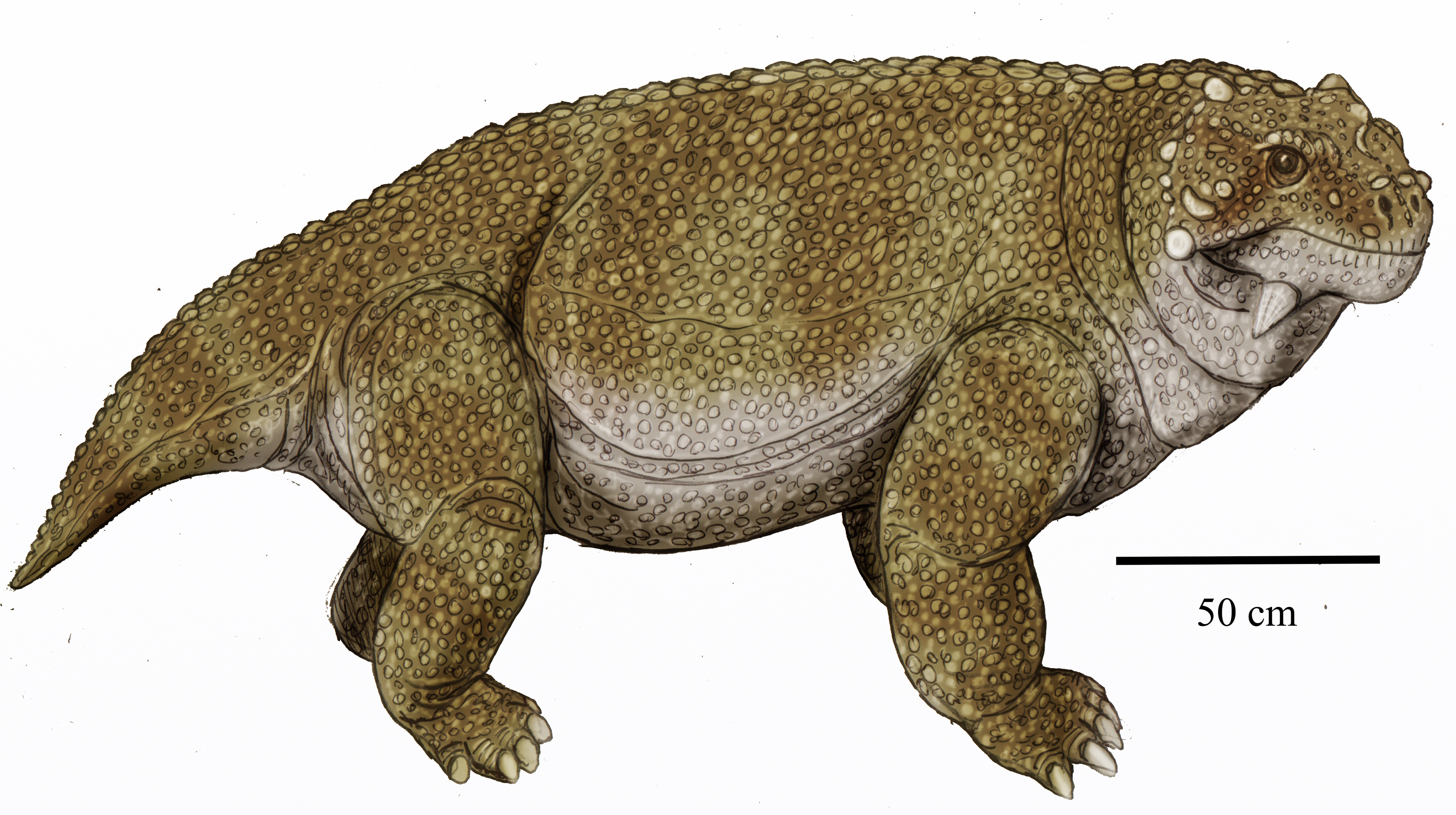
Life restoration

Embrithosaurus was 3 metres (9 ft 10 in) in length and 600 kilograms (1,300 lb) in weight. The skull is relatively deep and narrow. The body is lightly armoured with thin, smooth dermal scutes.

== Species ==
- E. schwarzi (Watson, 1914). The type species. This is the most advanced species of this genus, as indicated by the teeth, which have nine cusps (in three groups of three). In cladistic analyses it is used as the monotypal species for the genus.
- E. alexanderi (Haughton and Boonstra, 1929). This species was made the type for "Dolichopareia". As the name indicates, the skull is long and narrow. This would seem to indicate a different lifestyle or diet to other pareiasaurs. More recently, it has been used as the monotypal species for the genus Nochelesaurus (it is not clear what the status of Embrithosaurus strubeni is, this may be a further transitional species). In cladistic analyses, this species is phylogenetically intermediate between Bradysaurus seeleyi and Embrithosaurus schwarzi.
- E. strubeni (Broom, 1924). The skull is large and deep, pointed at the front, and elevated in the jugal region. This species was originally made the type species of Nochelosaurus by Haughton and Boonstra. Boonstra later (1969) moved it into the genus Bradysaurus, on the basis of the primitive tooth structure. Kuhn however considers it belongs under Embrithosaurus.
