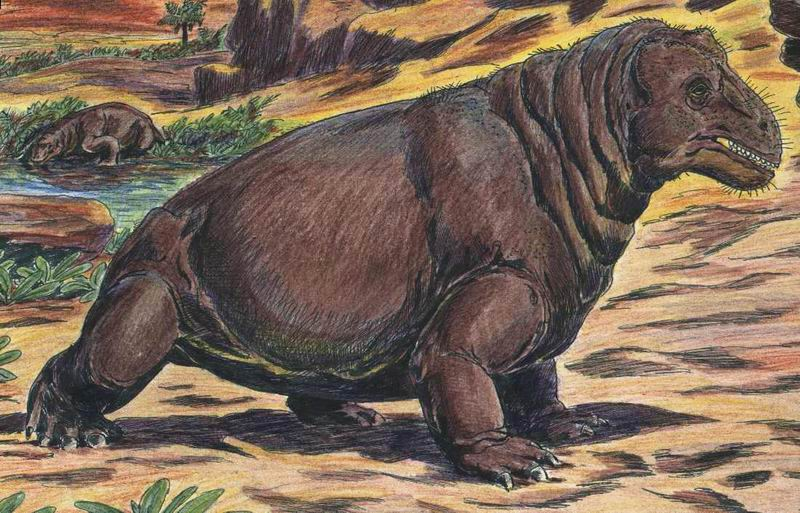
- Illustration of Mormosaurus

Scientific classification
- Kingdom: Animalia
- Phylum: Chordata
- Clade: Synapsida
- Clade: Therapsida
- Suborder: †Dinocephalia
- Family: †Tapinocephalidae
- Genus: †Mormosaurus; Watson, 1914

Species
- †M. seeleyi

= Mormosaurus =

Mormosaurus Temporal range: Permian, Guadalupian epoch

Extinct genus of therapsids

Mormosaurus ("Mormo's Lizard") is an extinct genus of tapinocephalid dinocephalian therapsid from the Guadalupian epoch of South Africa. It was first named by Watson in 1914, and contains one species, M. seeleyi. Individuals of Mormosaurus had a long skull. Its taxonomic status is not settled, as Mormosaurus may be congeneric with Tapinocephalus.

== See also ==
- List of therapsids
