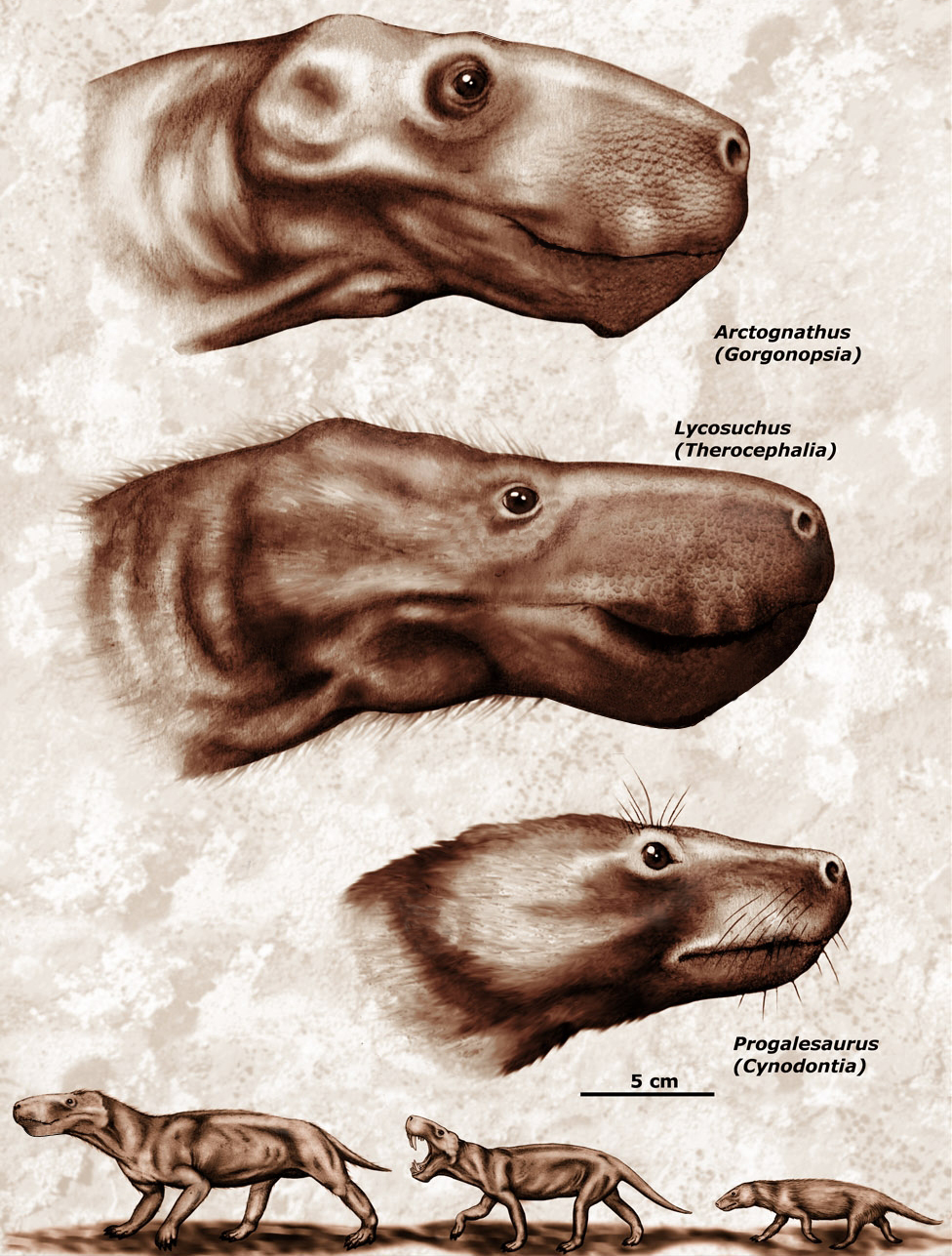
- Restoration of three genera of the theriodont clade: Arctognathus (Gorgonopsia), Lycosuchus (Therocephalia) and Progalesaurus (Cynodontia).

Scientific classification
- Kingdom: Animalia
- Phylum: Chordata
- Clade: Synapsida
- Clade: Therapsida
- Clade: Theriodontia; Owen, 1876

Groups
- †Gorgonopsia; Eutheriodontia

= Theriodontia =

Theriodonts Temporal range: Middle Permian–Holocene, 270–0 Ma Possible latest Early Permian origin

Clade of therapsids

The theriodonts (clade Theriodontia (Note: Greek: "the ones with beast teeth", referring to more mammal-like teeth)) are a major group of therapsids which appeared during the Middle Permian and which includes the gorgonopsians and the eutheriodonts, itself including the therocephalians and the cynodonts.

== Naming ==
In 1876, Richard Owen named a suborder Theriodontia, which he divided into the Cynodontia and the Gomphodontia. In 1956, D. M. S. Watson and Alfred Romer divided Therapsida into Theriodontia, which predominantly included carnivorous species, and the mostly herbivorous Anomodontia, defined as comprising Dinocephalia as well as Venyukovioidea and Dicynodontia.

The modern clade concept was devised by James Allen Hopson. In his system, Theriodontia fall into two main groups: the Gorgonopsia and the Eutheriodontia. The latter consist of the Therocephalia and Cynodontia.

== Evolution ==
Theriodonts appear in the fossil record at the same time as their sister group within the Neotherapsida, the Anomodontia, about 270 million years ago, in the Middle Permian. Even these early theriodonts were more mammal-like than their anomodont and dinocephalian contemporaries.

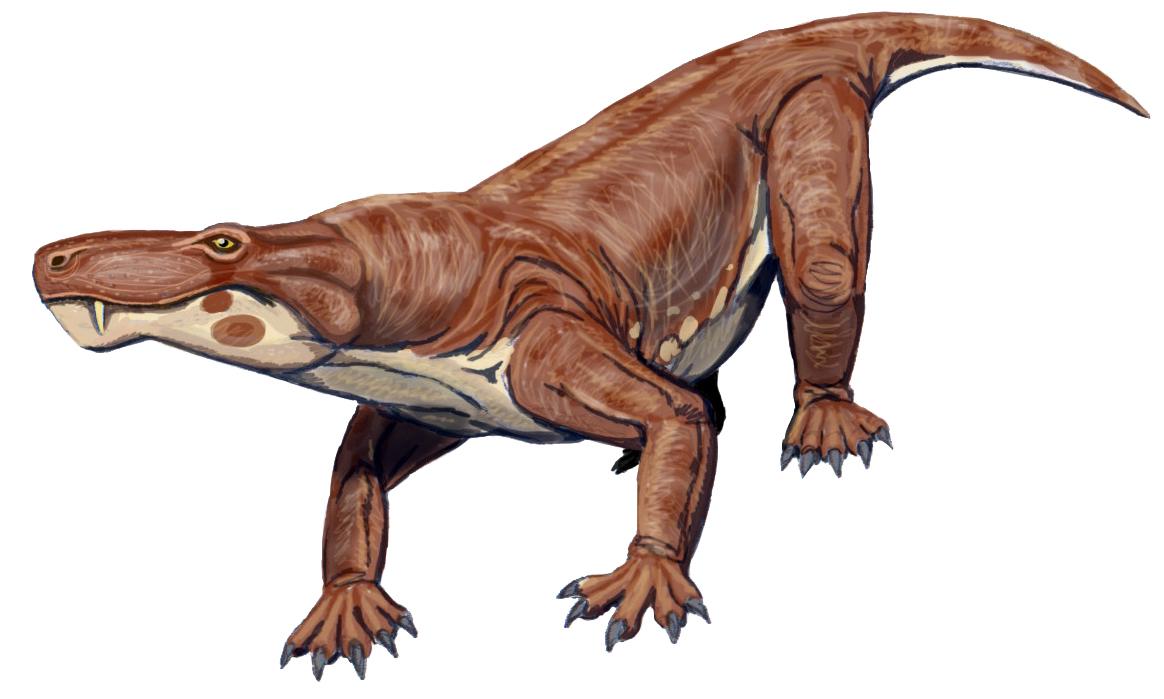
Scylacosaurus.

Early theriodonts may have been endothermic. Early forms were carnivorous, but several later groups became herbivorous during the Triassic. Theriodont jaws were more mammal-like than was the case of other therapsids, because their dentary was larger, which gave them more efficient chewing ability. Furthermore, several other bones that were on the lower jaw (found in reptiles), moved into the ears, allowing the theriodonts to hear better and their mouths to open wider. This made the theriodonts the most successful group of synapsids.

=== Eutheriodontia ===
Eutheriodontia refers to all theriodonts except the gorgonopsians. They included the therocephalians and the cynodonts. While the monophyly of Theriodontia as a whole is not certain, Eutheriodontia has been strongly supported as a clade, with the cynodonts being either a sister group to the therocephalians or evolving from within them. The cynodonts include the mammals. The eutheriodonts have larger skulls, accommodating larger brains and improved jaw muscles.

Both therocephalians and cynodonts survived the Permian–Triassic extinction event. While early therocephalians were carnivorous and occupied similar niches to gorgonopsians, later forms included small carnivores, insectivores and herbivores. Of the latter, the convergently mammal-like bauriamorphs underwent a radiation in the Triassic. The remaining theriodonts, the cynodonts, also included carnivores, as well as newly evolved herbivores (Traversodontidae). While traversodontids for the most part remained medium-sized to reasonably large (the length of the largest species was up to two meters), the carnivorous forms became progressively smaller as the Triassic progressed. They "miniaturised". By the Late Triassic, the small cynodonts included the rodent-like Tritylodontidae (possibly related to or descended from traversodontids), and the tiny, shrew-like, Tritheledontidae, related to the Mammaliaformes. The tritheledontids died out during the Jurassic, and the tritylodontids survived into the Cretaceous, but their relatives, the mammals, continued to evolve. Many mammal groups managed to survive the Cretaceous–Paleogene extinction event, which wiped out the non-avian dinosaurs, allowing the mammals to diversify.

== Taxonomy ==
=== Classification ===
- Order Therapsida
  - Theriodontia
    - Suborder †Gorgonopsia
      - Family †Gorgonopsidae
    - Eutheriodontia
      - Suborder †Therocephalia
        - Family †Lycosuchidae
        - (unranked) †Scylacosauria
          - Family †Scylacosauridae
          - Infraorder †Eutherocephalia
            - Family †Hofmeyriidae
            - Family †Moschorhinidae
            - Family †Whaitsiidae
            - Superfamily †Baurioidea
              - Family †Bauriidae
              - Family †Ericiolacteridae
              - Family †Ictidosuchidae
                - Genus †Ictidosuchoides
                - Genus †Ictidosuchus
              - Family †Ictidosuchopsidae
              - Family †Lycideopidae
      - Suborder Cynodontia

=== Phylogenetics of Theriodontia ===
- Therapsida
  - †Biarmosuchia
    - †Eotitanosuchia
  - †Dinocephalia
  - †Anomodontia
  - Theriodontia
    - †Gorgonopsia
    - †Therocephalia
    - Cynodontia
      - †Dviniidae
      - Mammalia
      - †Procynosuchidae
      - †Galesauridae
      - †Thrinaxodontidae
      - †Cynognathidae
      - †Gomphodontia
      - †Chiniquodontidae
      - †Probainognathidae
      - †Tritheledontidae (Ictidosauria)

== See also ==
- Evolution of mammals
- Anomodonts
- Timeline of evolution
