= Yuri Denisyuk =

Soviet physicist (1927–2006)

- Born: Yuri Nikolayevich Denisyuk; 27 July 1927; Sochi, Soviet Union
- Died: 14 May 2006 (aged 78); Saint Petersburg, Russia
- Education: SPbNRU ITMO
- Known for: creator of 3D holography, Denisyuk's Scheme
- Awards: Lenin Prize (1970), International Film Organization Prize “Intercamera” (1971), The Order of the Badge of Honour (1975), USSR State Prize (1982, 1989), The International Dennis Gabor Award (1983), Great Silver Medal and Honorary Member of Royal Photographic Association of Great Britain (1987), Order of the Red Banner of Labour (1988), R. W. Wood Prize (1992), Honorary Doctor of De Montfort University in Great Britain (1999)
- Scientific career
- Fields: Physics (Optics)

Yuri Nikolayevich Denisyuk (Russian: Юрий Николаевич Денисюк; 27 July 1927 in Sochi – 14 May 2006 in Saint Petersburg) was a Russian physicist and one of the founders of optical holography in the former Soviet Union. He is known for his great contribution to holography, in particular for the so-called "Denisyuk hologram". He was a full member of the Russian Academy of Sciences (1992; corresponding member since 1970), doctor of physical and mathematical sciences (1971, candidate of sciences since 1964), professor (1980).

== Biography ==
Yuri Denisyuk spent his youth in Leningrad and was in the city during the Siege of Leningrad. His scientific work started in 1954 (after his graduation from Saint Petersburg National Research University of Information Technologies, Mechanics and Optics) at Vavilov State Optical Institute. At that time he was inspired by the science fiction novel Stellar Ships by the Soviet writer and paleontologist Ivan Yefremov (where it was written about a three-dimensional image of alien head emerged in the ancient disc made of unknown material), and remarkable experiments by 1908 Nobel Prize laureate Gabriel Lippmann. In 1958, in other words before the times when lasers with their coherent light were invented, he started conducting his own experiments, where he used lamp emission on mercury vapor and was first to demonstrate 3D hologram. Starting from 1971 Y.N. Denisyuk was the head of the Laboratory of holography at Vavilov State Optical Institute, later he was the head of the whole department, engaged in holographic researches. Since 1988 he has also been the head of the Laboratory of holography at Ioffe Physical-Technical Institute of the Russian Academy of Sciences. He published about 240 research papers, which includes 35 inventions.

== Scientific work ==
Yuri Denisyuk's scientific work dealt primarily with physical optics, most notably holography. In 1962 Denisyuk invented the method of image recording in three-dimensional environments allowing one to save information about phase, amplitude, and the spectral structure of the wave coming from an object. These holograms can be produced using a typical beam of white light.

Denisyuk received the Lenin Prize in 1970, upon receipt of the prize he was selected as a member of the Academy of Sciences of the Soviet Union, and appointed as a head of the newly established Laboratory of holography at Vavilov State Optical Institute. He proceeded to study the principles of dynamic holography for which he was awarded the 1982 USSR State Prize. He also participated in the establishment of a system for processing radar impulses using holography for which he was awarded the 1989 USSR State Prize. Denisyuk showed that progressive waves possess reflective properties, solving a problem with holograms formed in experiments with colliding beams. A great deal of his scientific work was dedicated to examination of quasi-deep holograms (the specific one-dimensional structure) and selectograms (a new type of periodic three-dimensional environment). Under Denisyuk's supervision a range of new light-sensitive materials including reoksan, capillary porous glass, and various composite materials were developed for use as holographic recording media.

== Awards ==
- Lenin Prize (1970)
- International Film Organization Prize "Intercamera" (1971)
- Order of the Badge of Honour (1975)
- USSR State Prize (1982, 1989)
- International Dennis Gabor Award (1983)
- Great Silver Medal and Honorary Member of Royal Photographic Association of Great Britain (1987)
- Order of the Red Banner of Labour (1988)
- R. W. Wood Prize (1992)
- Honorary Doctor of De Monfort University in Great Britain (1999)
