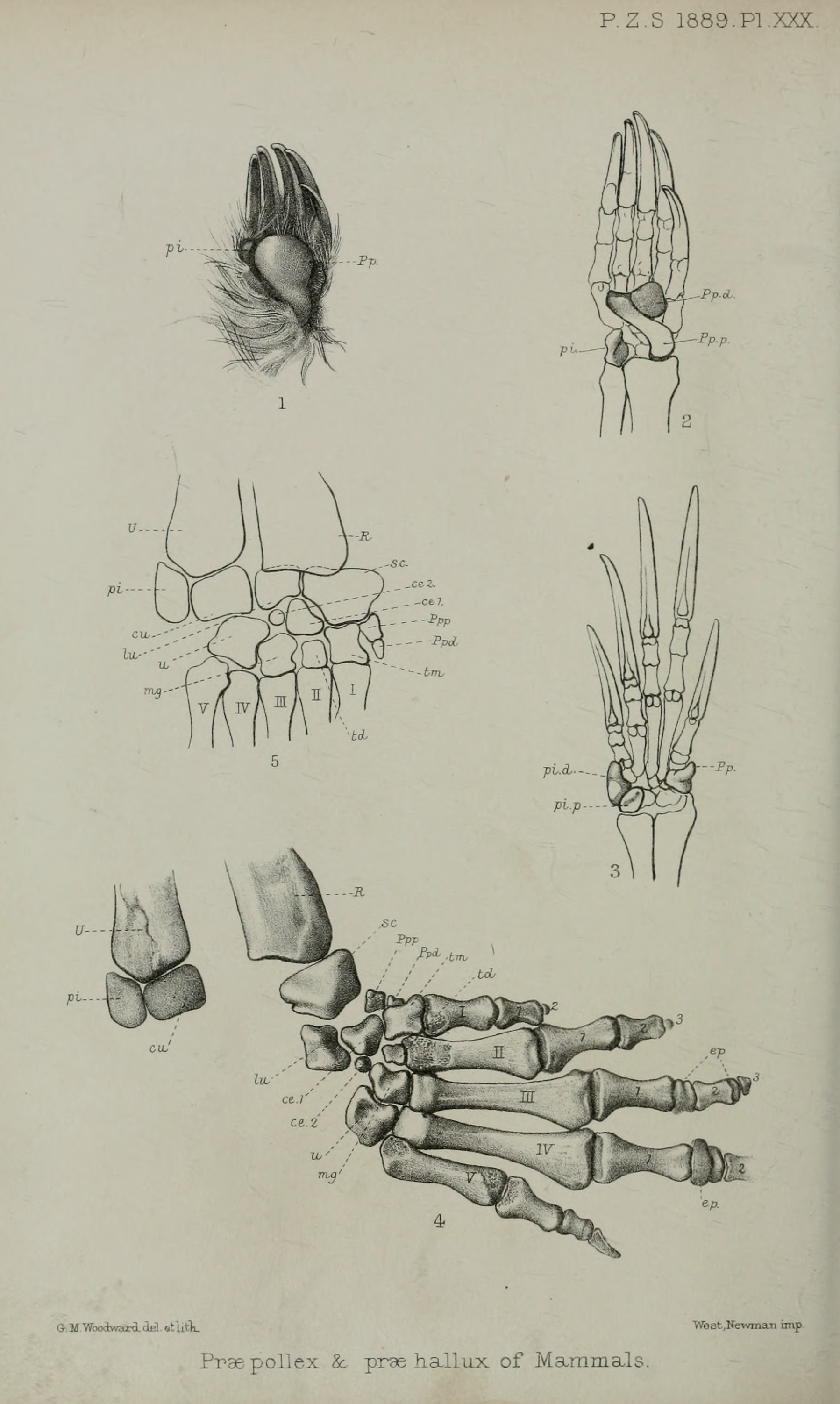

Scientific classification
- Domain: Eukaryota
- Kingdom: Animalia
- Phylum: Chordata
- Clade: Synapsida
- Clade: Therapsida
- Clade: †Therocephalia
- Genus: †Theriodesmus; Seeley, 1887

Type species
- †T. phylarcus Seeley, 1888

= Theriodesmus =

Theriodesmus Temporal range: Middle Permian 266 Ma

Extinct genus of therapsids from Permian South Africa

Theriodesmus is an extinct genus of Therocephalian found in South Africa.
