= Jugend und Technik =

Popular science magazine in East Germany (1953–1991)

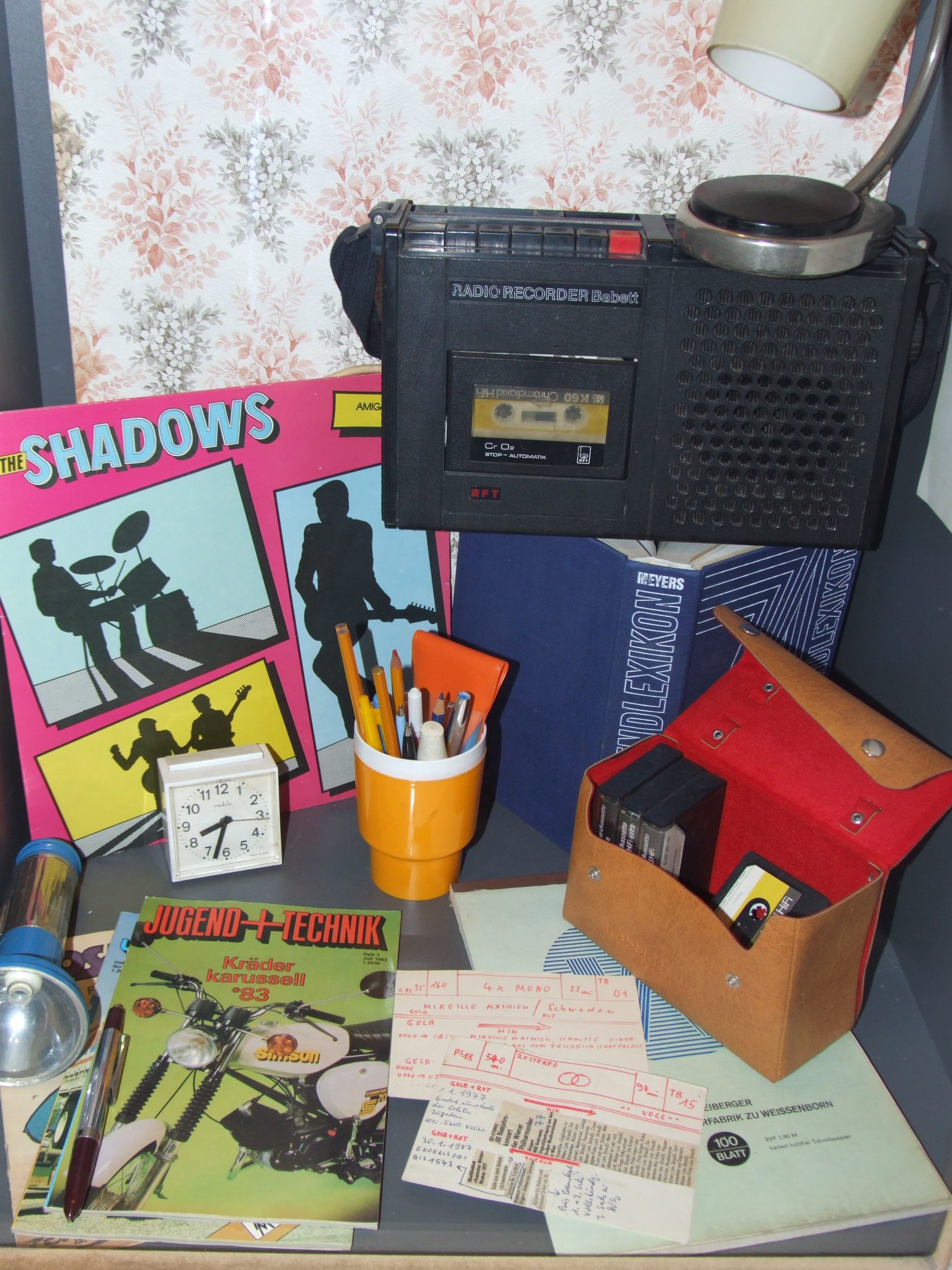
- An issue of the magazine exhibited at the DDR Museum
- Categories: Popular science magazine; Technology magazine
- Frequency: Monthly
- Publisher: Junge Welt Verlag
- Founded: 1953
- First issue: February 1953
- Final issue: 1991
- Country: East Germany
- Based in: East Berlin
- Language: German
- ISSN: 0022-5878
- OCLC: 634760906

Jugend und Technik (German: Youth and Technology), also stylized as Jugend + Technik, was an East German popular science and technology magazine targeting youth. Its subtitle was das faszinierende Technikmagazin (German: the fascinating technology magazine). The magazine appeared between 1953 and 1991 and was headquartered in East Berlin.

== History and profile ==
Jugend und Technik was started in 1951, and its first issue was published in February that year. It was based in East Berlin and came out monthly. Its publisher was the Junge Welt Verlag.

From its start in 1953 Jugend und Technik published science fiction material one of which was the German translation of Ivan Yefremov's Tumannost’ Andromedy (Russian: Andromeda). This work was originally published in the Soviet Union in 1957, and its censored German version was serialized in Jugend und Technik in 1958. The magazine featured articles in German and Russian during the 1960s. A conference on science fiction was organized by the editors of Jugend und Technik in 1966. It carried out a survey to identify the gender of the readers of science fiction in 1969 and found that they were male high school and university students and older intellectuals working in science- and technology-related fields.

Earliest articles on computer technology were published in Jugend und Technik which continued to feature them until the 1980s when computer magazines began to appear in East Germany. The magazine offered ways to construct home computers through the DIY practices in 1987. Another frequent theme covered by the magazine was space-related topics.

Jugend und Technik folded in 1991.
