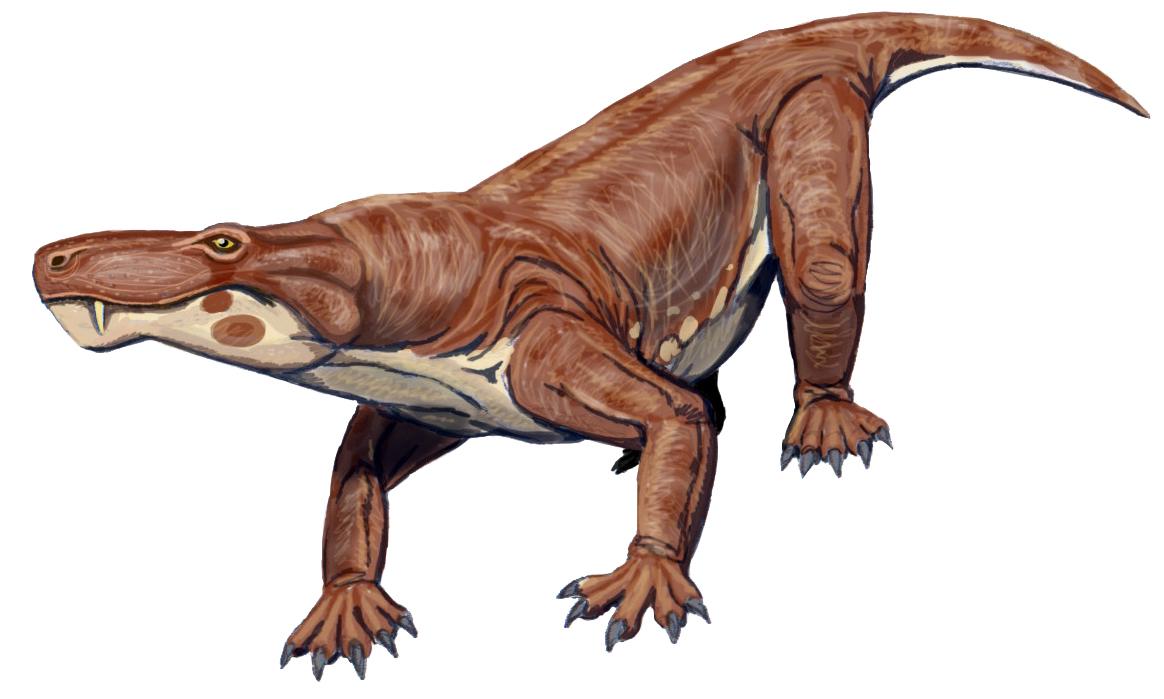
- Life restoration of the therocephalian Scylacosaurus
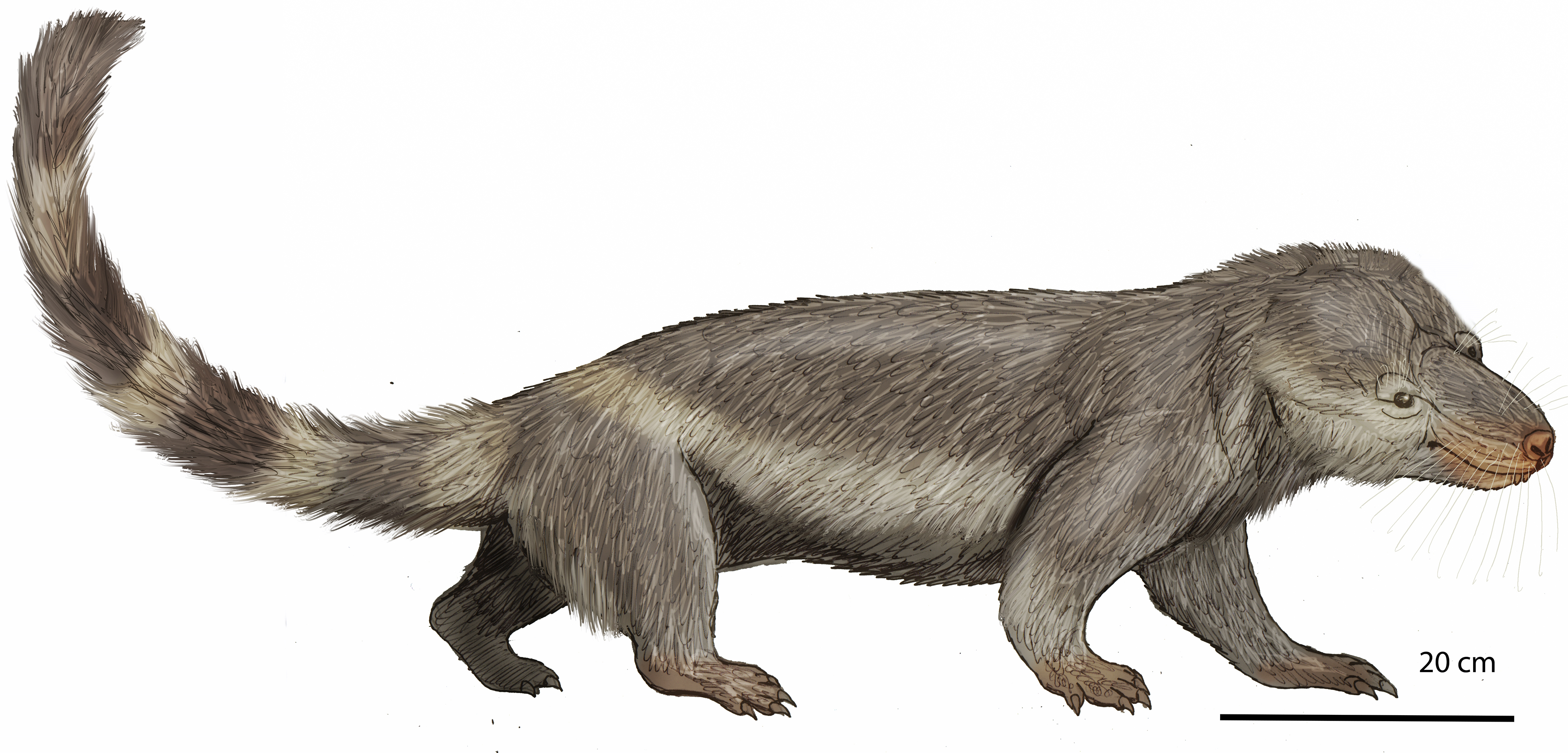
- Life restoration of the cynodont Tritylodon

Scientific classification
- Kingdom: Animalia
- Phylum: Chordata
- Clade: Synapsida
- Clade: Therapsida
- Clade: Theriodontia
- Clade: Eutheriodontia; Hopson & Barghusen, 1986

Subgroups
- †Therocephalia; Cynodontia (including mammals)

= Eutheriodontia =

Eutheriodonts Temporal range: Middle Permian-Recent, 266–0 Ma

Clade of therapsids

Eutheriodontia is a clade of therapsids which appear during the Middle Permian and which includes therocephalians and cynodonts, this latter group including mammals and related forms.

With the dicynodonts, they form one of two lineages of therapsids that survived the End-Permian extinction and which diversified again during the Triassic, before the majority of them disappeared before or during the Triassic–Jurassic extinction, except for a lineage of cynodonts that later gave rise to mammals.

== Classification ==
The clade was named in 1986 by James Allen Hopson and Herbert Richard Barghusen, the name meaning the "true Theriodontia". Within Hopson's system, the Eutheriodontia are the sister group of the Gorgonopsia within the Theriodontia. A close relationship between therocephalians and cynodonts had been recognized for many years. In 2001 the Eutheriodontia were defined as the least inclusive clade including Mammalia and Bauria. Even today, the taxon has a strong recognition among paleontologists and is regularly cited in several studies concerning therapsids.

== Evolutionary history and characteristics ==
The therocephalians and cynodonts are thought to have diverged in the Middle Permian, and each group independently evolved mammal-like features, including a secondary palate and the loss of a postorbital bar (these features were retained in mammals, which are considered a derived group of cynodonts). Mammalian features that both groups inherited from a common ancestor include the loss of teeth on the palate, the expansion of the epipterygoid bone at the base of the skull (an area called the alisphenoid in mammals), and the narrowing of the skull roof to a narrow sagittal crest running between large temporal openings.
