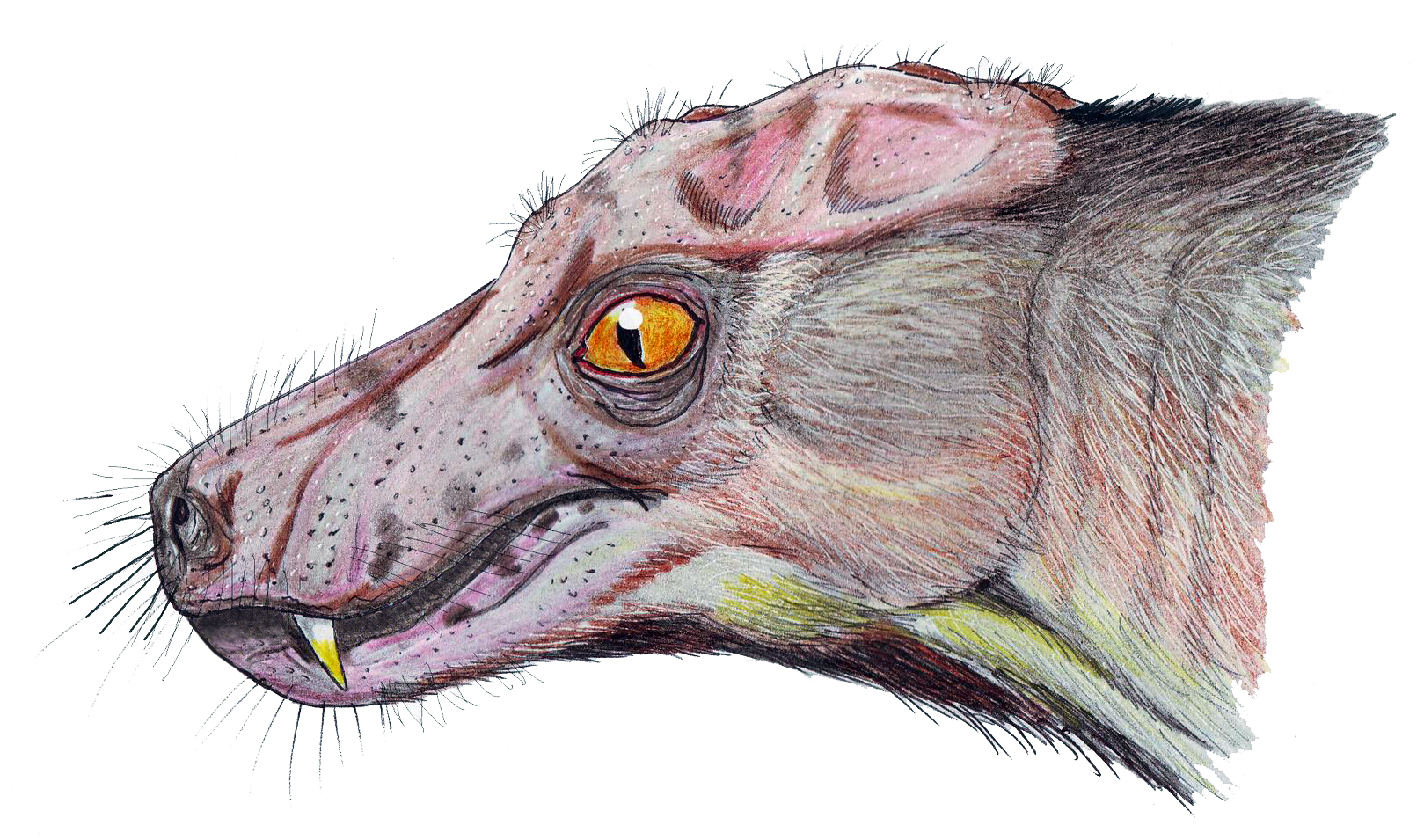
- Life restoration of Porosteognathus efremovi

Scientific classification
- Kingdom: Animalia
- Phylum: Chordata
- Clade: Synapsida
- Clade: Therapsida
- Clade: †Therocephalia
- Clade: †Scylacosauria van den Heever, 1994

Subgroups
- †Scylacosauridae; †Eutherocephalia

= Scylacosauria =

Scylacosauria Temporal range: Middle Permian - Middle Triassic

Extinct clade of therapsids

Scylacosauria is a clade of therocephalian therapsids. It includes the basal family Scylacosauridae and the infraorder Eutherocephalia. Scylacosauridae and Eutherocephalia form this clade to the exclusion of Lycosuchidae, the most basal therocephalian family. Thus, Scylacosauria includes all therocephalians except lycosuchids. Below is a cladogram showing the phylogenetic position of Scylacosauria:

- Therocephalia
  - Lycosuchidae
  - Scylacosauria
    - Scylacosauridae
    - Eutherocephalia
