= Ivan Yefremov =

Soviet paleontologist, science-fiction author and social thinker

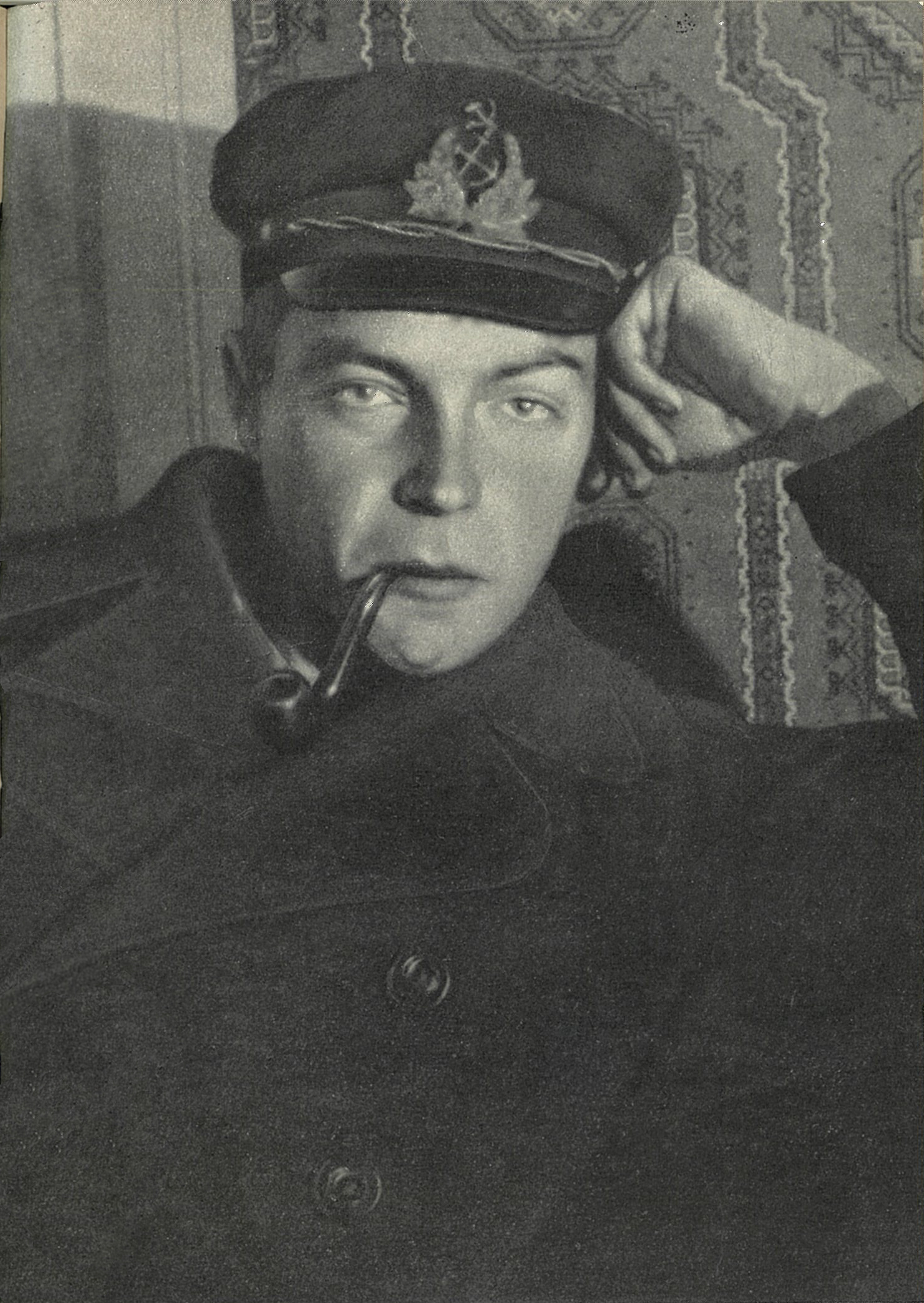
- Born: Ivan Antipovich Yefremov; 23 April 1908; Gatchinsky District, Saint Petersburg Governorate, Russian Empire
- Died: 5 October 1972 (aged 64); Moscow, RSFSR, Soviet Union
- Education: Leningrad Mining Institute
- Occupations: Paleontologist, writer
- Writing career
- Language: Russian
- Genres: Science fiction, historical novel
- Subject: Palaeontology

Ivan Antonovich (Antipovich) Yefremov (sometimes transliterated as Efremov; Russian: Ива́н Анто́нович (Анти́пович) Ефре́мов; 23 April 1908 – 5 October 1972) was a Soviet paleontologist, science-fiction author and social thinker. He founded taphonomy, the study of fossilization patterns.

== Biography ==
He was born in the village of Vyritsa in Saint Petersburg Governorate on 23 April 1908. His parents divorced during the Russian Revolution. His mother married a Red Army commander and left the children in Kherson to be cared for by an aunt who soon died of typhus. Yefremov survived on his own for some time, after which he joined a Red Army unit as a "son of the regiment" and went to Perekop with it. In 1921, he was discharged and went to Petrograd (now Saint Petersburg) to study. He completed his education there while combining his studies with a variety of odd jobs. He later commented that "the Revolution was also my own liberation from philistinism" (Russian: "Революция была также и моим освобождением от мещанства").

== Academic career ==
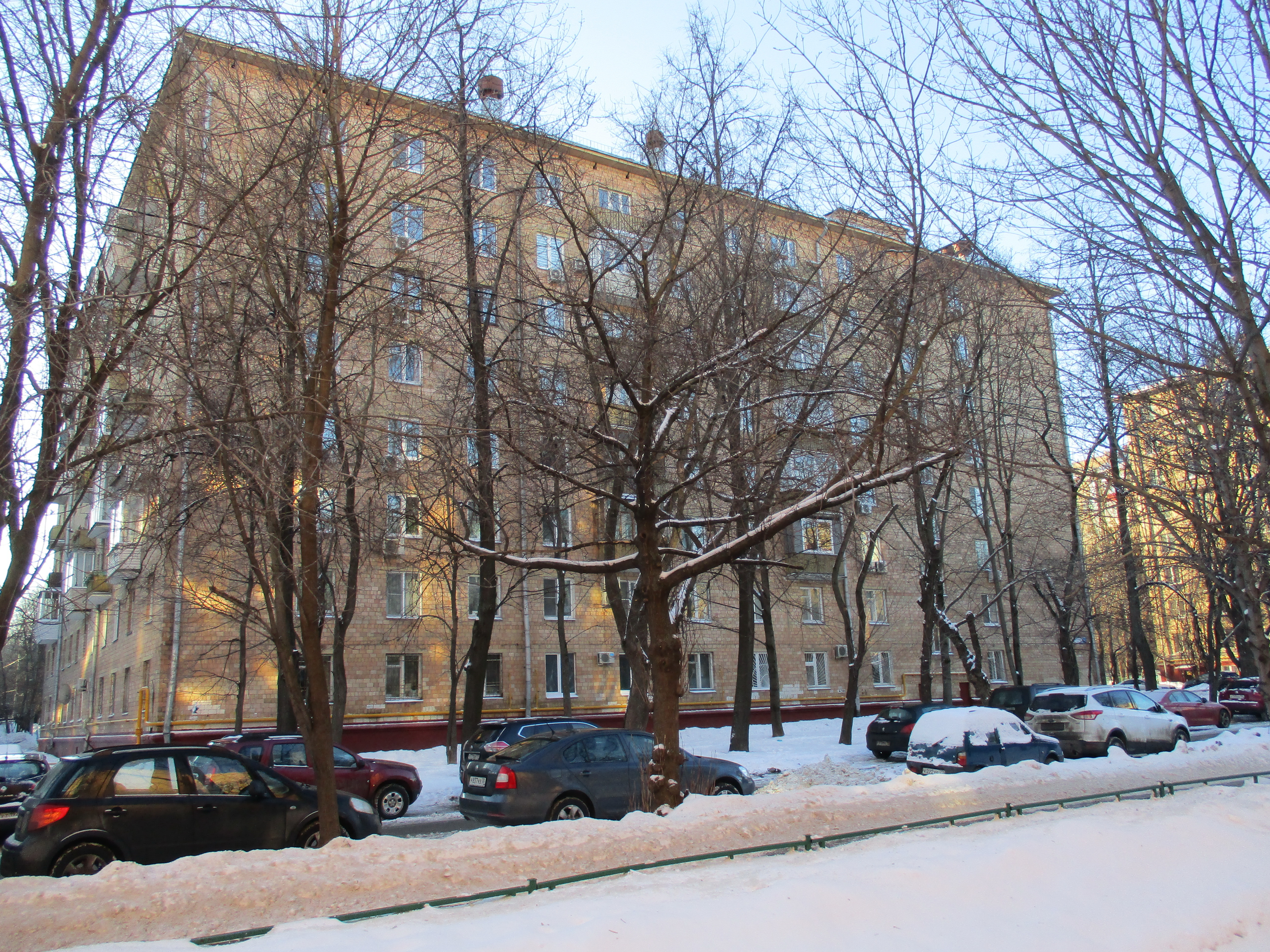
House 4 at the Gubkin Street in Moscow, where Yefremov lived from 1962 until death

In 1924, due to the influence of academician Petr Sushkin, he became interested in paleontology. Yefremov entered the Leningrad State University but dropped out later. As early as 19, he made several discoveries and published a monograph co-authored with Alexey Bystrow, which was later awarded by the Linnean Society of London.

In the mid-1930s, he took part in several palaeontological expeditions to the Volga region, the Urals, and Central Asia. He headed a research laboratory at the Institute of Paleontology. In 1935, he took exit examinations and graduated from the Leningrad Mining Institute. The same year he got his Candidate of Science degree in biological sciences. In 1941, he got his doctorate in biological sciences. In 1943 he received the title of Professor.

In the 1940s, Yefremov developed a new scientific field called taphonomy, for which he was awarded the Stalin Prize in 1952. His book, Taphonomy, was published in 1950. He applied many taphonomic principles in his fieldwork during a palaeontological expedition to the Gobi Desert in Mongolia. During these years, he was recognized as a successful scientist and won a state science award. Many American researchers called Yefremov the father of modern paleontology, who merged geological and palaeontological data into a single science.

In 1958 he visited China.

== Literary career ==
Yefremov wrote his first work of fiction, a short story, in 1944. His first novel The Land of Foam (Great Arc, 1946) was published in 1946. The subsequent novel Road of Winds was based on his scientific expeditions in Mongolia (1946–1949). Yefremov's most widely recognized science fiction novel, Andromeda Nebula, came out in 1957. It is a panegyric to a utopian "communist" future. It shows a society developed so that there is no material inequality between individuals, and each person is able to pursue their self-development unrestricted. An intergalactic communication system binds mankind into a commonwealth of sentient civilizations of the universe, the Great Ring of Civilizations. The book became a moral guideline for many people in the Soviet Union. Besides the heavy didactic aspect, the book also contained an interesting space travel adventure subplot, so people appreciated it for its educational and entertainment value. Algis Budrys compared Yefremov's fiction style to that of Hugo Gernsback. With the time the socio-political circumstances in the world became more and more worrying, and such changes are reflected in the novel The Bull's Hour. In it Yefremov tries to warn of coming catastrophes in environment, ethics and the social sphere. Many considered the novel a disguised criticism of the USSR, although later researchers have found that novel mostly shows the dead-end perspectives of Maoism and gangster capitalism. The government accused the novel of Anti-Sovietism and banned it from publishing up to the end of the 1980s.

Yefremov's last novel was Thais of Athens, published in 1972. The narrative is set in the time of Alexander the Great. Its multiple topics include little-known female cults, questions of women's inner lives and their roles in global history; it raises questions of religion, cultural genesis, and the search for beauty and truth.

== Personal life ==
Yefremov was married three times. His first marriage in the early 1930s, to Ksenia Svitalskaya, was short-lived and ended in divorce. In 1936, he married paleontologist Elena Dometevna Konzhukova, with whom they had a son, Allan Ivanovich Yefremov. After his wife died on 1 August 1961, he married Taisiya Iosifovna Yukhnevskaya in 1962. His last novel Thais of Athens, which was posthumously published in 1973, is dedicated to her.

== Honours and awards ==
- Order of the Red Banner of Labour (1945) — for achievements in palaeopathology;
- Order of the Red Banner of Labour (1967) — for achievements in development of Russian literature
- Order of the Badge of Honour
- Stalin Prize (1952) — for the book "Taphonomy and Geological fasti"

A minor planet 2269 Efremiana discovered in 1976 by Soviet astronomer Nikolai Chernykh is named after him.

Prehistoric animals named after Yefremov:

- Bainoceratops efremovi, a Late Cretaceous ceratopsian from Mongolia
- Cyclurus efremovi, a Late Paleocene fish discovered in Mongolia
- Dongusuchus efremovi, a Middle Triassic archosaur from Orenburg, Russia
- Euxinita efremovi, a Carboniferous foraminiferan from Europe
- Tarbosaurus efremovi, a Late Cretaceous theropod discovered in Ömnögov, Mongolia.
- Syodon efremovi, a Middle Permian therapsid from Isheevo locality, Tatarstan.
- The primitive therapsid Ivantosaurus was discovered by Petr Chudinov and named after his tutor Yefremov.
- Ivanantonia efremovi, an Early Eocene rodent from Mongolia
- Kargalichthys efremovi, an Early Permian fish from Russia
- Mesenosaurus efremovi, an Early Permian tetrapod, named after Yefremov who named the genus in 1938.
- Mongolochelys efremovi, a Late Cretaceous turtle from Mongolia
- Porosteognathus efremovi, a Middle Permian therapsid from Russia
- Protembolotherium efremovi, a Middle Eocene brontothere from Mongolia
- Wuguia efremovi, an Early Cretaceous turtle from northwest China
- Stegocupes efremovi

== Bibliography ==
=== Fiction ===
Novels

- The Land of Foam (At the Edge of Oikoumene also known as Great Arc, 1946)
- Andromeda: A Space-Age Tale (Andromeda Nebula, 1957, 1959)
- Razor's Edge (1963)
- The Bull's Hour (1968)
- Thais of Athens (Thais Athenian, 1972)

Short fiction

- "Olgoi-Khorkhoi" (1944)
- "A Meeting Over Tuscarora" (1944)
- "Stellar Ships" (1944)
- "Cutty Sark" (1944)
- "The Nur-i-Desht Observatory" (1944)
- "The Heart of the Serpent" (Cor Serpentis, 1958, 1961)
- "The Yurt of the Raven" (1959)
- "Aphaneor, The Arkharkhellen's Daughter" (1959)
- "Five Paintings" (1965)

=== Non-fiction ===
- Road of Winds (1956)

=== Scientific works ===
Ivan Yefremov has written more than 100 scientific works, especially about Permian tetrapods found in Russia, and on taphonomy. Only few of them were published in languages other than Russian. Below is a list of the works published in German or English. Source - the book "Ivan Antonovich Yefremov" by Petr Tchudinov (issued in 1987 by the Publishing House "Nauka", Moscow)

- Bentosaurus sushkini, ein neuer Labyrinthodont aus den Permo-Triassischen Ablagerungen des Scharchenga-Flussess, Nord-Duna Gouvernement, Izvestia Akademii Nauk SSSR (Proceedings of Acad. Sci. USSR. Phys. and Math.), N. 8, P. 757-770 (1929)
- Über die Labyrinthodonten der UdUSSR. II. Permische Labyrinthodonten des früheren Gouvernement Wjatka, Trudy Paleozoologicheskogo Instituta (Proceedings of Paleozoological Institute), Vol. 2, P. 117-158 (1933)
- Some new Permian reptiles of the USSR, Comptes Rendus (Doklady) Acad. Sci. USSR. Paleontol., Vol 19, N 9, P. 771-776 (1938)
- Die Mesen-Fauna der Permischen Reptilien, Neues Jahrb. Min. Geol. Pal., Bd. 84. Abt. B, S.379-466 (1940)
- Kurze Übersicht uber die Formen der Perm- und Trias Tetrapoden - Fauna der UdSSR, Centralbl. Min. Geol., Abt. B. N 12, S. 372-383 (1940)
- Taphonomy: a new branch of Paleontology, Pan-Amer. Geol., Vol. 74, P. 81-93 (1940)
- Ulemosaurus svijagensis Riab. - ein Deinocephale aus den Ablagerungen des Perm der UdSSR, Nove Acta Leopold. (N. F.). Bd 9, S. 155-205 (1940)
- The Godwana system of India, and the live history in the later Paleozoic, J. Paleontol. Soc. India, Lucknow D.N. Wadia Jubilee number, Vol. 2, P. 24-28 (1957)
- Some consideration on biological bases of Paleontology, Vertebr. Palasiatica, Vol 2, N. 2/3, P. 83-99 (1958)

== See also ==
- Yefremov School, movement of Soviet science fiction, 1970s to 1990s
