= Andromeda: A Space-Age Tale =

1957 novel by Ivan Yefremov

- Dust-jacket design of the 1959 English edition
- Author: Ivan Yefremov
- Original title: Туманность Андромеды
- Translator: George Hanna
- Illustrator: Unknown
- Cover artist: Nikolay I. Grishin
- Language: Russian
- Series: The Great Circle
- Genre: Science fiction
- Publisher: Molodaya Gvardiya; Foreign Language Publishing House
- Publication date: 1957
- Publication place: USSR
- English publication date: 1959
- Media type: Print (Hardcover)
- ISBN: 0-8285-1856-4
- OCLC: 469991798
- LC Class: PG3476.E38 T83 1950z and PG3476.E38 T83 1980
- Followed by: "The Heart of the Serpent"

Andromeda: A Space-Age Tale (Russian: "Туманность Андромеды", romanized: Tumannost' Andromedy, lit. 'Andromeda Nebula'), is a science fiction novel by the Soviet writer and paleontologist Ivan Yefremov, written in 1955–1956 and published in 1957. It was translated into English as Andromeda: A Space-Age Tale by George Hanna. The novel predicted some future inventions (borazon, space probe, powered exoskeleton and ion thruster). The German translation of the novel which was highly censored was serialized in the East German popular science magazine Jugend und Technik in 1958. It was made into a film in 1967, The Andromeda Nebula.

Yefremov's 1958 short story "The Heart of the Serpent" and the 1968 novel The Bull's Hour, which are set in the same universe some 200 years later, are considered its sequels.

== Plot summary ==
The book portrays Yefremov's conception of a classic communist utopia set in a distant future. Throughout the novel, the author's attention is focused on the social and cultural aspects of the society, and the struggle to conquer vast cosmic distances. There are several principal heroes, including a starship captain, two scientists, a historian, and an archeologist. Though the world described in the novel is intended to be ideal, there is an attempt to show a conflict and its resolution with a voluntary self-punishment of a scientist whose reckless experiment caused damage. There's also a fair amount of action in the episodes where the crew of the starship fight alien predators.

In the novel, several civilizations across our galaxy, including Earth, are united in the Great Circle, whose members exchange and relay scientific and cultural information. Notably, faster-than-light travel or communication does not exist in the time portrayed in the book, and one of the minor plot lines examines a failed attempt to overcome this limitation. The radio transmissions around the Great Circle are pictured as requiring a tremendous amount of energy, and are thus infrequent.

One of the main plot lines follows the crew of the spacecraft Tantra led by Captain Erg Noor, dispatched to investigate the sudden radio silence of one of the nearby Great Circle planets. The crew travels to the planet, and discovers that most life on it has been destroyed by unsafe experimentation with radioactivity. On their return journey, the Tantra is scheduled to meet a carrier spacecraft to refuel, but the second ship does not make the rendezvous. The crew attempts the return voyage with meager fuel, but is trapped by the gravitational field of an "iron star" (some form of compact star in modern terms). The crew lands on one of its planets, where they discover the wreck of a previous expedition, as well as a mysterious alien spacecraft. After fighting off the native life-form, the crew retrieve the remaining fuel supplies from the wreck and succeed in returning to Earth.

The second major plot line follows Darr Veter, the director of the global space agency as he makes way for a successor and then attempt to find a new job for himself. When his successor voluntarily steps down as punishment for a daring experiment that goes wrong, Veter returns to the position. The book closes with the launch of a new expedition, once again led by Noor, to a pair of new planets that offer the possibility of human colonisation. It is a bittersweet ending, as the cosmonauts themselves will not live long enough to return.

== Literary significance and criticism ==
Critics have accused the heroes of the novel being more of philosophical ideas than live people. Nevertheless, the novel was a major milestone in Soviet science-fiction literature, which, in Stalin's era, had been much more short-sighted (never venturing more than a few decades into the future) and primarily focusing on technical inventions rather than social issues (the so-called "close-range science fiction"). Boris Strugatsky wrote:

Yefremov was an ice breaker of a man. He has broken the seemingly unbreakable ice of the "close range theory". He has shown how one can and should write modern SF, and thus has ushered a new era of Soviet SF. Of course those times were already different, the Stalin Ice Age was nearing its end, and I think that even without Andromeda, Soviet SF would soon start a new course. But the publication of Andromeda has become a symbol of the new era, its banner, in some sense. Without it, the new growth would have been an order of magnitude more difficult, and a thaw in our SF wouldn't have come until later.

The novel has been credited with popularizing science fiction in the Soviet bloc, as the Communist Party of the Soviet Union decided that this genre could be used to promote the idea of communism's inevitable victory in the future.

== Characters ==
=== Crew of the first class spaceship Tantra ===
(37th Space Expedition)

- Erg Noor, chief of the expedition, spaceship commander
- Nisa Creet, astronavigator
- Pour Hyss, astronomer
- Louma Lasvy, ship's physician
- Eon Thal, biologist
- Ingrid Dietra, astronomer
- Pel Lynn, astronavigator
- Beena Ledd, geologist
- Taron, mechanical engineer
- Ione Marr, teacher of gymnastics, dietary supervisor, storekeeper
- Kay Bear, electronic engineer

=== Characters of Earth ===
==== Men ====
- Grom Orme, President of the Astronautical Council
- Diss Ken, his son
- Zieg Zohr, music composer
- Thor Ann, son of Zieg Zohr, Diss Ken's friend
- Mir Ohm, Secretary of the Astronautical Council
- Darr Veter, retiring Director of the Outer Stations
- Mwen Mass, successor to Darr Veter
- Junius Antus, Director of the Electronic Memory Machines
- Kam Amat, Indian scientist (In a former age)
- Liao Lang, palaeontologist
- Renn Bose, physicist
- Cart Sann, painter
- Frith Don, Director of the Maritime Archaeological Expedition
- Sherliss, mechanic to the expedition
- Ahf Noot, prominent surgeon
- Grimm Schar, biologist of the Institute of Nerve Currents
- Zann Senn, poet, historian
- Heb Uhr, soil scientist
- Beth Lohn, mathematician, criminal in exile
- Embe Ong, candidate for Director of the Outer Stations
- Cadd Lite, engineer on Satellite 57

==== Women ====
- Evda Nahl, psychiatrist
- Rhea, her daughter
- Veda Kong, historian
- Miyiko Eigoro, historian, Veda's assistant
- Chara Nandi, biologist, dancer, artist's model
- Onar, girl of the Island of Oblivion
- Eva Djann, astronomer
- Liuda Pheer, psychologist (in a former age)

=== Extraterrestrial characters ===
- Goor Hahn, observer on the diurnal satellite
- Zaph Phthet, Director of External Relations of the planet of 61 Cygni

== Bibliography ==
1. Jameson, Fredric. "Progress Versus Utopia; or, Can We Imagine the Future?" Science Fiction Studies 9.2 (1982): 147–158.
2. Suvin, Darko. "Three World Paradigms for SF: Asimov, Yefremov, Lem." Pacific Quarterly (Moana): An International Review of Arts and Ideas 4.(1979): 271–283.
3. Yefremov, Ivan. Andromeda: A Space-Age Tale translated by George Hanna. Moscow: Foreign Language Publishing House, 1959, 444 pp. LCCN: 95207661.
4. Yefremov, Ivan. Andromeda: A Space-Age Tale translated by George Hanna. Moscow: Progress Publishers, 1980, 397 pp. ISBN 0-8285-1856-4. LCCN: 82206351.
5. Yefremov, Ivan. Andromeda: A Space-Age Tale. NL: Fredonia Books, August 30, 2004, 384 pp. ISBN 1-4101-0685-3.
