= Razor's Edge (novel) =

1963 novel by Ivan Yefremov

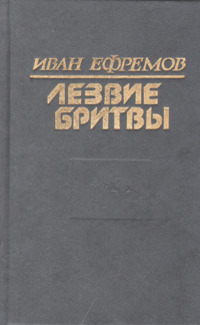
- Author: Ivan Yefremov
- Publication date: 1963
- Publication place: USSR

Razor's Edge (Russian: Лезвие бритвы, Lezvie britvy, Edge of the Razor) is a 1963 science fiction novel by the Soviet writer and paleontologist Ivan Yefremov. It includes four parts and is notable for a huge amount of the scientific facts and dynamism.

Efremov used the word "eidetica" as an ability to a deliberate dreams, when man dreams in full details about something that is known to him only as told by friends, read in books or seen in pictures. In this novel such capability to see such panoramic color images appears in one of the novel's characters after he is contused in the time of the Great Patriotic War. Later on he arrives in Moscow, USSR to ask the doctors explain this symptom. While healed he sees an even more detailed dream, but after he loses his unique ability.

== Plot ==
The plot contains some storylines which are intertwined. We can name these storylines according to their setting places. The first one is the Soviet Storyline and is about the medical doctor and psychophysiologist Ivan Girin, who studies the hidden possibilities of human brain and is interested in human beauty. The second storyline is about a group of Italians who go to Africa to find diamonds, but find Alexander the Great's Crown with mysterious crystals in it. The third storyline is about Dayaram Ramamoorty, the sculptor from India, and Amrita Tillottama, the dancer. The characters meet each other in the end of the novel.

== Characters ==
=== Ivan Girin ===
He is the main character in the soviet storyline and then, in the whole book, too. He is a medical doctor, who worked as a surgeon, but later dedicated himself to psychophysiology. Soviet scientist Alexey Bystrow is a prototype of his character and Italian actor Amedeo Nazzari is a prototype of his appearance.

=== Serafima Yuryevna (Sima) Metalina ===
She is a 28-year-old sportswoman (modern rhythmic gymnastics). She meets Girin at the exhibition where Anna's statue is present. Sima breaks a stereotype of sportswoman: instead of being ignorant, she is well-educated, fond of literature and arts and speaks English. Polish actress Barbara Kwiatkowska-Lass is a prototype of her appearance.

=== Dayaram Ramamoorty ===
Dayaram Ramamoorty is the main character in the Indian Storyline. He is a sculptor and is looking for a way to sculpt his idea of perfect beauty.

=== Tillottama ===
Tillottama is a second main character in the Indian storyline. The readers meet her with Dayaram in the Khajuraho Temple. She catches Dayaram's eye by her beauty, but after she is acquainted with him and proves to be very heartful and intellectual. Dayaram is curious about her life, and she tells him her life story.

Her real name is Amrita Vidiadevi.

=== Sandra Citti ===
Sandra Citti is from the Italian Storyline. She is Ivo Flaiano's girlfriend, young, beautiful and glamorous. She goes on the adventurous yacht trip with Cezare, Lea and Ivo. During the trip she reveals that she is not just a beautiful young actress, but also an ancient history specialist.

== Composition ==
The novel consists of prologue, four main parts and epilogue.
