= The Land of Foam =

1946 novel by Ivan Yefremov

- First English edition, 1957
- Author: Ivan Yefremov
- Language: Russian
- Genre: Adventure; Science fiction
- Publisher: Foreign Languages Publishing House (Moscow) - English
- Publication date: 1946
- Publication place: Soviet Union
- English publication date: 1957

The Land of Foam also known as At the Edge of Oikoumene (Russian: На краю Ойкумены, romanized: Na krayu Oikumeny) and Great Arc (Russian: Великая Дуга, romanized: Velikaya Duga) is a novel written by Soviet writer Ivan Yefremov in 1946. It was translated to English by George Hanna in 1957.

== Plot summary ==
The novel is divided in two parts, separated by more than 1000 years.

The first part takes place during the rule of the pharaoh Djedefra (26th century BC), who decides to send an expedition to the South, in order to seek the famous and fabled Land of Punt and to seek the limits of the land and the start of the Great Arc, the circular ocean encompassing the entire world in Egyptian cosmology.

The second part starts in Ancient Greece during its Aegean Period (no precise dates are provided, but one can assume a date c. 1000–900 BC). A young sculptor named Pandion sets off on a journey to Crete, but he ends up on Phoenician Trading Ship ( while trying to escape captivity from some local wild Crete people), and after 4 days, he jumps the ship in the middle of the storm ( while escaping sacrifice from frightened sailors), and a storm finally lands him in Egypt, where he is enslaved. He manages to win his freedom and find friends and after a long and perilous journey through African savanna and jungle comes back home. On the way, he carves a cameo which portrays his friends and some details of their adventures.

In a short framing narrative, modern researchers examine the cameo and contemplate its possible origins.
