= Eden (Lem novel) =

1958 novel by Stanisław Lem

- First edition (Polish)
- Author: Stanisław Lem
- Translator: Marc E. Heine
- Cover artist: Maciej Hibner
- Language: Polish
- Genre: Social science fiction
- Publisher: Iskry
- Publication date: 1959
- Publication place: Poland
- English publication date: 1989
- Media type: Print
- Pages: 276
- ISBN: 0-15-627806-5
- OCLC: 19324099
- LC Class: PG7158.L39 E313 1989

Eden is a 1958 social science fiction novel by Polish writer Stanisław Lem. It was first published in 1958 in issues 211-271 of the newspaper Trybuna Robotnicza. The first book edition was in 1959. It was first published in English in 1989 (ISBN 0-15-127580-7).

== Plot ==
A starship crew—Captain (in the original, Coordinator), Doctor, Engineer, Chemist, Physicist and Cyberneticist (robotics expert)—crash land on an alien world they call Eden. After escaping their wrecked ship they set out to explore the planet, first traveling through an unsettling wilderness and coming upon an abandoned automated factory. There they find a constant cycle of materials being produced and then destroyed and recycled. Perplexed, they return to their ship. At the crash site they find a local sentient alien has entered their vessel. They name these large creatures, with small torsos retractable into their large bodies, doublers (a translation of Lem's neologism dubelt, to mean "double-bodied").

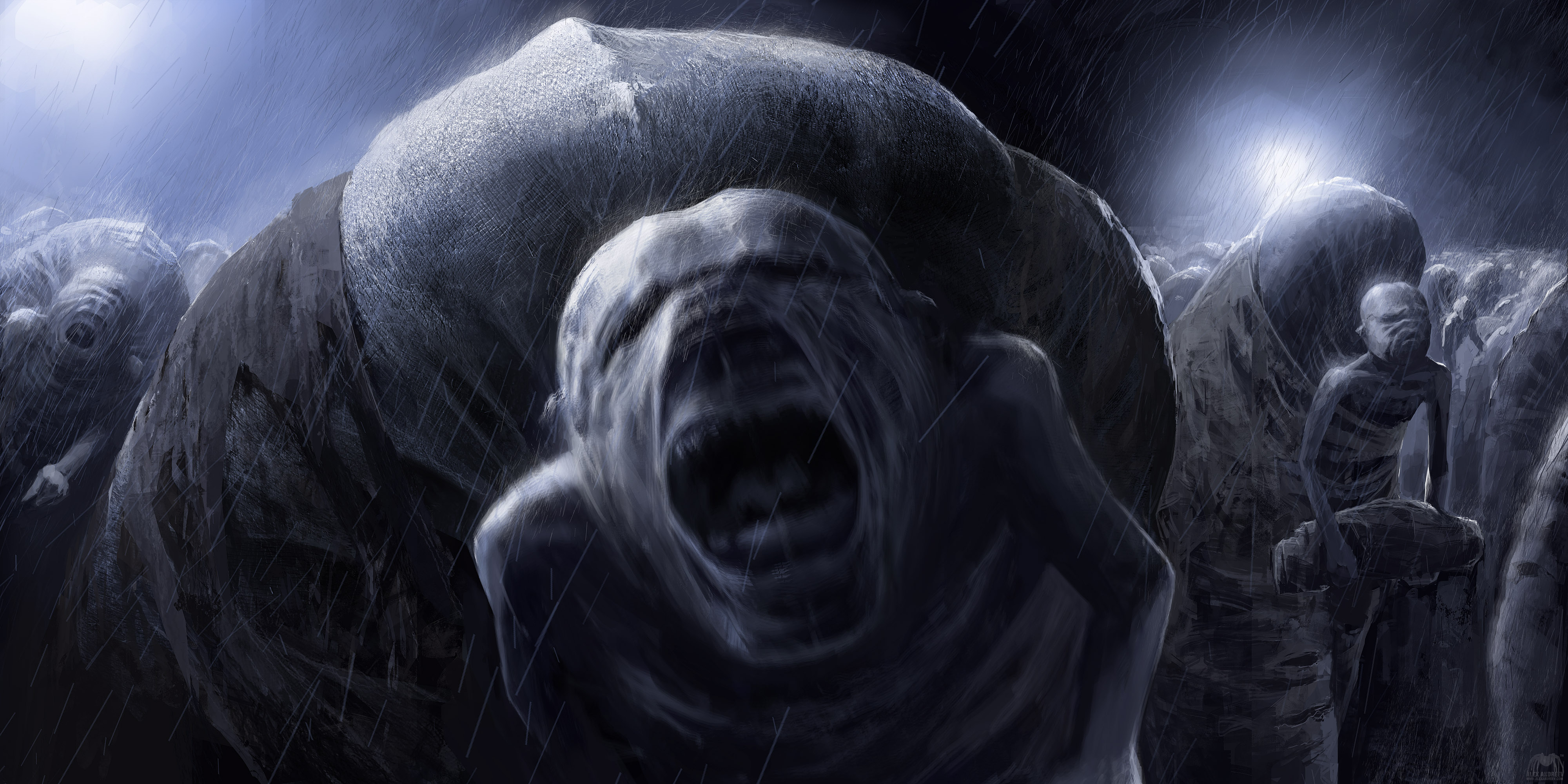
Doublers, as envisioned by Alex Andreev

The next day the expedition begins to come into contact with the local civilization, and their strange, wheel-like vehicles. Eventually they come into conflict with a vehicle's pilot, who is a doubler. Killing the pilot and fleeing in his vehicle, they return to the ship and prepare defenses. After an attack never comes, they assemble their jeep and half the team sets out to explore further, the other half remaining behind to repair the ship.

The jeep team eventually discovers structures resembling graves and hundreds of preserved skeletons, and adjacent to it, a settlement. Two expedition members exploring the settlement become caught in a stampede of doublers, who seem totally indifferent to the presence of the alien expedition. One doubler however, comes to the jeep and refuses to return to the settlement, and is brought back to the ship. While the expedition explored the settlement, a large group of doubler vehicles had reconnoitered the crash site and then fled.

After a while the crew learns that the local civilization is planning to act against them. Shortly thereafter the area around the ship is bombarded for several hours, with all hits falling into a circular ditch made earlier. It turns out they were bombarded with "micromechanical devices", from which a wall of glass begins to grow and eventually assembles into a dome, an attempt to isolate the ship.

The doubler that has joined the group proves to be uncommunicative, leading some of the crew to suggest that it has some sort of intellectual disability. The crew also begins to postulate that the "naked" doublers they have seen are the victims of genocide. Choosing to explore further, the crew activates "Defender", a large tank which they have managed to repair. Blasting through the glass dome they travel far southwest, observing from a distance, for the first time, everyday doubler life.

Returning to the ship in the night, the crew encounters a group of doublers being gassed to death, and act in self defense with their antimatter weapons, killing an indeterminate number of both "naked" and "soldier" doublers. When the Defender team returns to the ship, they find that most of the glass wall has repaired itself, and blast another hole. Returning to the ship until the radioactivity dies down, the expedition plans its next move. In the middle of the meeting a dressed doubler suddenly enters, and the crew makes contact, discovering the doubler to have knowledge of astronomy.

The first contact however, is soon turned into a bitter victory, as the crew learns that this doubler has unwittingly exposed himself to radiation by entering the hole made by Defender. Informing the doubler of his impending death, both parties struggle to learn as much as they can. Through a developed computer translator, the crew and the doubler can speak to one another and begin to gain an understanding of the other's species.

An indistinct image emerges of doublers' Orwellian information-controlled civilization that is almost self-regulating, with a special kind of system of government—one that officially does not exist and is thus impossible to destroy. The society is controlled through a fictitious advanced branch of information science Lem dubs procrustics, based on the control and stratification of information flows within the society. It is used for molding groups within a society and ultimately a society as a whole to behave as designed by secret hidden rulers. One example described in the novel is the above-mentioned settlement, kind of a "concentration camp" without any guards, designed so that the prisoners stay inside apparently of their own "free" will.

Although the doublers know almost nothing of nuclear science, they once conducted a massive genetic experiment to enhance the species. This attempt failed miserably, resulting in deformed doublers who, if they survive, are often driven to the fringes of society. Much like the government, the very existence of this experiment, and the factories created for it, are denied, and anyone with the knowledge of them is eliminated. The doubler explains that the information disseminated to the higher echelons of doubler society was that humans, having been subjected to the effects of cosmic rays throughout their space journey, were mutant monsters that were being quarantined, but he had seen it as a once-in-a-lifetime opportunity and chose to pursue it, a choice the humans greatly empathize with.

Finally the ship is repaired and the crew is ready to leave Eden. The astronomer doubler, although recovering fully from his radiation exposure, decides to stay behind, and as the starship takes off, much to the crew's sadness, the two doublers stand by the ship's exhaust, choosing to die rather than return to their oppressive society.

The planet is seen from the distance once again. Because of its beauty, they had crashed into the first place and called it Eden.

== Literary criticism ==
Lem's own opinion about the book was unflattering. He wrote "From today's perspective Eden is neutral in my eyes. It is so-so. From the point of view of literature it is a rather unsuccessful book; its characters tend to be schematic and the pictured universe is a bit "flat" and one-dimensional."

Marek Oramus in his essay Doktryna nieingerencji ("Doctrine of Noninterfence") writes that the novel marks the beginning of the full maturity of Lem as a writer. He also notes that, although the technology in the novel overall is rather archaic from today's point of view, the novel describes something that is called nanotechnology today. He also remarks that Eden is the first of Lem's stories about failed "first contact". Lem's later writings of this type are much more skeptical, the best known case being Solaris.

== Background ==
The book was written in the Polish People's Republic while under a Soviet-style regime, which in all Eastern Bloc countries had a system of all-pervasive censorship and information control and stratification.

== See also ==
- Double bind
- Some other novels in which information manipulation is a major part of the plot
  - The Bull's Hour (planet-wide totalitarian state through information control and stratification)
  - Prisoners of Power (anonymous totalitarian oligarchy through propaganda and mind control)
  - The Lucifer Principle (society as memes carrier, shaped by them in return)
  - Nineteen Eighty-Four
  - Brave New World (hedonistic caste-based society with everyone conditioned to be non-curious, content with their place; full information available to a select few "World Controllers")

== Sources ==
- Harvest Books; Reprint edition. (1991) ISBN 0-15-627806-5
