= The Bull's Hour =

1968 novel by Ivan Yefremov

The Hour of the Bull
- First edition cover
- Author: Ivan Yefremov
- Original title: Час Быка
- Illustrator: Galina Boyko and Igor Shalito
- Language: Russian
- Genre: Social science fiction
- Published: 1970
- Publisher: Molodaya Gvardiya
- Publication place: Soviet Union
- Media type: Print (Hardcover)
- Preceded by: "The Heart of the Serpent"

The Hour of the Bull (Russian: Час Быка, Chas Byká) is a social science fiction novel written by Soviet author and paleontologist Ivan Yefremov in 1968. Six months after its publication in book form in 1970 Soviet authorities attempted to remove it from libraries and bookshops after realizing that it contained a sharp criticism of the current state of affairs in the USSR disguised as a critique of "Capitalism" and Chinese-style communism of that time. It was published again in the 1980s "perestrojka" and thereafter.

This novel is considered a sequel to the 1957 novel Andromeda, taking place in the same universe some century or more later. Even though the cast of characters is entirely different, an occasional reference is made to the events and characters of the previous volume. For example, the main character in The Hour of the Bull is a female historian who on one occasion remembers most of the notable Andromeda characters as historical figures.

== Plot summary ==
The plot is of the "story within a story" format. The actual story is told as an answer to a question asked in school at a lesson about the patterns of the development of societies. The story goes as follows.

Some 3000 years in the future, a Communist Earth has just developed faster-than-light space travel based on the experiment of Ren Boz (from the Andromeda novel). Using the new technology, Earth constructs "straight-beam" starships which travel by sliding on the edge between our Universe ("Shakti") and the Anti-Universe ("Tamas"). The second ship of that kind, Dark Flame, departs from the Solar System on a mission to a habitable planet Tormance (named after the planet in A Voyage to Arcturus by David Lindsay—whom Yefremov erroneously refers to as Arthur Lindsay) in the Lynx constellation, which was reported by alien space voyagers from Cepheus to be colonized by humans, thought to be Earth escapees from the Age before World Unification.

The society of this distant planet is labelled by Efremov as "an amalgamation of a Capitalism in its worst form and of a Chinese pseudo-socialism" and a part of "Inferno" (a deep philosophical concept of Efremov's relating to the Nature and the natural way of things, always as he claims infernal towards the living thinking sentient beings), a society in which ordinary workers' lives are limited to 26 local years ("short-living", KJI, or КЖИ for Russian: "КороткоЖИвущие") while scientists, engineers and other selected qualified professionals live out their natural lives ("long-living", DJI, or ДЖИ for Russian: "ДолгоЖИвущие"), with artists, sportspeople and "models" given somewhat longer life-spans than that of KJI (up to about 34 years). Both KJI and DJI are under the ruthless totalitarian control of the ruling class of government bureaucracy ("snake-carriers", similar to the prototypical "inner-party members" of Orwell's 1984) and the police forces ("the lilac"), which in turn are under the direct command of the Council of Four and its Chairman, the actual Ruler of the planet. The most shocking aspect of its civilization for the Earthlings is its total control of information, maintaining separate information systems for separate social strata, with full and true information available ultimately only to the Supreme Leader (who, for example, is the only one on the whole planet knowing that Tormance people are, in fact, from Earth).

The plot follows the Communist crew as they establish contact and explore the planet's society, eventually sacrificing some lives including that of the expedition leader, female historian Fay Rodis, for the sake of free future of the planet and its people. Their influence is predominantly through providing full and true information freely to all people about Earth's past and present, and their views of the situation on the planet. They also provide a selective short memory-eraser to be used against the system's spies by the nascent resistance. Also, some of the crew (esp. Rodis) have the mental capacity to do the same sort of influence without use of the device. Every member of the crew was also accompanied by a nine-legged discoid robot called SDF (Servant, Defender and Freighter).

As the Earth spaceship prepares to depart home, the astronavigator Vir Norin volunteers to stay and help the resistance fighters.

After the story of Tormance has been told in the classroom it was clarified by the teacher that the contact with the Earth people had eventually indeed helped the people of Tormance to achieve Freedom. Now, some 130 years after the events, the Earth had just received a message from the Tormancians, and a starship from one of Earth colonies was being prepared to be sent to Tormance.

== Main concepts ==
- Inferno, the Nature and Nature's way of death and suffering at the basis of life and development (evolution etc.). Main measure of societal infernality is how much efforts are the individuals forced to spend "for nothing", without contributing to their well-being. The main achievement of Humanity in the novel is that it overcame the Inferno through arduous journey finally achieving "free and rational life for everyone".
- Ahriman's arrow, the apparent selection and forces in the infernal societies directed against their best and brightest and most good-willing.
- Communist moneyless Earth society, self-organizing through interactions of free highly morally developed responsible individuals, with collective child-rearing, direct planet-wide voting and discussions on every issue, and High Councils coordinating people's efforts each in its area of expertise.
- Protective societal systems, targeted at preventing the lowly infernal parts of human psyche to resurface and break the finely tuned societal order of Communist Earth (e.g. counteracting aggressive tendencies in advance, that would otherwise necessitate counter-force in self-defense, if allowed to develop into actions).
- The Great Ring of Civilizations communicating with each other by sending radio signals through space each to its closest neighbor, enduring the delays as determined by the laws of physics, exchanging ideas and information about each other's culture, history and values. The sending of the signal is described as taking an enormous amount of energy, on planetary scale, in order to reach even the closest neighboring civilization in the Ring.
- The cardinal law of the Great Ring whereas any interference in a state's internal affairs is forbidden unless that civilization is impeding free access to the full, unaltered, non-filtered and non-distorted information for all and any of its subjects – in which case such a state is said to have no right to exist and the interference by the Great Ring is demanded to free its people and ensure their Right to Know and Right to Think:
  "Not one state has such a right [to deny access to information], not one planet! The sacred duty of each of us is to contravene such an unprecedented oppression. Who dares block the way of a sentient reasoning being towards knowledge? ... When in the Great Ring a state is discovered that blocks the way to knowledge for its people, such a state is dismantled. This is the only case that gives the right to interfere in the affairs of another planet. ... the prohibition to learn about arts, sciences, life on other planets, is unacceptable."

=== Eras of human history ===
Spanning approximately three thousand years from the 20th century to the present time of the novel, these are:

- The Era of Disjoint World
- The Era of World Reunion (people of the world uniting together, creating the new society)
- The Era of Common Labor (the period of cleaning, improving and beautifying the Earth)
- The Era of the Great Ring (started with the discovery of the Great Ring)
- The Era of Meeting Hands (started with the discovery of faster-than-light communications and travel)

It is hinted that a devastating world war has occurred between the eras of Disjoint World and World Reunion, nearly wiping out the Humanity. And prior to it there was a period of great ecological degradation and pollution resulting in widespread diseases, genetic and otherwise, increase in cancer rates and planet-wide epidemics (that's when the progenitors of Tormancian human population had left the "doomed" Earth on a starship flotilla that subsequently "fell through a space-time anomaly", and found itself near the inhabitable planet of Tormance, by pure chance).

== Main characters ==
=== Starship Dark Flame crew ===
- Fay Rodis, expedition commander, historian
- Grif Rift, annihilation drive engineer, starship commander
- Vir Norin, astronavigator-I
- Menta Cor, astronavigator-II
- Div Simbel, pilot-engineer
- Gan Atal, armour belt defence engineer
- Nei Holly, biological defence engineer
- Sol Sain, computational devices engineer
- Olla Dez, communication and photography officer
- Evisa Tanet, medical officer, StarFleet Doctor
- Tivisa Henako, biologist
- Chedi Daan, sociologist, linguist
- Tor Lik, astrophysicist, planetologist

=== Planet Tormance characters ===
- Choyo Chagas, Chairman of the Big Four, the ruler of the Planet
- Gen Shi, Zet Ug, Ka Loof, his deputies, other members of the Big Four
- Yantreh Yahhahh, his wife
- Er Vo-Bia, his girlfriend
- Honte'ello Tollo Fraelle (or Taele), his communications officer
- Yan Gao-Yuar (Yangar), commander of "the lilac"
- Su An-Te (Su-Te), Tormance girl
- Kzer Boo-Yam, "leader of the KJI" ("the short-living")

== Publications and translations ==
The novel was first published in 1968 in the Soviet popular science magazine Tekhnika Molodezhi (Technology for the Youth). The second publication was in 1969, in magazine Molodaya Gvardiya (Young Guard).

Book editions:

- 1970, publisher "Molodaya Gvardiya", 200000 copies
- 1988, publisher "MPI", 135000 copies

After breakup of the USSR, there were more publications of the book.

The novel was translated to Hungarian (1972), Czech (1973), French (1979), Bulgarian (1984), Ukrainian (1990, 1991), and Polish (2015) languages An English translation became available in 2024 as an open access e-book produced by Russian View Team.

== See also ==
- Eden, a novel by Stanislaw Lem.
- The Lucifer Principle, a book by Howard Bloom.
