= Cutty Sark (short story) =

1944 work by Ivan Yefremov

- Short story by Ivan Yefremov
- Original title: Russian: ""Катти Сарк""
- Country: Soviet Union
- Language: Russian
- Genre(s): Novella

Publication
- Published in: Krasnoflotets (Leningrad), 1944, №5
- Media type: Print (magazine)
- Publication date: 1944

Chronology
| — | revised version of 1958 |

"Cutty Sark" (Russian: Катти Сарк) is a novella about the sailing ship Cutty Sark by the Soviet writer and paleontologist Ivan Yefremov. It was written in 1942–1943 and first published in the USSR in 1944.

Intrigued by the history of the Cutty Sark, Yefremov produced a sketch about her, which ended with a beautiful version of dry-docking the legendary tea clipper in the United States. The story was translated into English and other languages. Yefremov's story may have influenced the preservation of the Cutty Sark, which was reconstructed and dry-docked by the Cutty Sark Preservation Society in Greenwich, London, 1954. The Cutty Sark Preservation Society was formed 2 years prior to the reconstruction of the Cutty Sark in 1952.

The feedback from English-speaking readers forced Yefremov to "upgrade" the storyline with some new facts from clipper's life.

The story popularized the Cutty Sark in the USSR and Russia.
