= Thais of Athens =

1972 novel by Ivan Yefremov

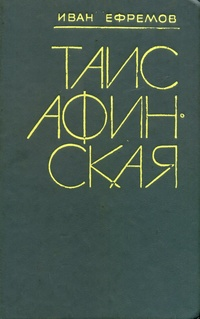
- Author: Ivan Yefremov
- Language: Russian
- Genre: Historical novel
- Publication date: 1973
- Publication place: USSR

Thais of Athens (Russian: Таис Афинская) is a historical novel by Ivan Efremov written in 1972. It tells the story of the famous hetaera Thaïs, who was one of Alexander the Great's contemporaries and companions on his conquest of the oikoumene or the known world. The book combines the life of the historical and a fictional Tais.

== Background ==
Yefremov was a historian and paleontologist who took a deep interest in Ancient Greece. The earliest roots of the novel can be found in his 1946 tale Callirhoe (Russian: Каллироя), where the meeting between Callirhoe and Antenor is reworked into the meeting between Thaïs and Ptolemy. Plans for writing a novel based on the life of Thaïs were found in Yefremov's notes as early as 1951. The works of Plutarch and Diodor had a great influence on the novel.

The novel was first published in a censored form in the Molodaya Gvardiya magazine in 1972. It was republished without censorship in the late 1980s and was then published again in 1992.

== Summary ==
It follows such actual events as the burning of Persepolis by Tais and her becoming Ptolemy's Egyptian queen, but also speculates on a love affair with Alexander and Tais's initiation in some of the obscure religions of the ancient world. In the novel, the very young (only 17 years old) and already famous Athenian hetaera Tais meets the exiled heir to the Macedonian throne and his childhood friends Hephaestion, Nearchus and Ptolemy. She then travels to Sparta and Crete with the Macedonians, visits Egypt and Mesopotamia, where she becomes an initiate in the temple of Ashtoreth (Astarte) and eventually follows Alexander to Persepolis, which she requests be set on fire. After Alexander's death, Tais marries Ptolemy and becomes the queen of Memphis.
