= Road of Winds =

Book by Ivan Yefremov

Road of Winds, Russian edition, 1956

The Road of Winds (a.k.a. Gobi Notes) is a non-fiction book by Ivan Yefremov about his three years' travel in Mongolia (1946–1949) when he was the head of the Joint Soviet-Mongolian Paleontology Expedition.

Most findings described in the book went to Orlov Museum .
