= The Heart of the Serpent =

1958 short story by Ivan Yefremov

- Cover of the 2002 Fredonia Books edition
- Author: Ivan Yefremov
- Original title: Cor Serpentis; Сердце Змеи
- Translator: Roza Prokofieva
- Language: Russian
- Series: The Great Circle
- Genre: Science fiction
- Publisher: Foreign Languages (1st edition); Collier Books (1st U.S. edition)
- Publication date: 1958
- Publication place: Soviet Union
- English publication date: 1961 in USSR; 1962 in USA
- Media type: Print (Paperback)
- ISBN: 1-4101-0041-3
- Preceded by: Andromeda
- Followed by: The Bull's Hour

"The Heart of the Serpent" (originally in Latin: Cor Serpentis, Russian: Сердце Змеи) is a 1958 science fiction short story by the Soviet writer and paleontologist Ivan Yefremov.

The crew of a spaceship encounters an alien ship in deep space. Speculation ensues about whether the other crew might be hostile. Comparisons are made to American SF writer Murray Leinster's story "First Contact", in which an elaborate protocol is developed to prevent the aliens from following the Terrans home and destroying them, or vice versa. The premise of Leinster's story is rejected, in part by pointing out that in order for a planet's civilization to become space-faring, they would need to be at peace among themselves and presumably have organized themselves into a planet-wide classless communist society, a point Yefremov had made earlier in his novel Andromeda. Thus the aliens must necessarily be peaceful.

This story takes place within the rubric of Yefremov's Great Circle, a confederation of galactic civilizations that communicate between each other, which also appears in the Andromeda novel.

== Influences ==
The Hungarian space rock band Solaris has a track named after the story on their album 1990.

== Bibliography ==
- The Heart of the Serpent compilation of the Soviet SF translated by Roza Prokofieva. Moscow: Foreign Languages Publishing House, 1961, 267 pp.
- More Soviet Science Fiction. New York: Collier Books, 1962, 190 pp. OCLC 297464
- The Heart of the Serpent. NL: Fredonia Books, 4 September 2002, 272 pp. ISBN 1-4101-0041-3.
- A kígyó szíve (transl. Imre Makai), in: Galaktika, 2: 73-109. Budapest: Móra, 1972.
