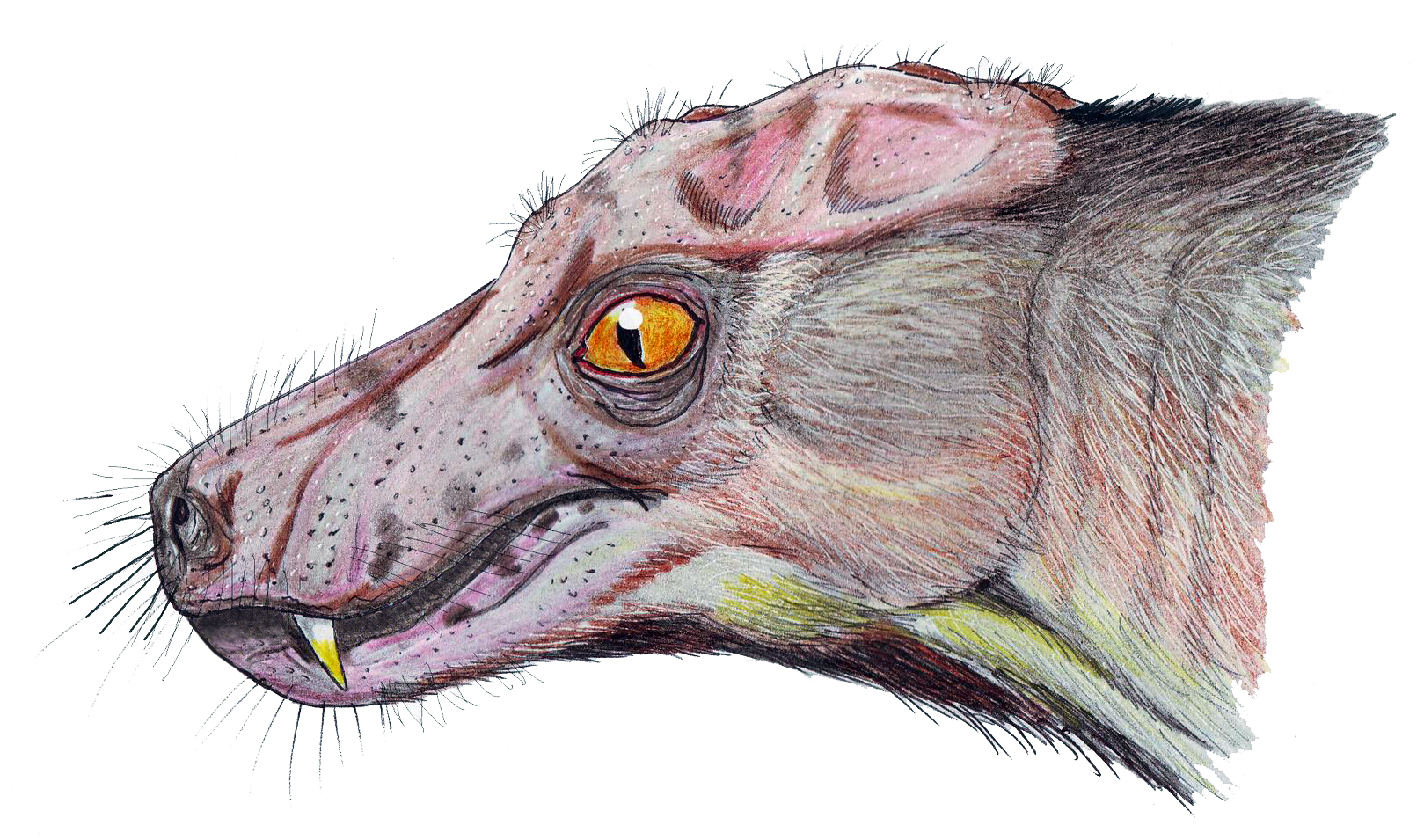

Scientific classification
- Domain: Eukaryota
- Kingdom: Animalia
- Phylum: Chordata
- Clade: Synapsida
- Clade: Therapsida
- Clade: †Therocephalia
- Genus: †Porosteognathus

= Porosteognathus =

Extinct genus of therapsids from Russia

Porosteognathus is an extinct genus of therocephalian therapsids. Remains have been found at Isheevo in Russia (Republic of Tatarstan). It is known from the Middle Permian.
