= Stellar Ships =

1944 short story by Ivan Yefremov

- Russian edition, 2003
- Author: Ivan Yefremov
- Original title: Russian: Звёздные корабли
- Language: Russian
- Genre: Science fiction
- Publication place: Soviet Union
- Media type: Print (Paperback)

"Stellar Ships" or "Star Ships" (Russian name "Zvezdnye Korabli", Russian: Звёздные корабли) is a short story by the Soviet writer and paleontologist Ivan Yefremov written in 1944 and first published in 1948 in the USSR.

This story is about the discovery of an ancient dinosaur bone with a mysterious bullet hole (or "blaster hole") and an alien skull and his portrait nearby. This acts as a starting point and a cover story to the philosophical idea of plurality of the mind cradles in the Universe, similarity of planet evolution paths, and similarity of physiology and psychology. Yefremov states the final perspective for all civilisations is The Great Circle, which will unite them all.
