= Ivanantonia =

Ivanantonia Temporal range: early Eocene

Scientific classification
- Kingdom: Animalia
- Phylum: Chordata
- Class: Mammalia
- Infraclass: Placentalia
- Order: Rodentia
- Family: incertae sedis
- Genus: †Ivanantonia; Shevyreva, 1989
- Species: †I. efremovi

Binomial name
- †Ivanantonia efremovi Shevyreva, 1989

Extinct genus of rodents

Ivanantonia is the only genus in the extinct rodent family Ivanantoniidae and is represented by a single species, Ivanantonia efremovi, from the early Eocene of Mongolia. Ivanantonia is poorly known, with only the lower dentition represented. The genus is unusual among early rodents in lacking all lower premolars and in showing evidence of propalinal chewing. The relationships of Ivanantonia are unclear. It was described as a ctenodactyloid. Hartenberger et al. suggested a potential relationship to the muroid Nonomys but declined to assign Ivanantoniidae to a suborder within Rodentia.
