= James Hopson =

American paleontologist

James Allen Hopson (born 1935) is an American paleontologist and professor (now retired) at the University of Chicago. His work has focused on the evolution of the synapsids (a group of amniotes that includes the mammals), and has been focused on the transition from basal synapsids to mammals, from the late Paleozoic through the Mesozoic Eras. He received his doctorate at Chicago in 1965, and worked at Yale before returning to Chicago in 1967 as a faculty member in Anatomy, and has also been a research associate at the Field Museum of Natural History since 1971. He has also worked on the paleobiology of dinosaurs, and his work, along with that of Peter Dodson, has become a foundation piece for the modern understanding of duckbill crests, social behavior, and variation. He received the Quantrell Award.

== Selected publications ==
- Clark, J.M.; Hopson, J.A. (1985). "Distinctive mammal-like reptile from Mexico and its bearing on the phylogeny of the Tritylodontidae". Nature. 315 (6018): 398–400. doi:10.1038/315398a0. S2CID 4280605.
- Hopson, J.A. & H.R. Barghusen. 1986. An analysis of therapsid relationships. In: The Ecology and Biology of Mammal-like Reptiles (Ed. by N. Hotton III, P. D. MacLean, J. J. Roth, & E. C. Roth), pp. 83–106. Washington DC: Smithsonian Institution Press.
- Hopson, J.A. 1991. Systematics of the non-mammalian Synapsida and implications for patterns of evolution in synapsids. In: Controversial Views on the Origin of Higher Categories of Vertebrates (Ed. by H. P. Schultze & L. Trueb), Ithaca: Cornell University Press.
- Allin, E.F. & J.A. Hopson. 1991. Evolution of the auditory system in Synapsida ("mammal-like reptiles" and primitive mammals) as seen in the fossil record. In: The Evolutionary Biology of Hearing (Ed. by D. B. Webster, A. Popper, and R. Fay), New York: Springer-Verlag.
- Wible, J. R. & J. A. Hopson. 1993. Basicranial evidence for early mammal phylogeny. In: Mammal Phylogeny (Ed. by F. S. Szalay, M. J. Novacek, & M. C. McKenna), New York: Springer-Verlag.
- Hopson, J. A.; Rougier, G. W. (1993). "Braincase structure in the oldest known skull of a therian mammal: Implications for mammalian systematics and cranial evolution". American Journal of Science. 293: 268–299. doi:10.2475/ajs.293.a.268.
- Hopson, J.A. (1995). "Patterns of evolution in the manus and peers of non-mammalian therapsids". Journal of Vertebrate Paleontology. 15 (3): 615–639. doi:10.1080/02724634.1995.10011252.

== Bibliography ==
- A. W. Crompton, Farish A. Jenkins Jr., Susan Hopson, Timothy J. Gaudin, and Matthew T. Carrano, "James Allen Hopson: A Biography", pages 507–515 in Amniote Paleobiology: Perspectives on the Evolution of Mammals, Birds, and Reptiles: A volume honoring James Allen Hopson, edited by Matthew T. Carrano, Timothy J. Gaudin, Richard W. Blob, and John R. Wible. The University of Chicago Press, Chicago & London, 2006 ISBN 0-226-09477-4
