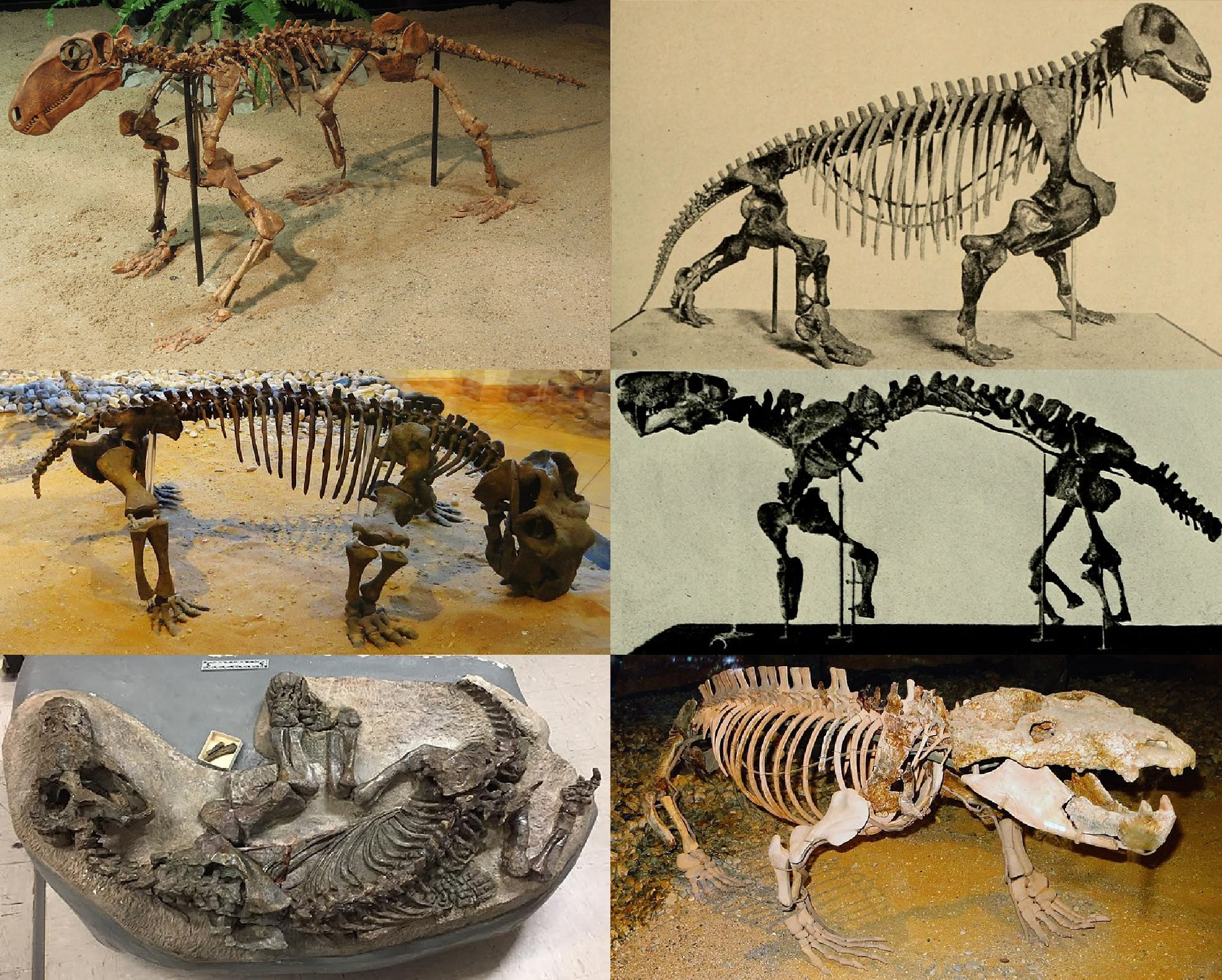
- From top to bottom and left to right, several examples of non-mammalian therapsids: Biarmosuchus (Biarmosuchia), Moschops (Dinocephalia), Lystrosaurus (Anomodontia), Inostrancevia (Gorgonopsia), a lycosuchid (Therocephalia) and Chiniquodon (Cynodontia)

Scientific classification
- Kingdom: Animalia
- Phylum: Chordata
- Clade: Synapsida
- Clade: Sphenacodontia
- Clade: Pantherapsida
- Clade: Sphenacodontoidea
- Clade: Therapsida; Broom, 1905

Clades
- †Raranimus; †Biarmosuchia; †Dinocephalia; †Anomodontia; Various extinct taxa; †Dicynodontia; Theriodontia; †Gorgonopsia; Eutheriodontia; †Therocephalia; Cynodontia; Various extinct taxa; Mammalia

= Therapsida =

Therapsida Temporal range: Middle Permian – Present, 275–0 Ma (Range includes Mammalia) (Possible latest Early Permian record)

Clade of tetrapods including mammals

Therapsida (Note: Greek: 'beast-arch') is a major group of eupelycosaurian synapsids. It includes mammals, as well as their ancestors and close relatives. Many defining traits of modern mammals had their origins within early therapsids. Changes in skeletal structure brought their limbs underneath their body mass which resulted in a more "standing" quadrupedal posture, as opposed to the lower sprawling posture of many reptiles and amphibians. The teeth of therapsids are differentiated into incisors, canines, and postcanines (the latter becoming differentiated into premolars and molars in mammals). Their necks also gained more flexibility allowing therapsids greater range of motion in moving their heads.

Therapsids split from their closest relatives within the "pelycosaurs", the carnivorous Sphenacodontidae (including the famous Dimetrodon) during the Late Carboniferous or earliest Permian. Their early evolutionary history during the Cisuralian (Early Permian), is obscure, and they lack confirmed fossil records during this time period leaving a substantial ghost lineage. They replaced the pelycosaurs as the dominant large land animals in the Guadalupian (Middle Permian) through to the Early Triassic. In the aftermath of the Permian–Triassic extinction event, therapsids declined in relative importance to the rapidly diversifying archosaurian sauropsids (pseudosuchians, dinosaurs and pterosaurs, etc.) during the Middle Triassic.

The therapsids include the cynodonts, the group that gave rise to mammals (Mammaliaformes) in the Late Triassic around 225 million years ago, the only therapsid clade that survived beyond the end of the Triassic. The only other group of therapsids to have survived into the Late Triassic, the dicynodonts, became extinct towards the end of the period. The last surviving group of non-mammaliaform cynodonts were the Tritylodontidae, which became extinct during the Early Cretaceous.

== Characteristics ==
=== Jaw and teeth ===
Skull of Syodon, a dinocephalian therapsid

The teeth of therapsids are ancestrally differentiated into incisor, canine and postcanine teeth. All therapsids other than Raranimus possess only one pair of canines in the upper jaw. Increasingly complex tooth cusps evolved in the cynodont ancestors of mammals.

=== Posture ===
Reconstruction of the skeleton of Moschorhinus kitchingi (Therocephalia)

Therapsid legs were positioned more vertically beneath their bodies than were the sprawling legs of reptiles and pelycosaurs. Also compared to these groups, the feet were more symmetrical, with the first and last toes short and the middle toes long, an indication that the foot's axis was placed parallel to that of the animal, not sprawling out sideways. This orientation would have given a more mammal-like gait than the lizard-like gait of the pelycosaurs.

=== Physiology ===
The physiology of non-mammalian therapsids is poorly understood. Most Permian therapsids had an open pineal foramen (opening) at the top of the skull, indicating that they had a parietal eye like many modern reptiles and amphibians. The parietal eye serves an important role in thermoregulation and the circadian rhythm of ectotherms, but is absent in modern mammals, which are endothermic. Near the end of the Permian, dicynodonts, therocephalians and cynodonts show parallel trends towards loss of the pineal foramen, and the foramen is completely absent in probainognathian cynodonts. Evidence from oxygen isotopes, which are correlated with body temperature, suggests that most Permian therapsids were ectotherms and that endothermy evolved convergently in dicynodonts and cynodonts near the end of the Permian. In contrast, evidence from histology suggests that endothermy is shared across Therapsida, whereas estimates of blood flow rate and lifespan in the mammaliaform Morganucodon suggest that even early mammaliaforms had reptile-like metabolic rates. Evidence for respiratory turbinates, which have been hypothesized to be indicative of endothermy, was reported in the therocephalian Glanosuchus, but subsequent study showed that the apparent attachment sites for turbinates may simply be the result of distortion of the skull. A 2022 study argued that endothermy first evolved in the probainognathian cynodont subgroup Mammaliamorpha based on the shape of the inner ear canals, which the authors suggested to vary in shape depending on the viscosity of the endolymph fluid, in turn dependent on body temperature.

=== Integument ===
Mummified foot of the dicynodont Lystrosaurus from the Karoo of South Africa, showing warty skin texture

The evolution of integument in therapsids is poorly known, and there are few fossils that provide direct evidence for the presence or absence of fur. The most basal synapsids with unambiguous direct evidence of fur are docodonts, which are mammaliaforms very closely related to crown-group mammals. Two "mummified" juvenile specimens of the dicynodont Lystrosaurus murrayi preserve skin impressions; the skin is hairless, leathery, and dimpled, somewhat comparable to elephant skin. Fossilized facial skin from the dinocephalian Estemmenosuchus has been described as showing that the skin was glandular and lacked both scales and hair.

Coprolites containing what appear to be hairs have been found from the Late Permian, though the nature of these structures is ambiguous.

The closure of the pineal foramen in probainognathian cynodonts may indicate a mutation in the regulatory gene Msx2, which is involved in both the closure of the skull roof and the maintenance of hair follicles in mice. This suggests that hair may have first evolved in probainognathians, though it does not entirely rule out an earlier origin of fur.

Whiskers probably evolved in probainognathian cynodonts, specifically those of the subgroup Prozostrodontia, based on the morphology of the infraorbital canal for the infraorbital nerve in the premaxilla and maxilla. Some studies had inferred an earlier origin for whiskers based on the presence of foramina on the snout of therocephalians and early cynodonts, but the arrangement of foramina in these taxa actually closely resembles lizards, which would make the presence of mammal-like whiskers unlikely.

=== Reproduction ===
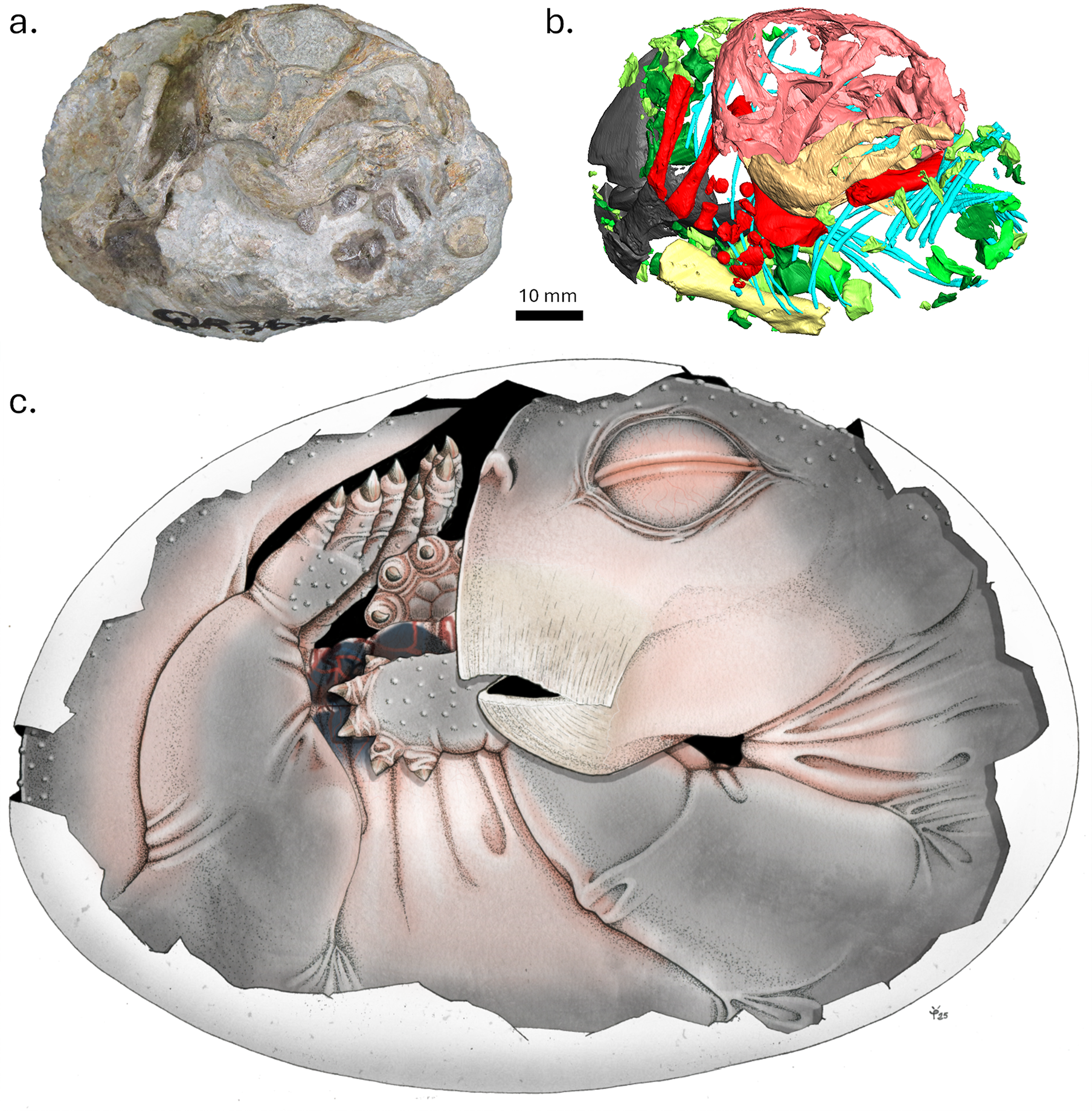
Preserved embryo of dicynodont therapsid Lystrosaurus from the Early Triassic of South Africa, with life restoration showing embryo curled up in inferred (but unpreserved) egg

A preserved tightly coiled embryo of the dicynodont Lystrosaurus from Early Triassic of South Africa indicates that dicynodonts and other non-cynodont therapsids likely laid eggs as is suggested to be ancestral for amniotes. These eggs were probably soft and leathery like those of living monotreme mammals, which explains the absence of fossilised eggshells attributed to therapsids and other synapsids. There is no evidence that therapsids other than mammals (and possibly some non-mammalian cynodonts) produced milk, and the relatively large size of the eggs of Lystrosaurus suggests they had enough yolk to sufficiently develop to not need it.

== Evolutionary history ==
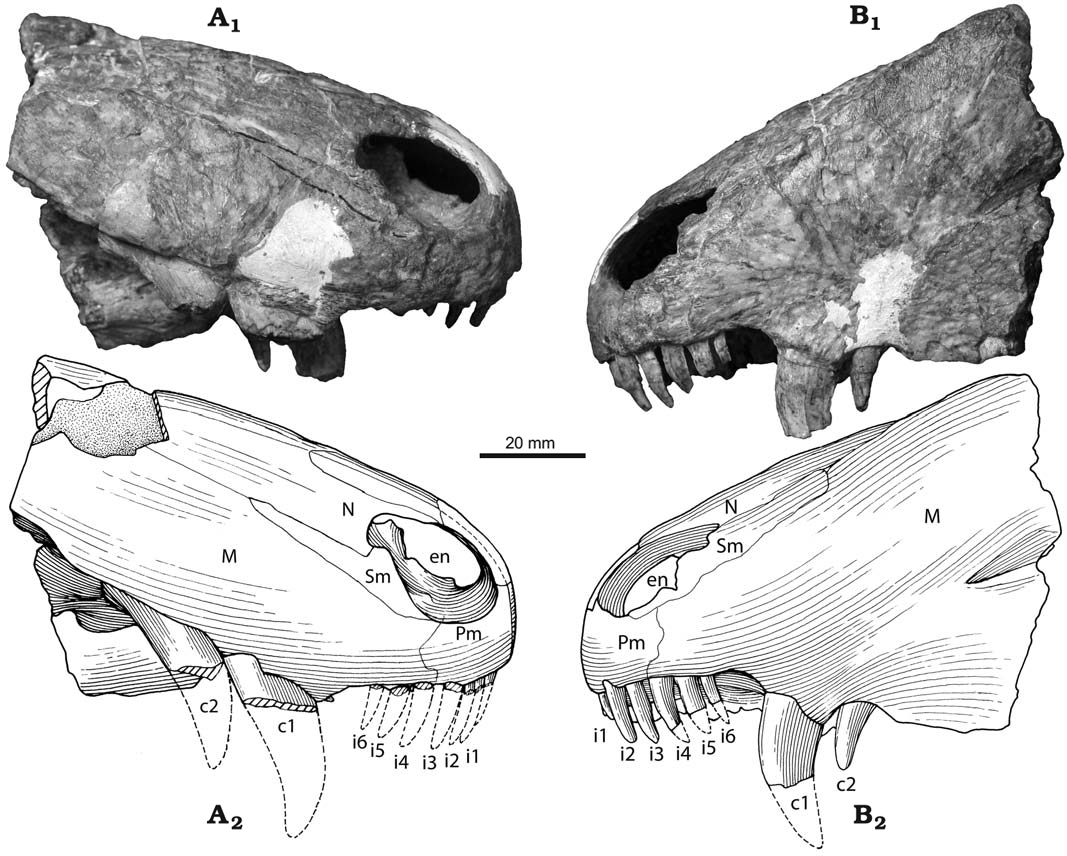
Holotype skull of Raranimus dashankouensis, the most basal-known therapsid

Therapsids are members of the clade Sphenacodontia, with their closest relatives within the primitive "pelycosaur" synapsids being Sphenacodontidae, including the famous Dimetrodon. When they split off from Sphenacodontidae has been debated by experts. A number of studies have suggested that therapsids split off from sphenacontids during the Gzhelian stage of Late Carboniferous, more recent suggested a later split between the Asselian and Sakmarian stage of the Early Permian, though both of these analyses ignore Cryptovenator, generally accepted as a sphenacodontid, which dates to the Carboniferous-Permian boundary c. 300 Ma. The early evolutionary history of the group is obscure, with no confirmed records from the Early Permian (though Tetraceratops has been controversially suggested by some authors to be more closely related to therapsids than to sphenacodontids) leaving a substantial ghost lineage. Therapsids became the dominant land animals in the Middle Permian, displacing the pelycosaurs, though the nature of this transition is obscure due to a poor fossil record at the Early-Middle Permian transition ("Olson's Gap"). Therapsida consists of four major clades: the dinocephalians, the herbivorous anomodonts, the carnivorous biarmosuchians, and the mostly carnivorous theriodonts. After a brief burst of evolutionary diversity, the dinocephalians, while dominant during the Middle Permian, died out at the end of the Middle Permian as part of the end-Captianian mass extinction event, but the anomodont dicynodonts as well as the theriodont gorgonopsians and therocephalians flourished, being joined at the very end of the Permian by the first of the cynodonts.

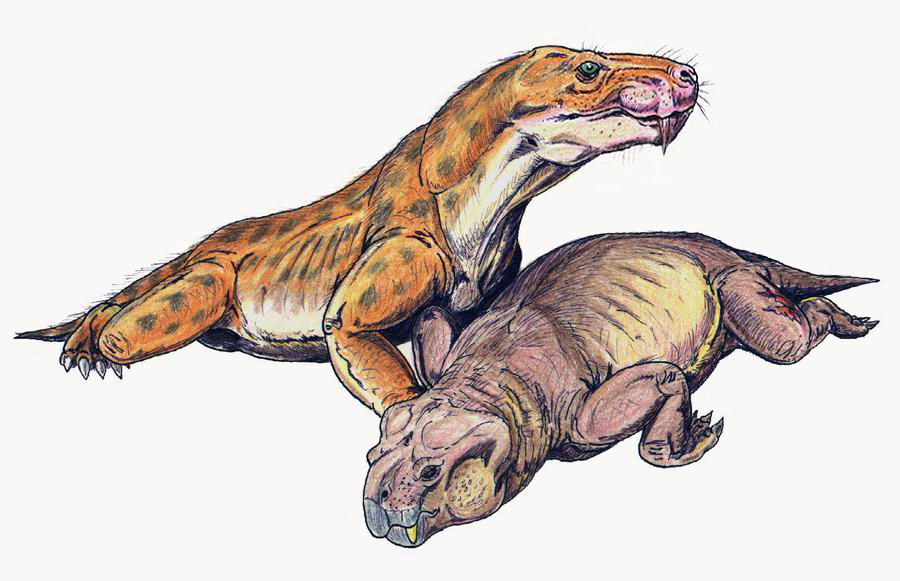
Restoration of Euchambersia with dicynodont prey. Note that this South African therocephalian is suspected to be the oldest-known venomous tetrapod.

Like all land animals, the therapsids were seriously affected by the Permian–Triassic extinction event, with the very successful gorgonopsians and the biarmosuchians dying out altogether and the remaining groups—dicynodonts, therocephalians and cynodonts—reduced to a handful of species each by the earliest Triassic. Surviving dicynodonts were represented by two families of disaster taxa (Lystrosauridae and Myosauridae), the scarcely known Kombuisia, and a single group of large stocky herbivores, the Kannemeyeriiformes, which were the only dicynodont lineage to thrive during the Triassic. They and the medium-sized cynodonts (including both carnivorous and herbivorous forms) flourished worldwide throughout the Early and Middle Triassic. They disappear from the fossil record across much of Pangea at the end of the Carnian (Late Triassic), although they continued for some time longer in the wet equatorial band and the south.

Some exceptions were the still further derived eucynodonts. At least three groups of them survived. They all appeared in the Late Triassic period. The extremely mammal-like family, Tritylodontidae, survived into the Early Cretaceous. Another extremely mammal-like family, Tritheledontidae, are unknown later than the Early Jurassic. Mammaliaformes was the third group, including Morganucodon and similar animals. Some taxonomists refer to these animals as "mammals", though most limit the term to the mammalian crown group.

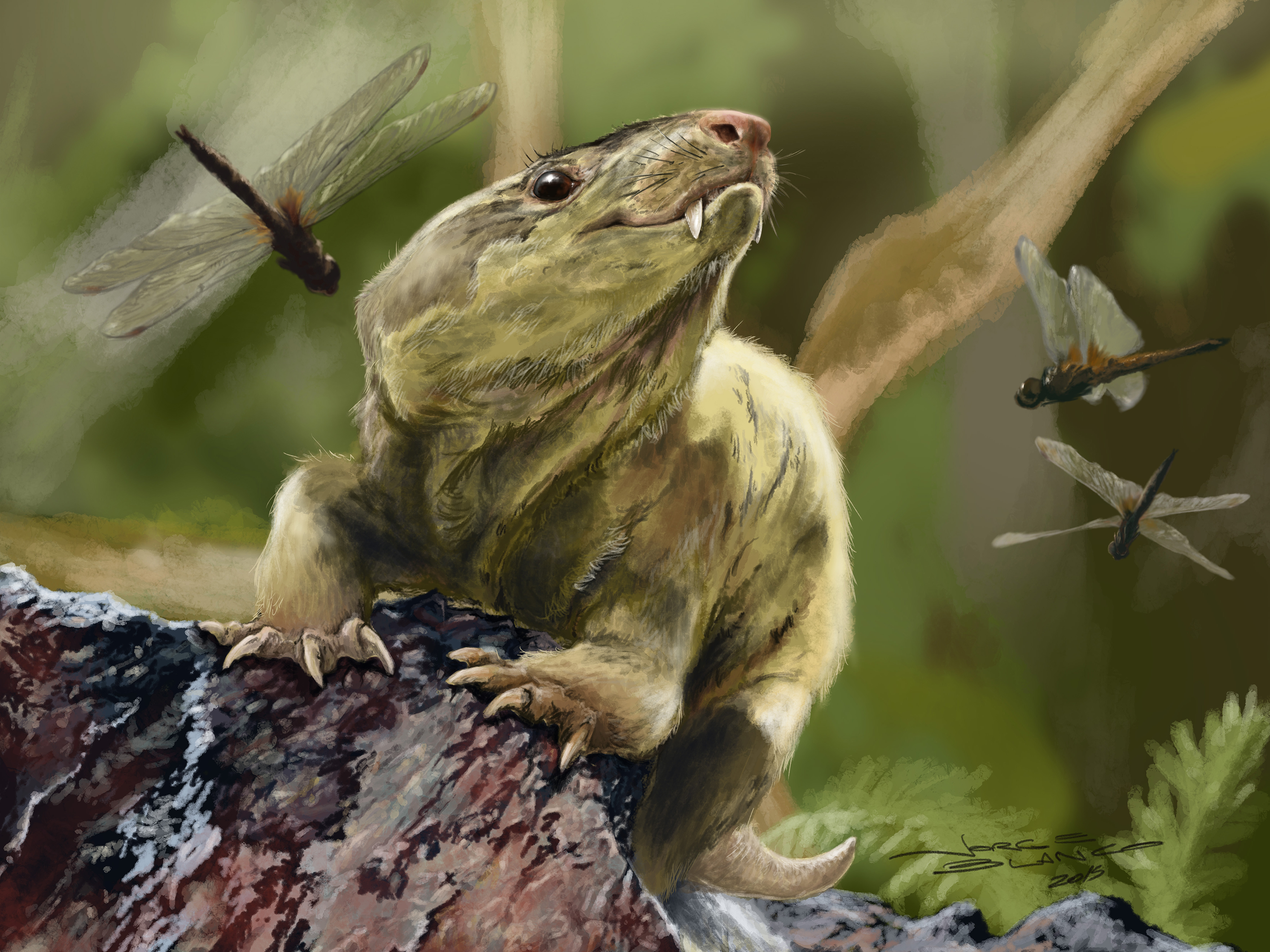
Reconstruction of Bonacynodon schultzi, a probainognathian cynodont related to the ancestors of mammals

The non-eucynodont cynodonts survived the Permian–Triassic extinction; Thrinaxodon, Galesaurus and Platycraniellus are known from the Early Triassic. By the Middle Triassic, however, only the eucynodonts remained.

The therocephalians, relatives of the cynodonts, managed to survive the Permian–Triassic extinction and continued to diversify through the Early Triassic period. Approaching the end of the period, however, the therocephalians were in decline to eventual extinction, likely outcompeted by the rapidly diversifying Saurian lineage of diapsids, equipped with sophisticated respiratory systems better suited to the very hot, dry and oxygen-poor world of the End-Triassic.

Dicynodonts were among the most successful groups of therapsids during the Late Permian; they survived through to near the end of the Triassic.

Mammals are the only living therapsids. The mammalian crown group, which evolved in the Early Jurassic period, radiated from a group of mammaliaforms that included the docodonts. The mammaliaforms themselves evolved from probainognathians, a lineage of the eucynodont suborder.

== Classification ==
Classical view of therapsid relationships, after Rubidge and Sidor, 2001:

- Sphenacodontia
  - Sphenacodontidae
  - Therapsida
    - Biarmosuchia
    - Eutherapsida
      - Dinocephalia
      - Neotherapsida
        - Anomodontia (incl. Dicynodontia)
        - Theriodontia
          - Gorgonopsia
          - Eutheriodontia
            - Therocephalia
            - Cynodontia (incl. Mammalia)

Six major groups of therapsids are generally recognized: Biarmosuchia, Dinocephalia, Anomodontia, Gorgonopsia, Therocephalia and Cynodontia. A clade uniting therocephalians and cynodonts, called Eutheriodontia, is well supported, but relationships among the other four clades are controversial. The most widely accepted hypothesis of therapsid relationships, the Hopson and Barghausen paradigm, was first proposed in 1986. Under this hypothesis, biarmosuchians are the earliest-diverging major therapsid group, with the other five groups forming the Eutherapsida, and within Eutherapsida, gorgonopsians are the sister taxon of eutheriodonts, together forming the Theriodontia. Hopson and Barghausen did not initially come to a conclusion about how dinocephalians, anomodonts and theriodonts were related to each other, but subsequent studies suggested that anomodonts and theriodonts should be classified together as the Neotherapsida. However, there remains debate over these relationships; in particular, some studies have suggested that anomodonts, not gorgonopsians, are the sister taxon of Eutheriodontia, other studies have found dinocephalians and anomodonts to form a clade, and both the phylogenetic position and monophyly of Biarmosuchia remain controversial.

Some studies have found Biarmosuchia and Dinocephalia more closely related to each other than to other therapsids, forming the clade Dinomorpha.

In addition to the six major groups, there are several other lineages and species of uncertain classification. Raranimus from the early Middle Permian of China is likely to be the earliest-diverging known therapsid. Tetraceratops from the Early Permian of the United States has been hypothesized to be an even earlier-diverging therapsid, but more recent study has suggested it is more likely to be a non-therapsid sphenacodontian.

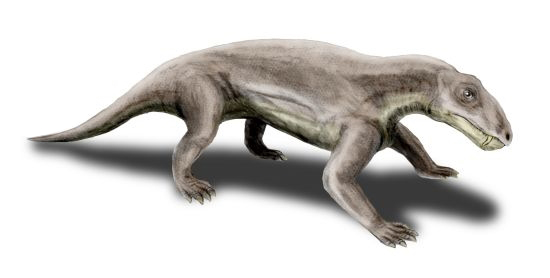
Biarmosuchus, a biarmosuchian

=== Biarmosuchia ===
Biarmosuchia is the most recently recognized therapsid clade, first recognized as a distinct lineage by Hopson and Barghausen in 1986 and formally named by Sigogneau-Russell in 1989. Most biarmosuchians were previously classified as gorgonopsians. Biarmosuchia includes the distinctive Burnetiamorpha, but support for the monophyly of Biarmosuchia is relatively low. Many biarmosuchians are known for extensive cranial ornamentation.

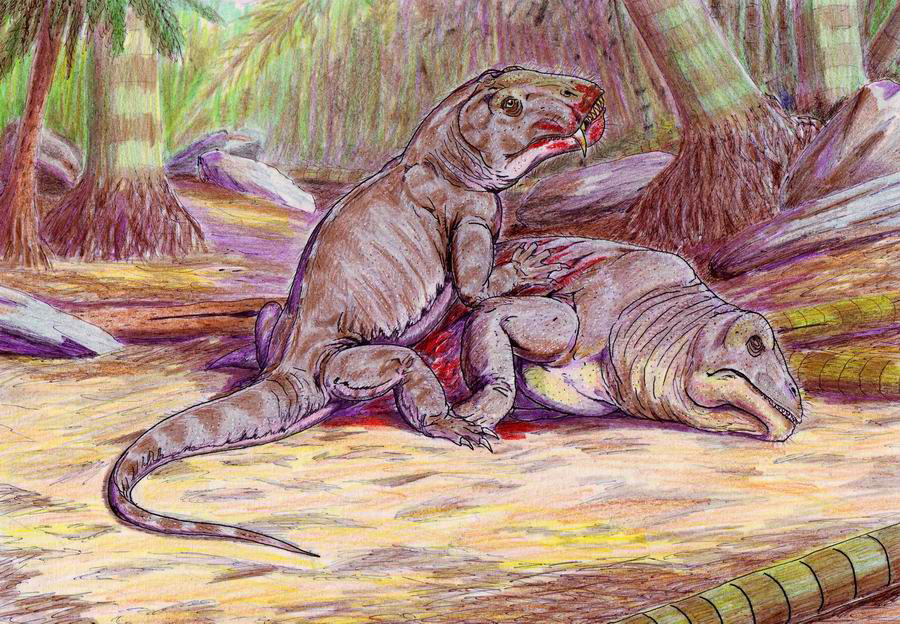
Two genera of dinocephalians : Titanophoneus (an anteosaur) devouring a Ulemosaurus (a tapinocephalian)

=== Dinocephalia ===
Dinocephalia comprises two distinctive groups, the Anteosauria and Tapinocephalia.

Historically, carnivorous dinocephalians, including both anteosaurs and titanosuchids, were called titanosuchians and classified as members of Theriodontia, while the herbivorous Tapinocephalidae were classified as members of Anomodontia.

=== Anomodontia ===
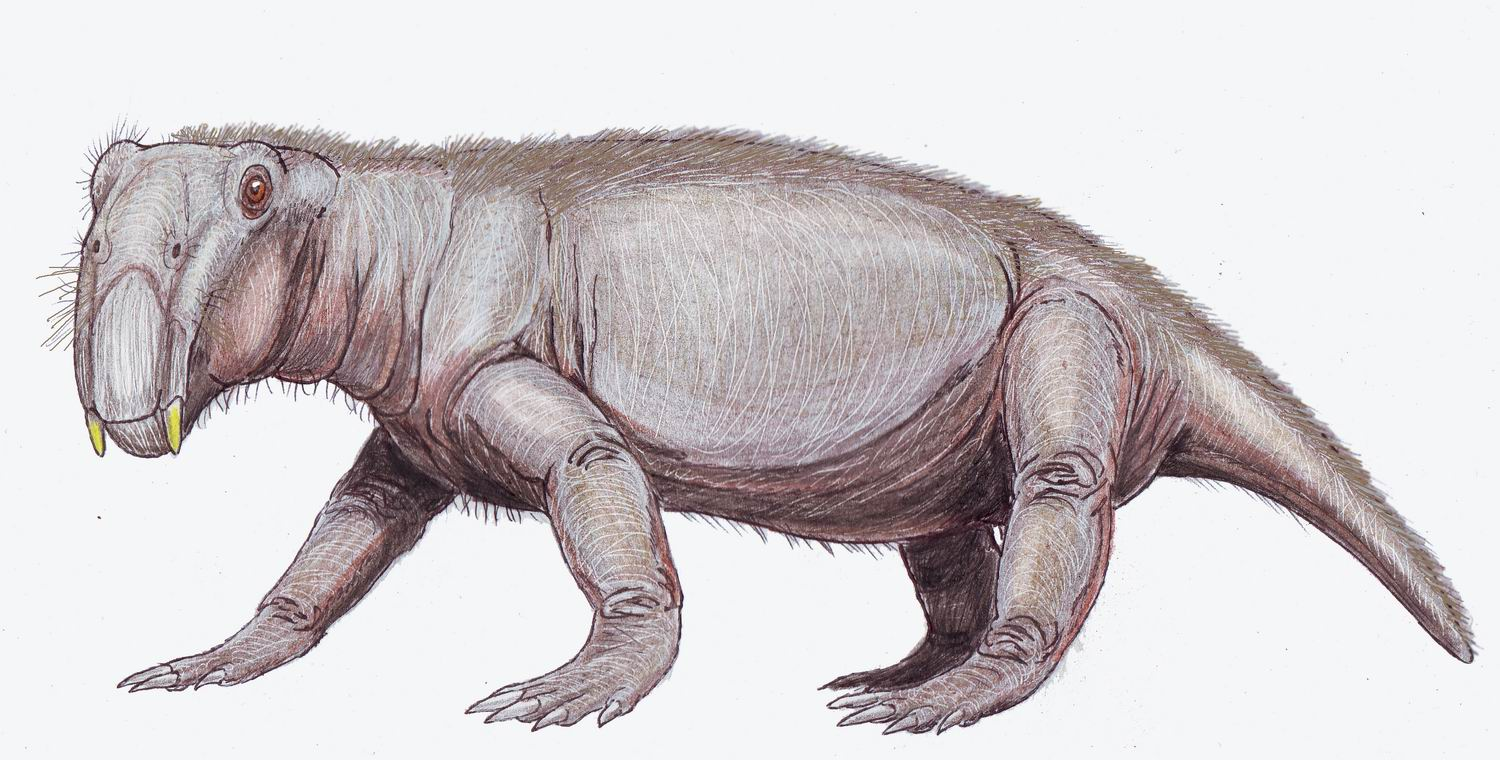
Lystrosaurus, a dicynodont anomodont

Anomodontia includes the dicynodonts, a clade of tusked, beaked herbivores, and the most diverse and long-lived clade of non-cynodont therapsids. Other members of Anomodontia include Suminia, which is thought to have been a climbing form.

=== Gorgonopsia ===
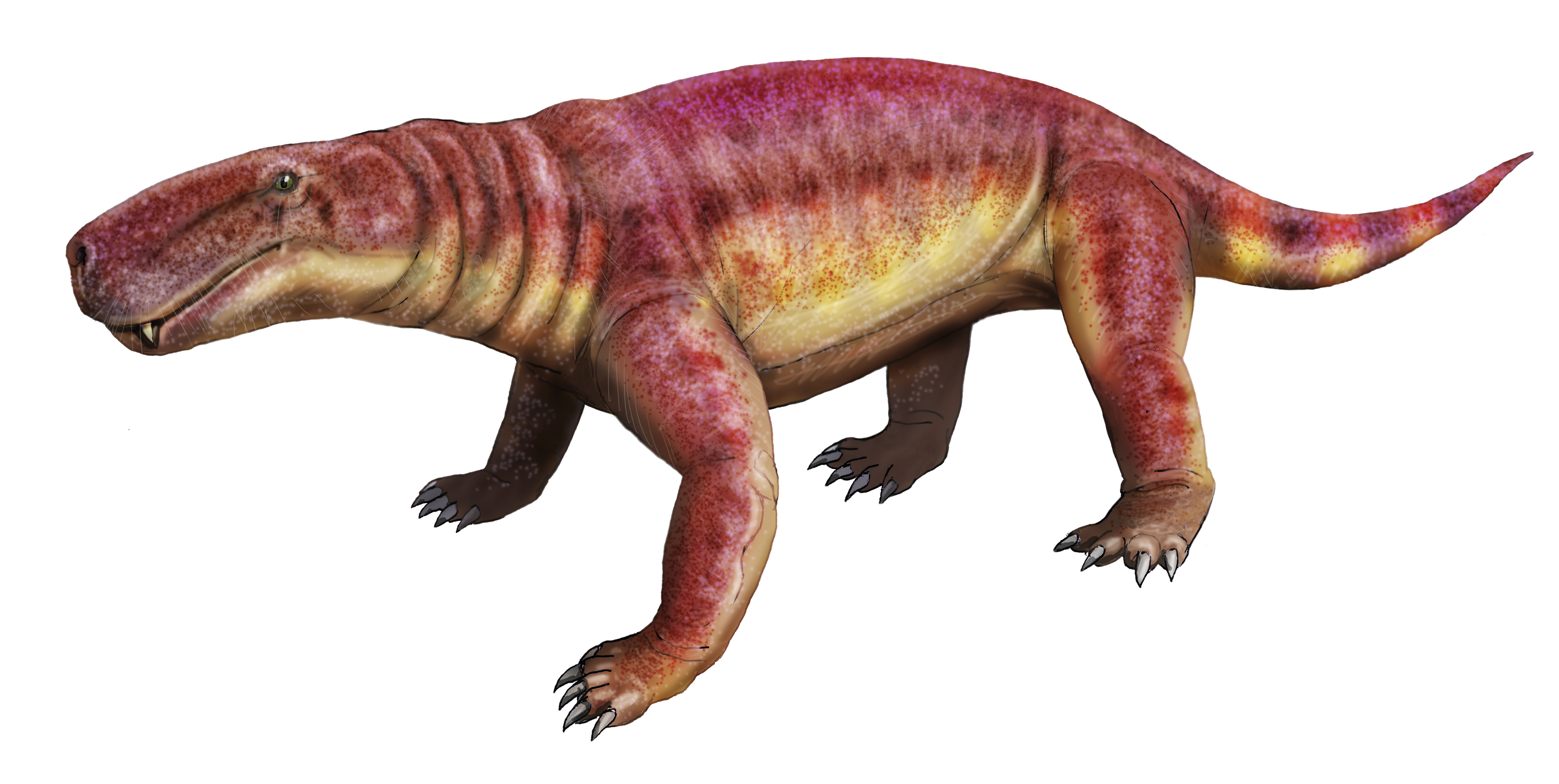
Inostrancevia, a gorgonopsian

Gorgonopsia is an abundant but morphologically homogeneous group of saber-toothed predators.

=== Therocephalia ===
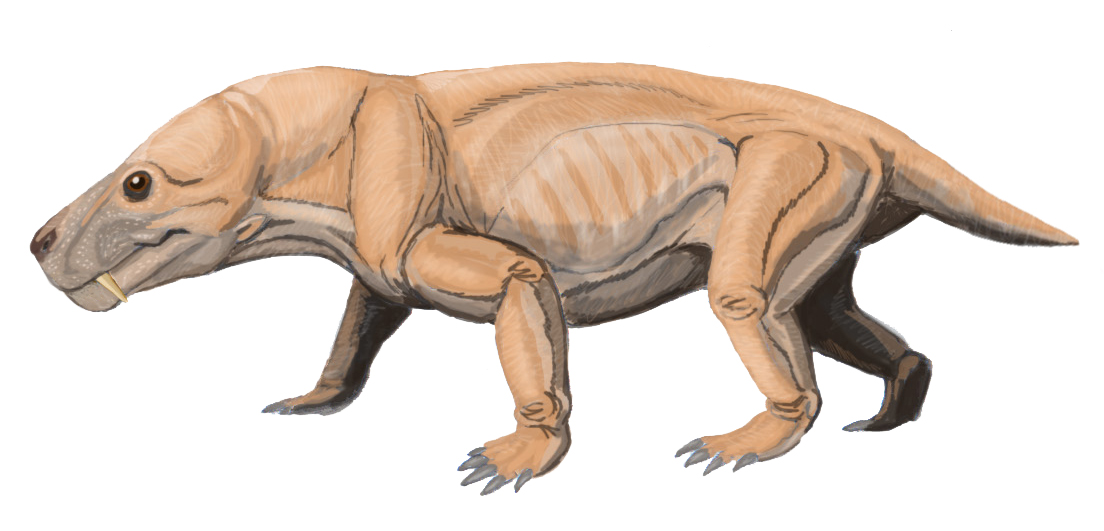
Moschorhinus, a therocephalian

It has been suggested that Therocephalia might not be monophyletic, with some species more closely related to cynodonts than others. However, most studies regard Therocephalia as monophyletic.

=== Cynodontia ===
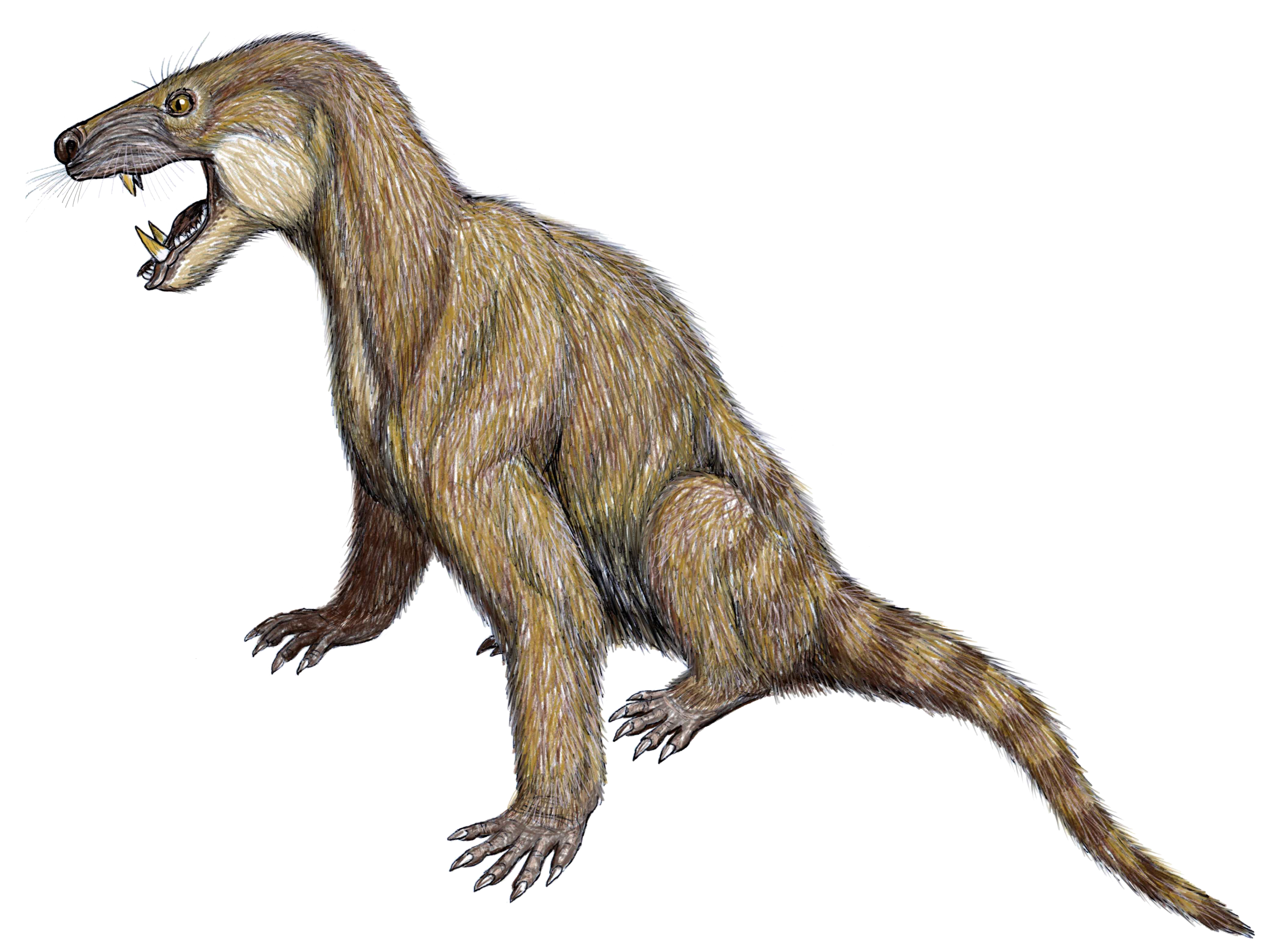
Trucidocynodon, a non-mammalian cynodont

Cynodonts are the most diverse and longest-lived of the therapsid groups, as Cynodontia includes mammals. Cynodonts are the only major therapsid clade to lack a Middle Permian fossil record, with the earliest-known cynodont being Charassognathus from the Wuchiapingian age of the Late Permian. Non-mammalian cynodonts include both carnivorous and herbivorous forms.

== See also ==
- Evolution of mammals
- Timeline of the evolutionary history of life
- Vertebrate paleontology
