= Endothiodon Assemblage Zone =

Permian biozone in South Africa

- Stratigraphic range: mid–upper Permian (Capitanian–Wuchiapingian), ~260–256.8 Ma
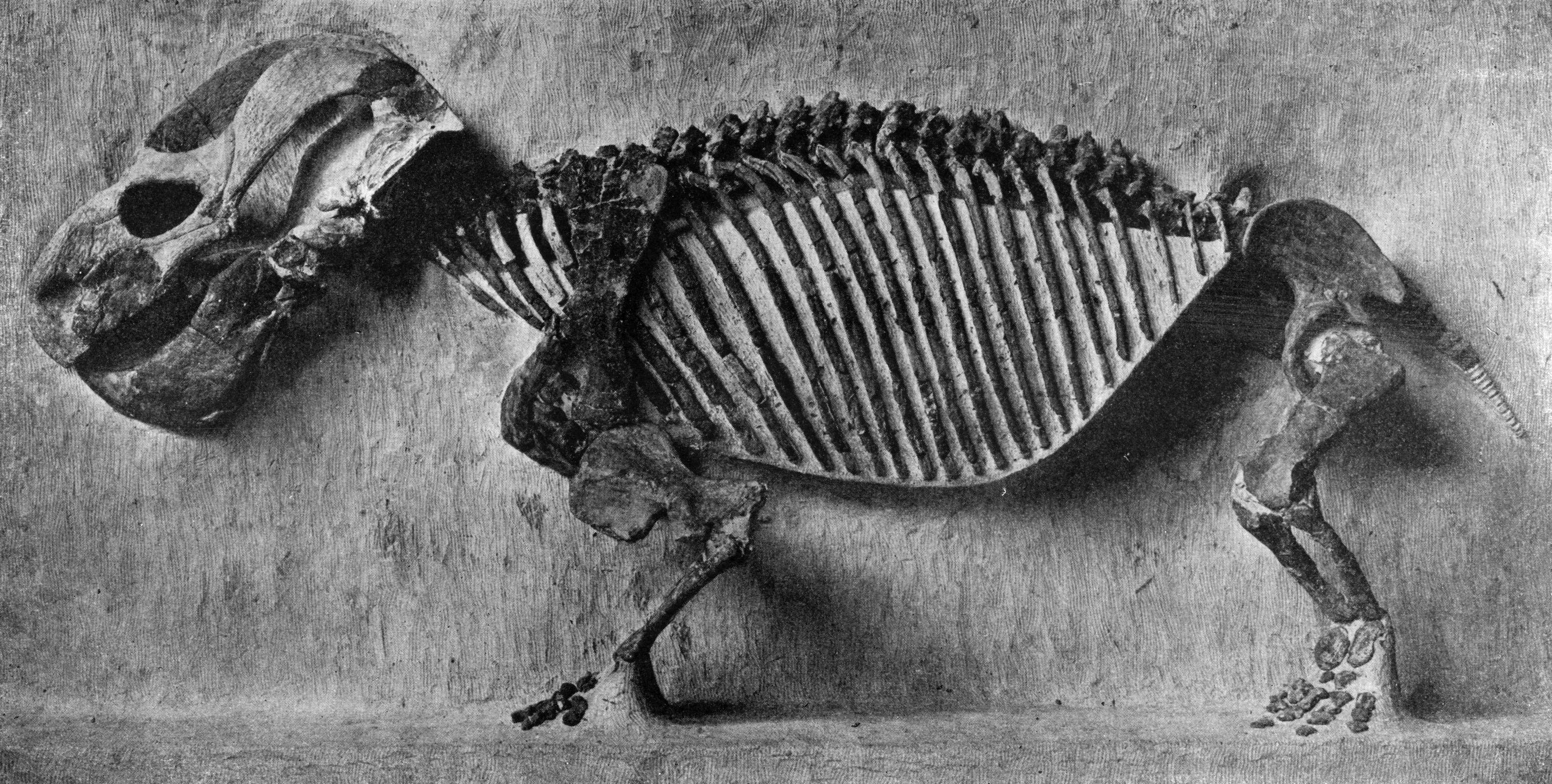
- Skeleton of Endothiodon bathystoma, the defining fossil of the EAZ
- Type: Biozone
- Unit of: Middleton and lower Teekloof formations; Beaufort Group
- Underlies: Cistecephalus Assemblage Zone
- Overlies: Tapinocephalus Assemblage Zone
- Thickness: up to 250 metres (820 ft)

Location
- Region: Northern, Western & Eastern Cape
- Country: South Africa
- Extent: Karoo Basin

Type section
- Named for: Endothiodon bathystoma
- Named by: Day & Smith
- Year defined: 2020

The Endothiodon Assemblage Zone is a tetrapod assemblage zone (also called a biozone) in the Adelaide Subgroup of the Beaufort Group, a fossiliferous and geologically important geological group of the Karoo Supergroup in South Africa. Outcrops of the lower Teekloof Formation and much of the Middleton Formation represent this assemblage zone, and other formations throughout Africa have also been correlated to it. The Endothiodon Assemblage Zone (EAZ) is the third oldest biozone of the Beaufort Group, dated to around 260 to 257 million years ago in the middle to late Permian period. It follows the older Tapinocephalus and Eodicynodon assemblage zones, and is named for the relative abundance and distinctiveness of the herbivorous dicynodont therapsid Endothiodon in this unit.

The Endothiodon Assemblage Zone is further divided into the stratigraphically lower (older) Lycosuchus - Eunotosaurus Subzone and higher (younger) Tropidostoma - Gorgonops Subzone. The thickest outcrops are located along the Nuweveld region of the Great Escarpment, and preserve the depositional environments of rivers and lakes. The EAZ overlaps with the Capitanian mass extinction event and, as such, preserves a record of ecosystem recovery immediately after this event. Many animals are represented by the EAZ, including diverse dicynodonts, gorgonopsians, therocephalians, biarmosuchians, cynodontians, early reptiles, and temnospondyls.

Like other assemblage zones in the Beaufort Group, the Endothiodon AZ has a convoluted history, having been referred to under several different names and definitions; from 1906 to 1970, the biozone was deemed either the "Endothiodon Beds" or "Endothiodon Zone". It was then lumped into the younger Cistecephalus Zone in 1970, before being split into two separate zones—the lower Pristerognathus AZ and upper Tropidostoma AZ—in 1978. In 2020, a revision of the Beaufort Group recombined these assemblage zones into a newly redefined Endothiodon AZ.

== History ==
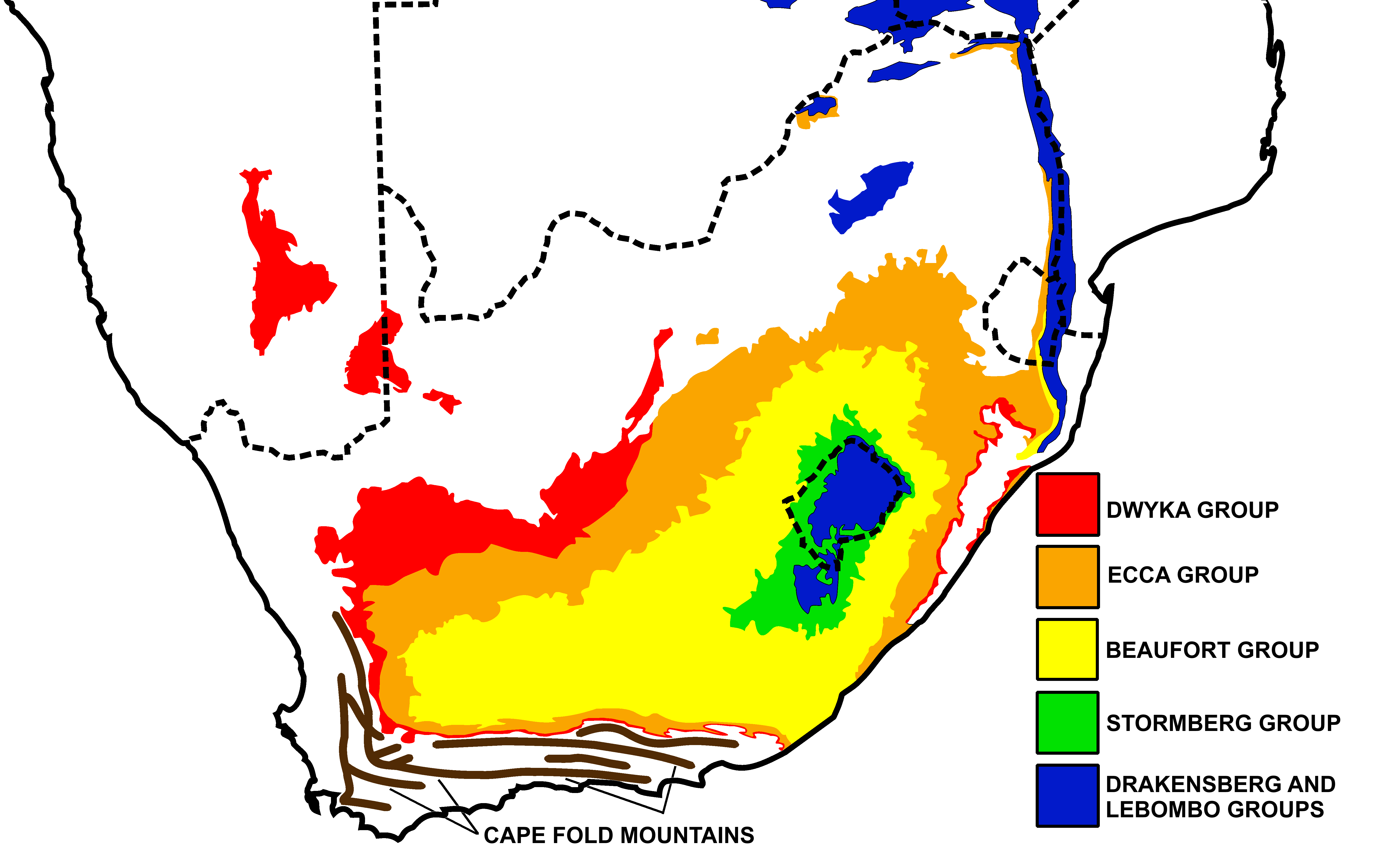
Geological map of Karoo Supergroup outcrops in southern Africa. The Endothiodon AZ is part of the Beaufort Group (yellow)

In 1889, British palaeontologist Harry Seeley travelled to South Africa to conduct fieldwork in the Karoo Supergroup. He recognized that, as one traveled up the Nuweveld Escarpment, the outcrops demonstrated noticeably distinct zones; after discussing the pareiasaur fossils in the lower levels in a lecture delivered that year, he noted:

The upper beds of the rocks which we examined now began to yield to us saurians of a somewhat different nature; the limbs were longer, the head somewhat different in form, and furnished with marvellous tusks, whilst the body was somewhat more arched in its contour; the hind limbs were better adapted for walking on land, the tail apparently shorter than had been the case before, and these animals possessed tusks which at first sight resembled the tusks of the dog tribe—the type which came to be known as the dicynodon family... Now these occurred in the zone of rock which goes immediately above that which yields the large type of pareiasaurus.

This faunal transition Seeley observed is now recognized as one of the most distinct biotic changes in the succession of the Beaufort Group, marking the end of what is now the Tapinocephalus Assemblage Zone (Guadalupian fauna) and the younger and stratigraphically higher Lopingian faunas. In an 1892 discussion on the geological horizons (levels of rock outcrops) is South Africa, Seeley recognized the division of these layers into biozones based on their vertebrate content, and referred to these higher assemblages as the "zone of Dicynodonts" in a scheme comprising five distinct zones, three of which are part of the Beaufort Group.

After Scottish-born palaeontologist Robert Broom observed some of the South African fossils Seeley brought to England, he recognized their biological significance and sailed to South Africa to begin collecting and studying fossils in the Karoo region. In 1906, he proposed an updated, more precise biostratigraphic division scheme for the Beaufort Group. Herein, Broom split Seeley's "zone of Dicynodonts" into a lower and upper section, regarded as the "Endothiodon" and "Kistecephalus" beds, respectively.

Broom subsequently tabulated the relative abundance of fossil taxa in his proposed biozones in a 1909 occurrence list. Two years later, English zoologist D. M. S. Watson visited the South African outcrops. In 1914, he claimed that no pariasaurian or dinocephalian remains had been found in the Endothiodon Beds, but that abundant therocephalians and gorgonopsids were present in addition to large 'endothiodon' and very small 'dicynodon' specimens. This conflicted with Broom's list, which noted the presence of large 'dicynodons' and the pareiasaur "Propappus" (now regarded as a synonym of Pareiasaurus). Watson characterized the Endothiodon based on the presence of this genus in addition to "other large Endothiodonts and peculiar Gorgonopsids, and by the total absence of large Dicynodons".

Subsequent research by English-South African palaeontologist Sidney H. Haughton reiterated the presence of "Propappus" in these layers. Haughton further noted that, in relation to the preceding Tapinocephalus Zone (renamed from Pareiasaurus Zone due to the absence of this genus in those layers), the Endothiodon Zone has a striking absence of large-bodied animals.

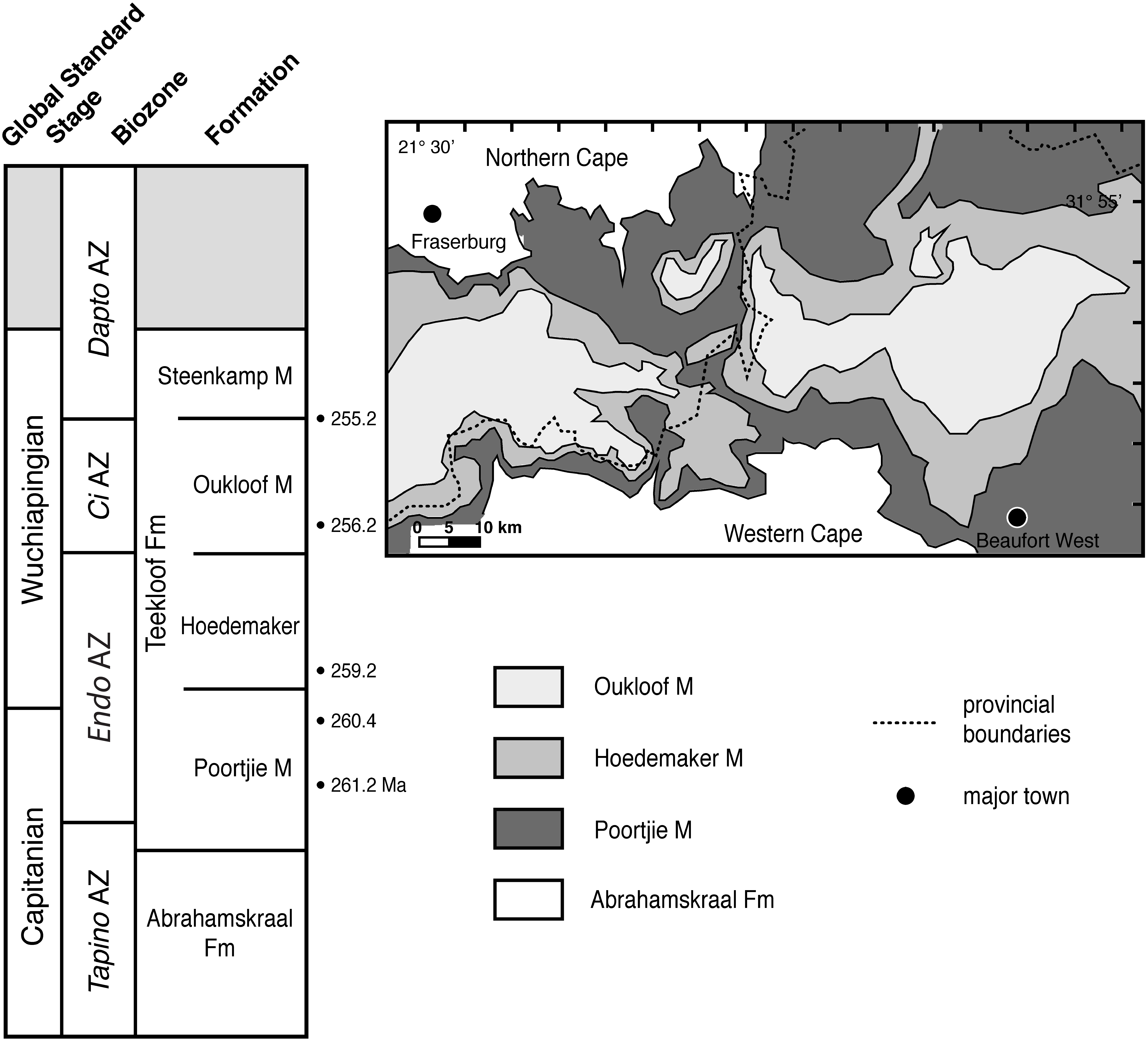
Geological context of the EAZ and Teekloof Formation

In 1970, South African paleontologist James W. Kitching proposed the absorption of the Endothiodon Zone into the lower part of the younger Cistecephalus Zone. This was due to concerns that the two were lithologically (i.e., the physical structure of the rock outcrops) indistinguishable, as well the fact that Endothiodon was especially common around the Beaufort West locality, but not in localities northward, where it co-occurred with Cistecephalus. However, the fossils Kitching collected were almost all from the upper part of the range of Endothiodon, while its lower range has less widely exposed outcrops. Eight years later, André W. Keyser and Roger M. H. Smith proposed an updated biozonation scheme for the Beaufort Group. This included the recognition of two novel biozones between the Tapinocephalus and Cistecephalus zones, in the place of the traditional Endothiodon Zone: the lower Pristerognathus/Diictodon Assemblage Zone and the upper Tropidostoma microtrema (or Tropidostoma-Endothiodon AZ, per the now-abandoned two-name scheme) assemblage zone. In a 1995 volume discussing each Beaufort Group assemblage zone separately, published in association with the South African Committee for Stratigraphy (S.A.C.S.), these two zones were formally recognized as the Pristerognathus and Tropidostoma assemblage zones. After 1995, these two assemblage zones were implemented widely in place of the historic "Endothiodon Zone".

In 2020, Michael O. Day and Roger M. H. Smith reassessed the Pristerognathus AZ and Tropidostoma AZ as part of a significantly updated and extended version of the 1995 Beaufort Group volume. They recognized shortcomings in the previous classification scheme, including the presence of the index fossil Oudenodon and Cistecephalus together in the range of Tropidostoma. Based on more recent collecting, the abundance of Endothiodon was better understood; this genus appears, reaching its highest abundance, before any recorded instances of Tropidostoma. Furthermore, the vertebrate fauna of the upper part of the "Pristerognathus AZ" is more similar to the "Tropidostoma AZ" than it is to its own lower part. Using a combination of these new fossil discoveries, an updated understanding of the regional stratigraphy, and novel taxonomic interpretations, Day & Smith combined these two zones into a redefined Endothiodon Assemblage Zone, excluding the lower third of the Pristerognathus AZ, which was grouped with the more similar Tapinocephalus AZ. This name has been adopted by researchers in the scientific literature since then.

Historical summary of Beaufort Group biostratigraphic schemes
	Seeley, 1892	Broom, 1906	Haughton, 1919	Kitching, 1970	Keyser & Smith, 1978/1980	Rubidge, 1990	S.A.C.S., 1995	Smith et al., 2020
⇑ youngest layers Beaufort Group oldest layers ⇓	zone of "highly specialized" Theriodonts	Cynognathus Beds	Cynognathus Zone	Cynognathus Zone	Kannemeyeria-Diademodon AZ	Kannemeyeria-Diademodon AZ	Cynognathus AZ	Cynognathus Assemblage Zone
⇑ youngest layers Beaufort Group oldest layers ⇓	—	Lystrosaurus beds	Lystrosaurus Zone	Lystrosaurus Zone	Lystrosaurus-Thrinaxodon AZ	Lystrosaurus-Thrinaxodon AZ	Lystrosaurus AZ	Lystrosaurus declivis Assemblage Zone
⇑ youngest layers Beaufort Group oldest layers ⇓	—	Procolophon Beds	Procolophon Zone	Lystrosaurus Zone	Lystrosaurus-Thrinaxodon AZ	Lystrosaurus-Thrinaxodon AZ	Lystrosaurus AZ	Lystrosaurus declivis Assemblage Zone
⇑ youngest layers Beaufort Group oldest layers ⇓	—	—	—	Daptocephalus Zone	Dicynodon lacerticeps-Whaitsia AZ	Dicynodon lacerticeps-Whaitsia AZ	Dicynodon AZ	Daptocephalus Assemblage Zone
⇑ youngest layers Beaufort Group oldest layers ⇓	zone of Dicynodonts	Kistecephalus Beds	Cistecephalus Zone	Cistecephalus Range Zone	Aulacephalodon-Cistecephalus AZ	Aulacephalodon-Cistecephalus AZ	Cistecephalus AZ	Cistecephalus Assemblage Zone
⇑ youngest layers Beaufort Group oldest layers ⇓	zone of Dicynodonts	Endothiodon Beds	Endothiodon Zone	Cistecephalus Range Zone	Tropidostoma-Endothiodon AZ	Tropidostoma-Endothiodon AZ	Tropidostoma AZ	Endothiodon Assemblage Zone
⇑ youngest layers Beaufort Group oldest layers ⇓	zone of Dicynodonts	Endothiodon Beds	Endothiodon Zone	Cistecephalus Range Zone	Pristerognathus-Diictodon AZ	Pristerognathus-Diictodon AZ	Pristerognathus AZ	Endothiodon Assemblage Zone
⇑ youngest layers Beaufort Group oldest layers ⇓	zone of Pareiasaurians	Pareiasaurus Beds	Tapinocephalus Zone	Tapinocephalus Zone	Dinocephalia / Tapinocephalus-Bradysaurus Assemblage Zone (AZ)	Dinocephalia (Tapinocephalus) AZ	Tapinocephalus AZ	Tapinocephalus Assemblage Zone
⇑ youngest layers Beaufort Group oldest layers ⇓	—	—	—	—	—	Eodicynodon-Tapinocaninus AZ	Eodicynodon AZ	Eodicynodon Assemblage Zone
Key: zone(s) overlapping or partially equivalent to the modern EAZ concept zones directly equivalent to the modern EAZ concept

== Lithology and description ==
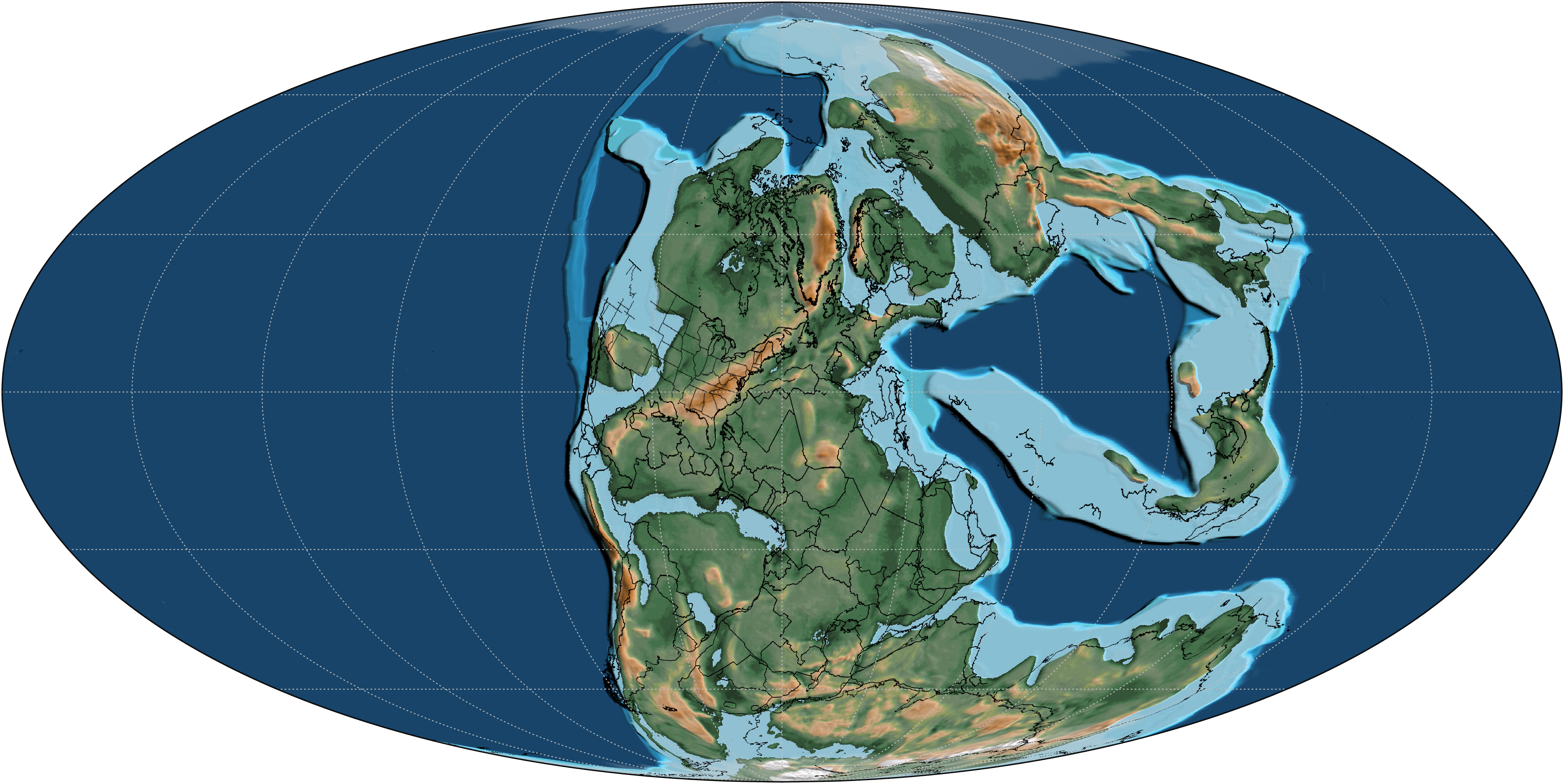
Palaeogeographic map of Earth during the Wuchiapingian age

The Endothiodon Assemblage Zone comprises two distinct subzones characterized by differences in faunal composition and lithology. The Lycosuchus - Eunotosaurus Subzone is stratigraphically lower (older in age), and is roughly equivalent to the upper two-thirds of the former "Pristerognathus Assemblage Zone". The lower third of the Pristerognathus AZ was transferred to the uppermost Tapinocephalus AZ. Meanwhile, the Tropidostoma - Gorgonops Subzone is stratigraphically higher (younger in age), and is directly equivalent to the former "Tropidostoma Assemblage Zone". Overall, the Endothiodon AZ generally corresponds with the lower Teekloof Formation (most of the Poortjie and Hoedemaker members) and much of the Middleton Formation, two units of the Adelaide Subgroup of the Beaufort Group. The base of the lower subzone (and the AZ as a whole) is dated to 260 million years ago, while the top of the upper subzone (and the AZ as a whole) is dated to 256.8 million years ago. As such, it spans from the latest Capitanian age to the mid-Wuchiapingian age, crossing the boundary between the Guadalupian and Lopingian epochs near the end of the Permian period.

Various geological formations and basins in Africa have been correlated to the EAZ. Among these are the upper Madumabisa Mudstone Formation in Zambia's Luangwa Basin and Zimbabwe's mid-Zambezi Basin, Malawi's Chiweta Beds, Mozambique's Lunho Series, Namibia's lower Omingonde Formation, and the upper Ruhuhu and lower Usili formations in Tanzania's Ruhuhu Basin.

=== Lycosuchus - Eunotosaurus Subzone ===
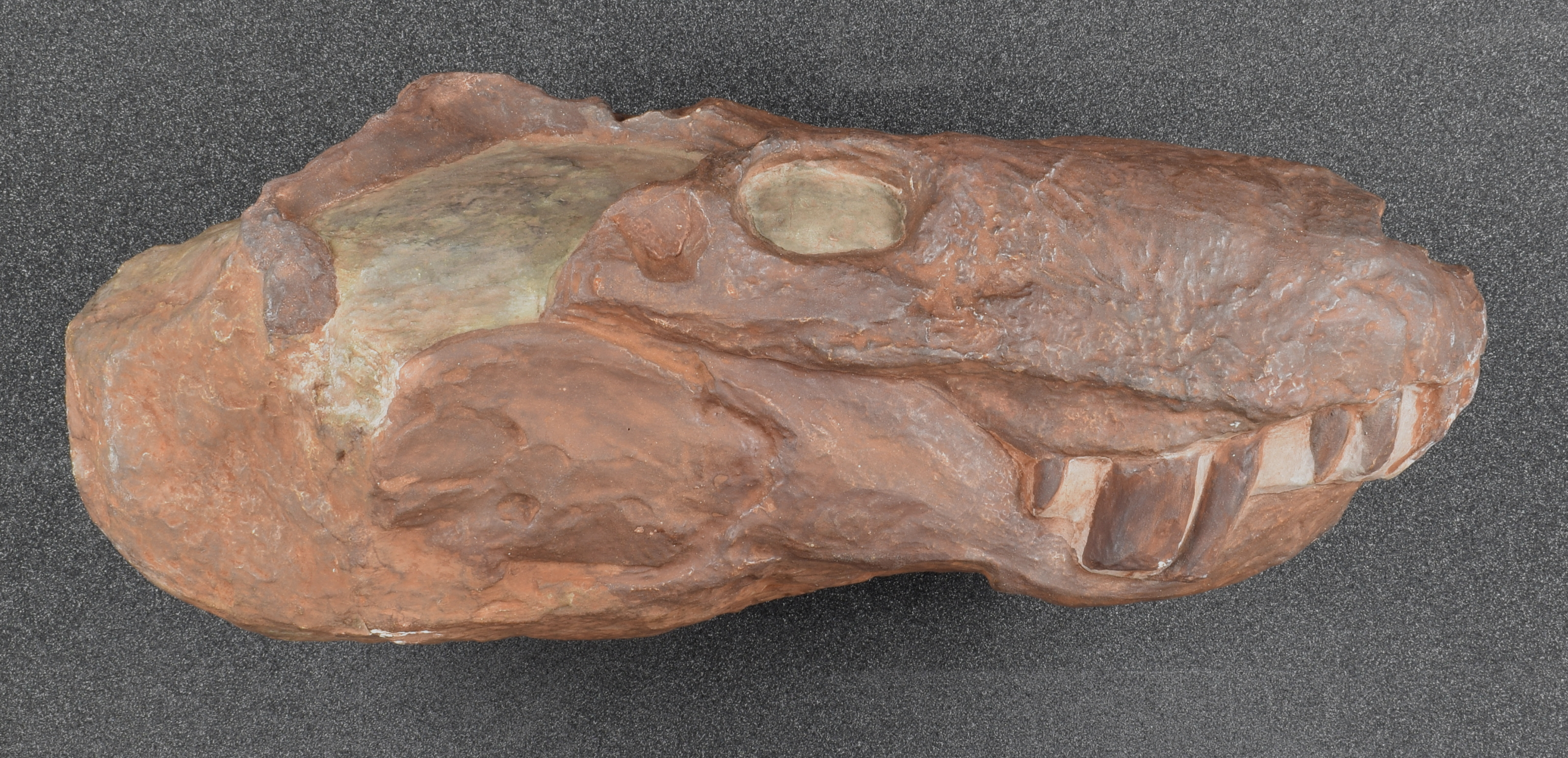
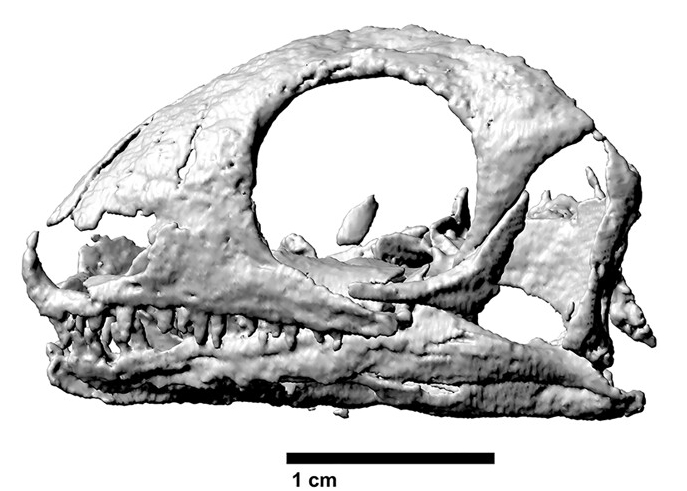
Skulls of Lycosuchus and Eunotosaurus, the defining genera of this subzone

This subzone is named and defined based on the co-occurrence of the namesake Endothiodon with the distinctive taxa Lycosuchus (a therocephalian) and Eunotosaurus (an early reptile). Both of these genera are also found in the lower Tapinocephalus AZ, but they do not exist with Endothiodon here. In the southwest region of the Karoo Basin, the Lycosuchus - Eunotosaurus Subzone correlates with the upper two-thirds of the Poortjie Member of the Teekloof Formation, and its upper boundary (that contacts the Tropidostoma - Gorgonops Subzone) lines up with the base of the overlying Hoedemaker Member of this formation. In the southeast part of the Karoo Basin, this subzone correlates with the lower part of the Middleton Formation. Parts of the subzone also correlate with the Abrahamskraal Formation, which lies below the Teekloof and Middleton formations.

The base of this subzone is defined based on the first occurrence of the genus Endothiodon, matching the definition for the onset of the assemblage zone as a whole. The age of the base is well-constrained based on radiometric dates from the Poortjie Member, at 260.259 ± 0.081 million years ago. The upper boundary is defined based on the first occurrence of Tropidostoma (which defines the upper subzone). Its age is less well-constrained, but is most likely between 259 to 258 million years ago (latest Capitanian to earliest Wuchiapingian).

The Lycosuchus - Eunotosaurus Subzone has outcrops along the Nuweveld Escarpment west of Beaufort West. They are around 100 metres (330 ft) thick here, between Sutherland and Beaufort West. These outcrops are characterized by a higher sandstone/mudrock ratio (1:2) compared to the higher and lower layers, as well as a sudden increase in sandstone bodies at the base. The mudrocks are composed of dark reddish-brown mudstone and greenish-grey siltstone. The rocks were deposited during a period of tectonic activity and uplift (Gondwanide orogeny). This activity resulted in the creation of several braided streams flowing northeast toward an intracontinental sea. Rock outcrops of this subzone are associated in some places with sheets of silicified mudrock rich in volcanic ash. These ashfall events were likely detrimental to broad-leaved plants, and thus the large browsing herbivores, while smaller herbivores were likely unaffected.

In 2012, Michael Benton and colleagues described the "Kotel'nich fauna", a Permian vertebrate assemblage in the Vanyushonki Member of Russia. Based on the fauna observed here, including both basal and derived therapsids, this locality has been correlated with the original "Pristerognathus AZ". It can likely be correlated with the Lycosuchus - Eunotosaurus Subzone of the EAZ.

=== Tropidostoma - Gorgonops Subzone ===
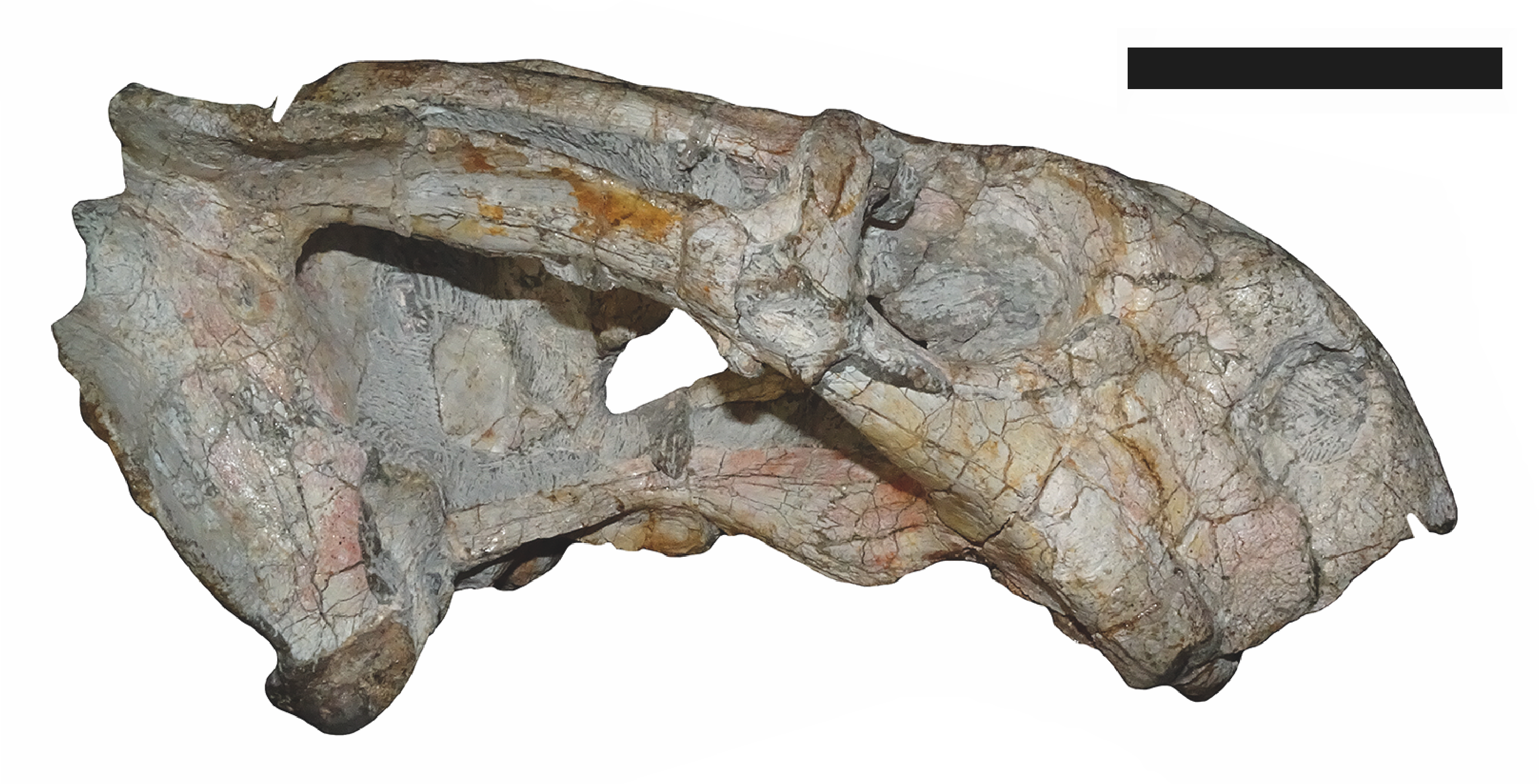
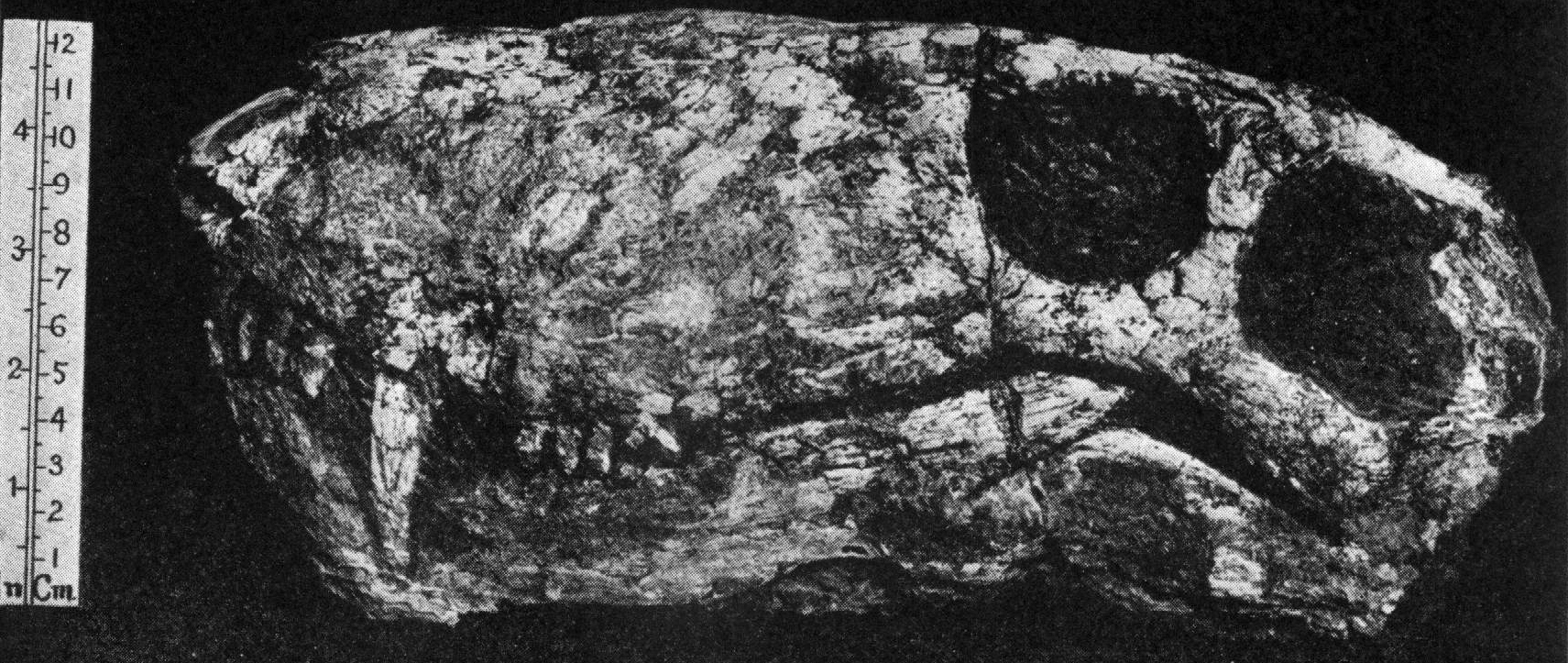
Skulls of Tropidostoma and Gorgonops, the defining genera of this subzone

This subzone is named and defined based on the co-occurrence of the namesake Endothiodon with the fellow dicynodont Tropidostoma, a common animal largely constrained to this subzone, and Gorgonops, a gorgonopsian that first appears in the Lycosuchus - Eunotosaurus Subzone but is more common in these higher layers. In the southwest region of the Karoo Basin, the Tropidostoma - Gorgonops Subzone correlates with most of the Hoedemaker Member of the Teekloof Formation. Eastward, this subzone correlates with the middle to upper parts of the Middleton Formation. Near Victoria West, an assemblage comparable to this subzone may occur in rocks of the Poortjie Member of the Teekloof Formation, although this is more uncertain.

The base of this subzone is defined based on the first occurrence of the species Tropidostoma dubium. The base has been radiometrically dated to about 258 million years ago. The upper boundary is defined based on the earliest instance of the dicynodont species Aulacephalodon bainii co-occurring with the dicynodonts Cistecephalus and Oudenodon, which also matches the end of the assemblage zone as a whole, and the onset of the overlying Cistecephalus AZ (CiAZ). Notably, Cistecephalus and Oudenodon first appear in the upper part of the Tropidostoma - Gorgonops Subzone in the EAZ, and Tropidostoma itself lasts into the lowest part of the CiAZ. The upper part of this subzone is dated to 256.8 million years ago. As such, the whole subzone falls within the early to mid-Wuchiapingian.

Like the preceding subzone, the Tropidostoma - Gorgonops Subzone has outcrops along the Nuweveld Escarpment west of Beaufort West. They are around 130–150 metres (430–490 ft) thick here. It also has exposed layers on the lower Nuweveld Mountain slopes. These outcrops are characterized by the predominance of mudrock successions of fluvio-lacustrine strata (layers deposited by rivers and lakes). Most vertebrate fossils are found in thick greenish-grey siltstones with mudstone intercalations between channel sandstones. These layers were deposited by repeated overbank flooding events, as well as ponds in lowland flood basins. Some regions with fine-grained sandstones may have been deposited by highly sinuous meandering rivers. Multiple distinct subenvironments have been identified in the floodplains preserved in the Hoedemaker Member, including channel bank/levee facies, proximal floodbasin/crevasse splay facies, and distal floodbasin/pond facies.

== Palaeontology ==
The Endothiodon Assemblage Zone preserves a diverse biota. While vertebrates are known from the greatest diversity, invertebrates and plants have also been described.

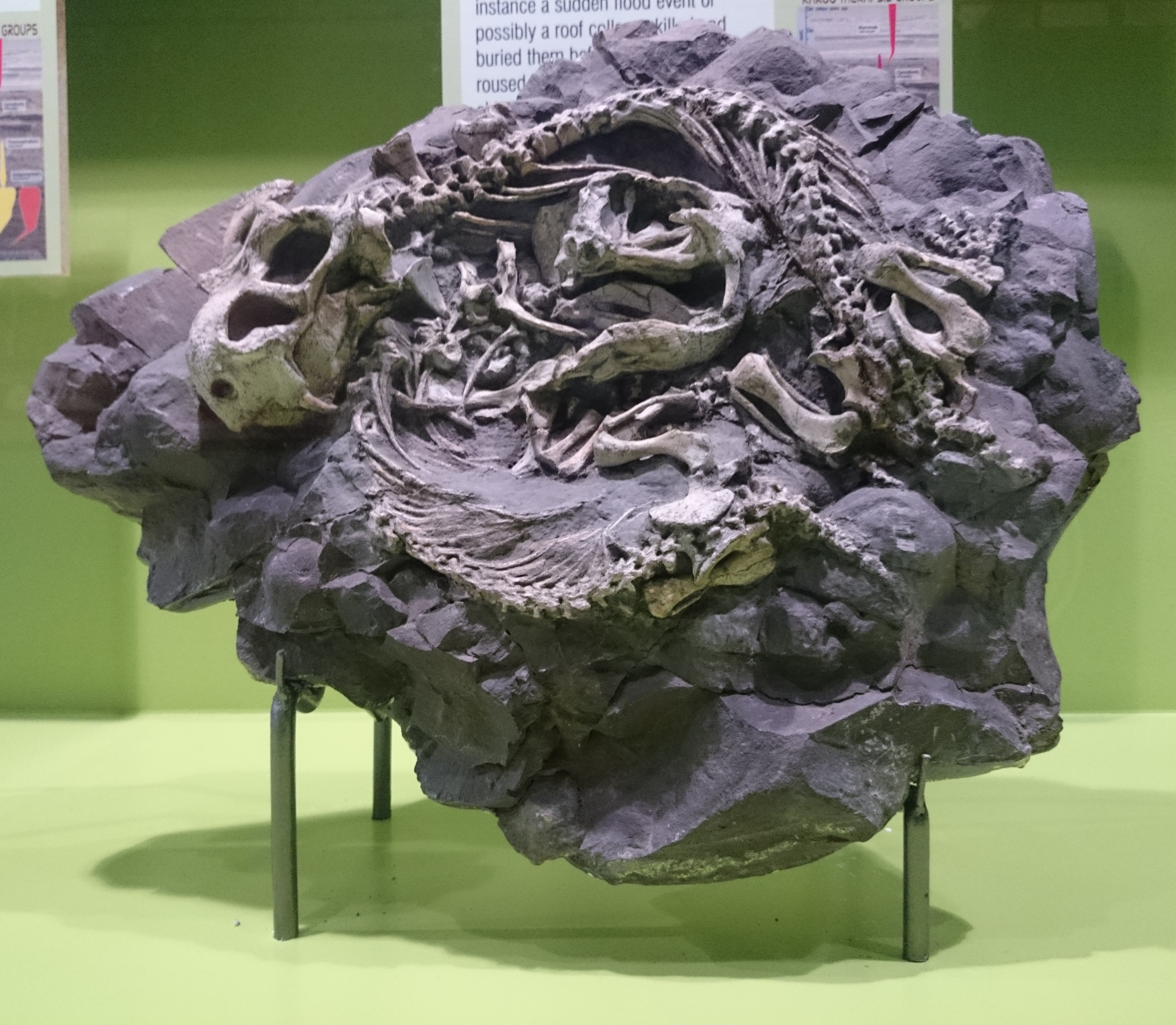
Burrow specimen of two Diictodon individuals

The Lycosuchus - Eunotosaurus Subzone has a fairly low-diversity assemblage, 92% of which is dominated by dicynodonts (75% Diictodon, 14% Pristerodon, 6% Endothiodon, and 3% Emydops). This subzone represents the immediate ecological recovery after the Capitanian mass extinction event. Most large bones in this subzone are not found in articulation, but are complete. They are often eroded. Several sinuous and helical casts of vertebrate burrows have been discovered, and attributed to Diictodon (which is sometimes found inside the burrow). Some specimens, such as articulated skulls and lower jaws of Diictodon and complete, robust rib cages of Eunotosaurus are commonly found in isolation, likely representing the heaviest regions of disarticulated carcasses that are less likely to have been dispersed due to flooding. Besides the most common genera and those that give the subzone its name, other vertebrate taxa include a single biarmosuchian (Lobalopex mordax), anomodontians (including dicynodonts), various gorgonopsians, and other therocephalians.

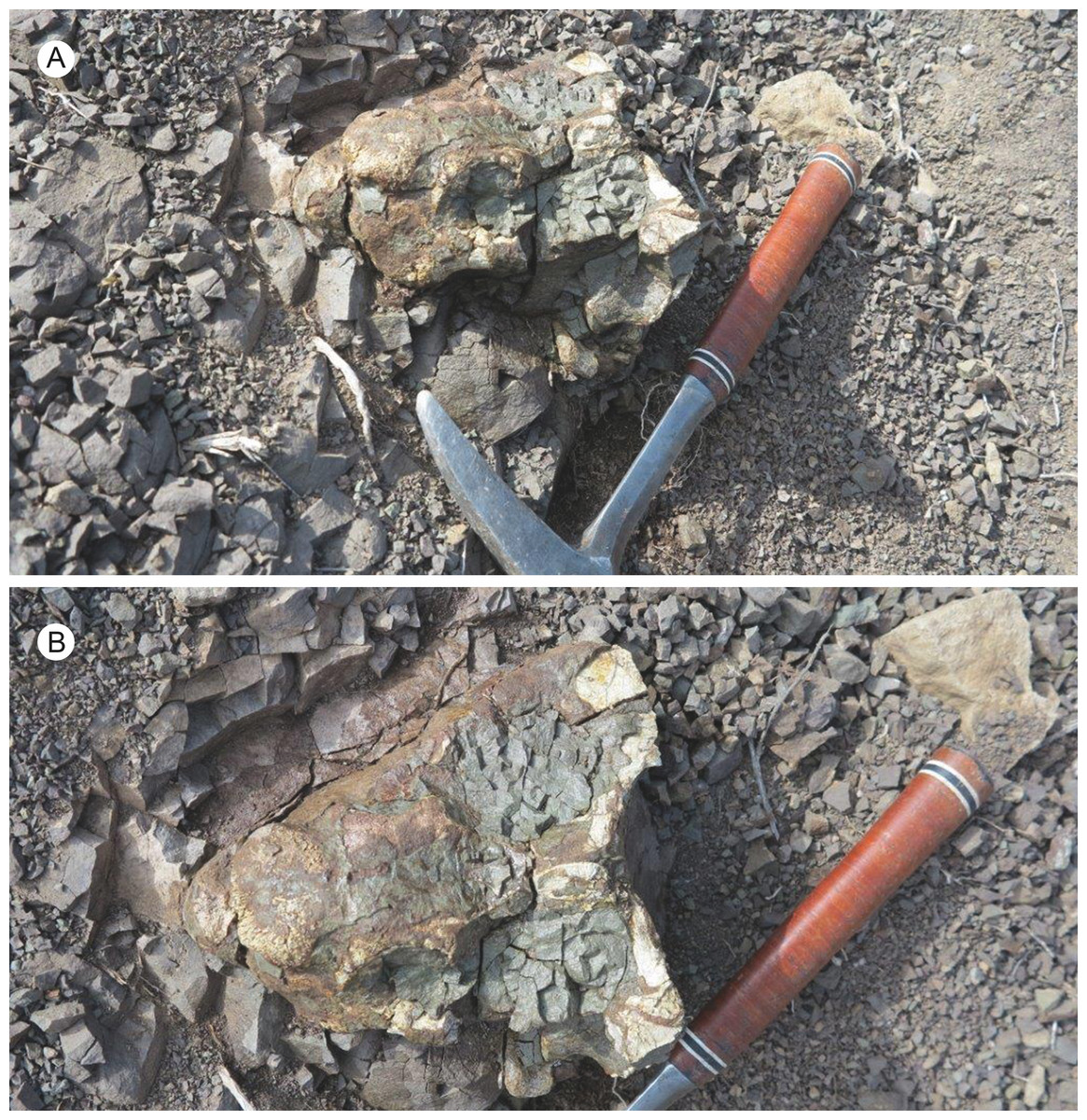
Holtoype skull of the dicynodont Bulbasaurus as found in situ in Driekoppe, an EAZ locality

The Tropidostoma - Gorgonops Subzone has a much more diverse assemblage, with several clades unseen in the underlying subzone. 96% of the taxa are dicynodonts. Specimens found in this subzone are often well-preserved and unweathered. They are most often disarticulated, but there have been multiple discoveries of fully-articulated skeletons, some in aggregations (multiple individuals preserved together). Multiple instances of "Diictodon graveyards" are also known in this subzone, which preserve dense clusters of the skeletons and skulls of this genus in layers of alluvium (loose sediment deposited by running water). These scenarios may be the result of these animals becoming mired or predated at the margin of a distal floodplain lake. Burrows from digging dicynodonts are rare in the subzone's lower section, and have a straight or slightly sinuous morphology; they are not present in the upper section. In regions where Diictodon specimens are abundant, bone-bearing coprolites from therapsids have been found.

=== Palaeobiota ===
The following tables summarize the fauna and flora described from or discovered in the Endothiodon Assemblage Zone (EAZ). Unless otherwise specified, all entries derive from Day & Smith (2020), which listed these species based on reliably identified specimens.

Color key: Lycosuchus - Eunotosaurus Subzone / Tropidostoma - Gorgonops Subzone / Both subzones / Uncertain provenance

==== Synapsids ====
===== Anomadontians =====
Anomodontians of the EAZ
Genus	Species	Subzone	Notes	Images
Bulbasaurus	B. phylloxyron	Tropidostoma - Gorgonops Subzone	A geikiid dicynodont	
Cistecephalus	C. microrhinus	Tropidostoma - Gorgonops Subzone	A cistecephalid dicynodont	
Dicynodontoides	D. recurvidens	Lycosuchus - Eunotosaurus Subzone; Tropidostoma - Gorgonops Subzone	A kingoriid dicynodont	
Diictodon	D. feliceps	Lycosuchus - Eunotosaurus Subzone; Tropidostoma - Gorgonops Subzone	A pylaecephalid dicynodont	
Emydops	E. arctatus	Lycosuchus - Eunotosaurus Subzone; Tropidostoma - Gorgonops Subzone	An emydopid dicynodont	
Endothiodon	E. bathystoma	Lycosuchus - Eunotosaurus Subzone; Tropidostoma - Gorgonops Subzone	An endothiodontid dicynodont	
Oudenodon	O. bainii	Tropidostoma - Gorgonops Subzone	An oudenodontid dicynodont	
Pristerodon	P. mackayi	Lycosuchus - Eunotosaurus Subzone; Tropidostoma - Gorgonops Subzone	A dicynodont	
Rhachiocephalus	R. magnus	Tropidostoma - Gorgonops Subzone	A rhachiocephalid dicynodont	
Tropidostoma	T. dubium	Tropidostoma - Gorgonops Subzone	An oudenodontid dicynodont	

===== Gorgonopsians =====
Gorgonopsians of the EAZ
Genus	Species	Subzone	Notes	Images
Aelurosaurus	A. felinus	Lycosuchus - Eunotosaurus Subzone; Tropidostoma - Gorgonops Subzone	A gorgonopsian	
Aelurognathus	A. tigriceps	Tropidostoma - Gorgonops Subzone	A rubidgeine gorgonopsian	
Arctops	A. willistoni	Tropidostoma - Gorgonops Subzone	A gorgonopsid gorgonopsian	
Cynariops	C. robustus	Tropidostoma - Gorgonops Subzone	A gorgonopsid gorgonopsian	
Eriphostoma	E. microdon	Lycosuchus - Eunotosaurus Subzone	A gorgonopsian	
Gorgonops	G. torvus	Lycosuchus - Eunotosaurus Subzone; Tropidostoma - Gorgonops Subzone	A gorgonopsid gorgonopsian	
Lycaenops	L. ornatus	Tropidostoma - Gorgonops Subzone	A gorgonopsid gorgonopsian	
Smilesaurus	S. ferox	Tropidostoma - Gorgonops Subzone	A gorgonopsid gorgonopsian	

===== Therocephalians =====
Therocephalians of the EAZ
Genus	Species	Subzone	Notes	Images
Alopecognathus	A. angusticeps	Lycosuchus - Eunotosaurus Subzone	A scylacosaurid scylacosaurian; EAZ fossils previously attributed to the related Glanosuchus have since been transferred to this species.	
Hofmeyria	H. atavus	Lycosuchus - Eunotosaurus Subzone; Tropidostoma - Gorgonops Subzone	A hofmeyriid eutherocephalian	
Hyorhynchus	H. platyceps	Lycosuchus - Eunotosaurus Subzone	A scylacosaurid scylacosaurian	
Ictidostoma	I. hemburyi	Lycosuchus - Eunotosaurus Subzone; Tropidostoma - Gorgonops Subzone	A hofmeyriid eutherocephalian	
Ictidosuchoides	I. longiceps	Lycosuchus - Eunotosaurus Subzone; Tropidostoma - Gorgonops Subzone	A ictidosuchid eutherocephalian	
Ictidosuchops	L. rubidgei	Lycosuchus - Eunotosaurus Subzone	A baurioidean eutherocephalian	
Ictidosuchus	I. primaevus	Tropidostoma - Gorgonops Subzone	A baurioidean eutherocephalian	
Lycosuchus	L. vanderrieti	Lycosuchus - Eunotosaurus Subzone	A lycosuchid therocephalian	
Microwhaitsia	M. mendrezi	Tropidostoma - Gorgonops Subzone	A whaitsiid eutherocephalian	
Pristerognathus	P. polyodon	Lycosuchus - Eunotosaurus Subzone	A scylacosaurid scylacosaurian; something of a wastebasket taxon due to the fragmentary nature of its holotype and the poorly-supported referral of several additional specimens to this species.	

===== Biarmosuchians =====
Biarmosuchians of the EAZ
Genus	Species	Subzone	Notes	Images
Burnetiamorpha indet.	Indeterminate	Lycosuchus - Eunotosaurus Subzone	Multiple unnamed burnetiamorphan biarmosuchians	
Leucocephalus	L. wewersi	Tropidostoma - Gorgonops Subzone	A burnetiid burnetiamorphan	
cf. Lemurosaurus	cf. L. sp.	Type locality undescribed	SAM-PK-K1090, a specimen referred to cf. Lemurosaurus (or L. pricei in older works)	
Lobalopex	L. mordax	Lycosuchus - Eunotosaurus Subzone; Tropidostoma - Gorgonops Subzone	A burnetiamorphan	
Lophorhinus	L. willodenensis	Tropidostoma - Gorgonops Subzone	A burnetiamorphan	
Proburnetiinae indet.	Indeterminate	Tropidostoma - Gorgonops Subzone	An unnamed proburnetiine burnetiid	

===== Cynodontians =====
Cynodontians of the EAZ
Genus	Species	Subzone	Notes	Images
Abdalodon	A. diastematicus	Tropidostoma - Gorgonops Subzone	A charassognathid cynodont	
Charassognathus	C. gracilis	Tropidostoma - Gorgonops Subzone	A charassognathid cynodont	

==== Sauropsids ====
Sauropsids of the EAZ
Genus	Species	Subzone	Notes	Images
Eunotosaurus	E. africanus	Lycosuchus - Eunotosaurus Subzone	A derived millerettid, historically regarded by some as a very early pantestudine (turtle ancestor).	
Galesphyrus	G. capensis	Type locality uncertain; constrained to upper Tapinocephalus AZ (Diictodon - Styracocephalus Subzone) to lower Daptocephalus AZ (Dicynodon -Theriognathus Subzone)	A probable non-neodiapsid closely allied with parapleurotans	
Heleophilus	H. acutus	Age of type locality uncertain due to limited fossils and thin rock layers; historically placed within the Tapinocephalus AZ, Endothiodon AZ, or Cistecephalus AZ	A putative millerettid	
Milleropsis	M. pricei	Tropidostoma - Gorgonops Subzone	A millerettid	
Pareiasaurus	P. nasicornis	Tropidostoma - Gorgonops Subzone	A pareiasaur; P. nasicornis and P. peringueyi have alternatively been classified in the genus Pareiasuchus.	
Pareiasaurus	P. peringueyi	Tropidostoma - Gorgonops Subzone	A pareiasaur; P. nasicornis and P. peringueyi have alternatively been classified in the genus Pareiasuchus.	Pareiasuchus peringueyi
Pareiasaurus	P. serridens	Tropidostoma - Gorgonops Subzone	A pareiasaur; P. nasicornis and P. peringueyi have alternatively been classified in the genus Pareiasuchus.	
Scyllacerta	S. creanae	Tropidostoma - Gorgonops Subzone	A younginid; known from a specimen initially assumed to be a juvenile aggregation of the more recent genus Youngina	

==== Captorhinids ====
Captorhinids of the EAZ
Genus	Species	Subzone	Notes	Images
Saurorictus	S. australis	Tropidostoma - Gorgonops Subzone	A captorhinid tetrapod	

==== Temnospondyls ====
Temnospondyls of the EAZ
Genus	Species	Subzone	Notes	Images
Rhinesuchoides	R. capensis	Tropidostoma - Gorgonops Subzone	A rhinesuchid stereospondyl	
Rhinesuchoides	R. tenuiceps	Lycosuchus - Eunotosaurus Subzone; Tropidostoma - Gorgonops Subzone	A rhinesuchid stereospondyl	
Rhinesuchus	R. whaitsi	Lycosuchus - Eunotosaurus Subzone; Tropidostoma - Gorgonops Subzone	A rhinesuchid stereospondyl	

==== Fish ====
Fishes of the EAZ
Genus	Species	Subzone	Notes	Images
Atherstonia	A. scutata	Lycosuchus - Eunotosaurus Subzone; Tropidostoma - Gorgonops Subzone	A palaeoniscid fish	
Namaichthys	N. digitata	Lycosuchus - Eunotosaurus Subzone; Tropidostoma - Gorgonops Subzone	An acrolepidid fish	

==== Invertebrates ====
Invertebrates of the EAZ
Genus	Species	Subzone	Notes	Images
Palaeomutela	P. sp.	Lycosuchus - Eunotosaurus Subzone; Tropidostoma - Gorgonops Subzone	A heteroconchian bivalve	

==== Plants ====
Plants of the EAZ
Genus	Species	Subzone	Notes	Images
Glossopteris	G. sp.	Lycosuchus - Eunotosaurus Subzone; Tropidostoma - Gorgonops Subzone	A seed plant in the order Glossopteridales	Sample from the Upper Permian Sydney Basin of Australia
Schizoneura	S. sp.	Lycosuchus - Eunotosaurus Subzone; Tropidostoma - Gorgonops Subzone	A horsetail in the order Equisetales	Sample from the Triassic Vosges mountains of France

=== Trace fossils ===
Vertebrate and invertebrate trace fossils have been identified in the Endothiodon Assemblage Zone. In both subzones, bone-bearing coprolites and sinuous vertebrate burrow casts have been found, as well as footprints of the ichnospecies Dolomitipes icelsi, representing tracks of large dicynodonts. Diamonelix helical burrows and the ichnotaxa Karoopes gansfonteinenesis (gorgonopsid tracks) and cf. Capitosauroides (therocephalian tracks) are known only from the Lycosuchus - Eunotosaurus Subzone. Invertebrate trace fossils in both subzones comprise the ichnogenera Diplichnites (two parallel rows of arthropod tracks), Planolites (worm-like feeding traces), Skolithos (vertical cylindrical burrow), and Undichna (fin trail).
