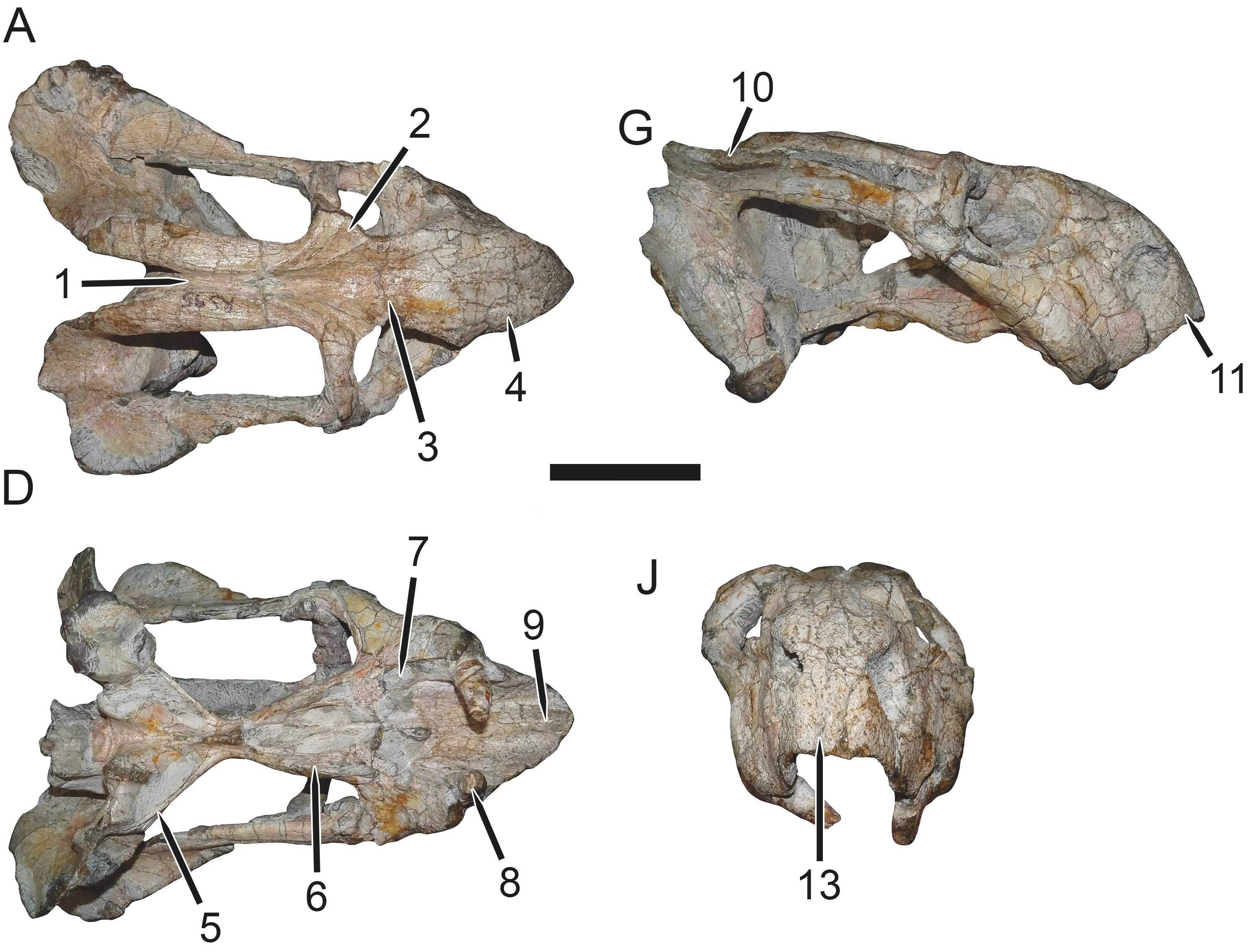
- Tropidostoma dubium (SAM-PK-K11238) in (A) dorsal, (D) ventral, (G) right lateral, and (J) anterior views. Bulbasaurus phylloxyron (CGP/1/938) in (B) dorsal, (E) ventral, (H) right lateral, and (K) anterior views. Specimen has suffered some lateral compression. Scale bars equal 5 cm.

Scientific classification
- Kingdom: Animalia
- Phylum: Chordata
- Clade: Synapsida
- Clade: Therapsida
- Clade: †Anomodontia
- Clade: †Dicynodontia
- Family: †Oudenodontidae
- Genus: †Tropidostoma; Owen, 1876
- Species: †T. dubium

Binomial name
- †Tropidostoma dubium Seeley, 1876

Synonyms
- Cteniosaurus platyceps; Dicynodon acutirostris; Dicynodon cavifrons; Dicynodon dunnii; Dicynodon rogersi; Dicynodon validus; Tropidostoma microtrema

= Tropidostoma =

Tropidostoma Temporal range: Late Permian, Lopingian ~260–258 Ma

Extinct genus of dicynodonts

Tropidostoma is a medium-sized herbivorous oudenodontid dicynodont therapsid that lived during the Late Permian (Lopingian) period in South Africa. The first Tropidostoma fossil was described by Harry Govier Seeley in 1889. Later two subspecies were identified. Tropidostoma fossils are an index fossil in a biozone of the Karoo Basin known as the Tropidostoma Assemblage Zone. This biozone is characterized by the presence of this species in association with another dicynodont species, Endothiodon uniseries.

== History of discovery ==
The first Tropidostoma fossil material was found during a field expedition in the Upper Permian-aged Teekloof Formation of the Beaufort Group. This material was later described by Seeley (1889) in a study in which he described two fossils which had been named Dicynodon microtrema and Tropidostoma dunni. In 1915, several years after Seeley's death, the paleontologist, Robert Broom, reexamined the same material and discovered that the fossil material in question was of the same species. This new single species was renamed Tropidostoma microtrema. Some years later, the name T. microtrema was changed to Tropidostoma dubium, and Tropidostoma dunni is now considered to be the type species.

== Description ==
Two species exist among the specimens referred to as Tropidostoma dubium and Tropidostoma dunni . T. dubium is observed to have two cranial morphs, one being robust form with a tall snout and large tusks and the other more gracile with a low snout and small or no tusks. The robust and gracile forms are considered to either represent sexual dimorphism or individual variation.

== Classification ==
Tropidostoma is currently classified as an oudenodontid within the larger dicynodont clade Bidentalia. This clade is characterized collectively by their reduced dentition with only their maxillary tusks being intact. However, many species in this clade sporadically lack tusks completely and their fossils only hold evidence that they retained their keratinous beaks. Many Tropidostoma fossils previously collected have been misidentified as other species, such as of Oudenodon bainii due to their remarkable similarity. In addition, the type fossil of the recently discovered Bulbasaurus phylloxyron was misidentified as a Tropidostoma fossil for several years.

== See also ==
- List of therapsids
