= Tapinocephalus Assemblage Zone =

Permian biozone in South Africa

- Stratigraphic range: Capitanian ~264.4–260 Ma
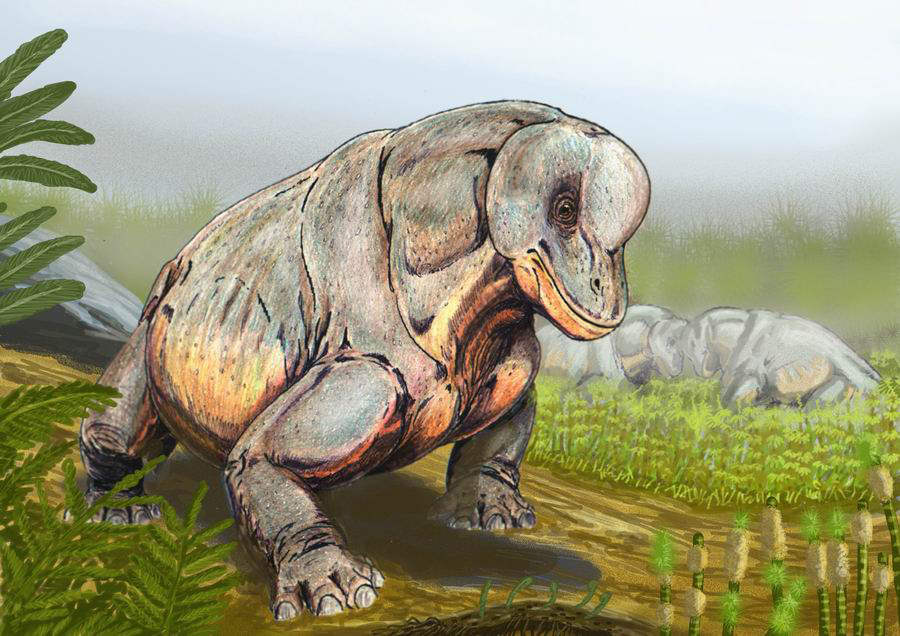
- Tapinocephalus atherstonei
- Type: Biozone
- Unit of: Abrahamskraal Formation of the Beaufort Group
- Underlies: Endothiodon Assemblage Zone
- Overlies: Eodicynodon Assemblage Zone
- Thickness: up to 6,561.68 feet (2,000 m)

Location
- Region: Northern, Western & Eastern Cape
- Country: South Africa
- Extent: Karoo Basin

Type section
- Named for: Tapinocephalus atherstonei
- Named by: Watson (1914), Keyser & Smith (1977-78), Kitching (1984)

The Tapinocephalus Assemblage Zone is a tetrapod assemblage zone or biozone in the Karoo Supergroup in South Africa, which correlates to the middle Abrahamskraal Formation. It dates to the Capitanian stage of the Middle Permian, around 264.4-260 million years ago. It is part of the Adelaide Subgroup of the Beaufort Group, a fossiliferous and geologically important geological group of the Karoo Sequence. The thickest outcrops, reaching approximately 2,000 metres (6,600 ft), occur from Merweville and Leeu-Gamka in its southernmost exposures, from Sutherland through to Beaufort West where outcrops start to only be found in the south-east, north of Oudshoorn and Willowmore, reaching up to areas south of Graaff-Reinet. Its northernmost exposures occur around the towns Fraserburg and Victoria West. The Tapinocephalus Assemblage Zone is the second biozone of the Beaufort Group.

The name of the biozone refers to Tapinocephalus atherstonei, a large herbivorous tapinocephalid dinocephalian therapsid. It is characterised by the presence of this dinocephalian species along with the appearance of other advanced tapinocephalid dinocephalians, and the large pareiasaur Bradysaurus baini. It is also the first biozone of the series where the dicynodont, Diictodon feliceps, species first appear.

== History ==
The first fossils to be found in the Beaufort Group rocks that encompass the current eight biozones were discovered by Andrew Geddes Bain in 1856. However, it was not until 1892 that it was observed that the geological strata of the Beaufort Group could be differentiated based on their fossil taxa. The initial undertaking was done by Harry Govier Seeley who subdivided the Beaufort Group into three biozones, which he named (from oldest to youngest):

- Zone of "Pareiasaurians"
- Zone of "Dicynodonts"
- Zone of "highly specialized group of theriodonts"

These proposed biozones Seeley named were subdivided further by Robert Broom between 1906 and 1909. Broom proposed the following biozones (from oldest to youngest):

- Pareiasaurus beds
- Endothiodon beds
- Kistecephalus beds
- Lystrosaurus beds
- Procolophon beds
- Cynognathus beds

The rocks of the current Tapinocephalus Assemblage Zone were first included with those of the lower Eodicynodon Assemblage Zone under the name "Pareiasaurus beds" by Broom. Years later Lieuwe Dirk Boonstra redefined the boundaries of the Tapinocephalus Assemblage Zone. As a young man Boonstra collaborated with Broom on research of dinocephalians. After embarking on further study of dinocephalian fossils and their biostratigraphy, Boonstra defined the lower, middle, and upper sections of this biozone. In the 1970s, Keyser and Smith proposed the renaming of the biozone to Dinocephalian Assemblage Zone. In 1984 James Kitching proposed to name the biozone after Tapinocephalus, which was accepted over Keyser and Smith's proposal. However, the zoning of the biozone rocks remains as they were defined by Keyser and Smith.

== Lithology ==
The Tapinocephalus Assemblage Zone correlates with the Abrahamskraal Formation, Adelaide Subgroup of the Beaufort Group. Outcrops of this biozone are known from the south-western and central margins of the Abrahamskraal Formation where it conformably overlies the Eodicynodon Assemblage Zone in its south-western localities. In its northern and eastern localities it inter-fingers with Ecca Group-aged deposits. This biozone is considered to be Middle Permian (Guadalupian) in age.

The rocks of the Tapinocephalus Assemblage Zone consist mainly of maroon to greyish red or purple mudstone layers which exhibit blocky weathering at exposed outcrops. The mudstones contain calcareous nodules and sheet limestones, both are indicative of a warm and seasonally arid climate, revealing the presence of paleocalcretes and carbonate precipitation respectively in playa lakes. Paleosols are also commonly found in the mudstones, which indicates a lack of deposition for long periods of time. In some deposits the mudstone layers contain thin chert lenses which have been attributed to silicified tuff deposits. Alternating beds of light grey to dark greenish grey siltstone and greenish grey to light olive grey sandstones which weather to light orange grey. The siltstones frequently contain both symmetrical and asymmetrical ripple surfaces which indicate that paleocurrents traveled downstream in a northerly direction. Desiccation cracks which are infilled by fine sandstone are also found. The sandstones are fine-grained and mainly tabular, indicating that deposition of these sandstones was in a low-energy fluvial environment. The sandstones are capped in the upper sections of the biozone with mudstone clast conglomerates.

The depositional environment of the Tapinocephalus Assemblage Zone was formed by sedimentary material being deposited in the Karoo Basin (a retro-arc foreland basin) by vast, low-energy alluvial plains flowing northwards from a southerly source area in the rising Gondwanide mountains. The Gondwanides were the result of crustal uplift that had previously begun to take course due to subduction of the Palaeo-pacific plate beneath the Gondwanan Plate. Orogenic pulses from the growing Gondwanides mountain chain and associated subduction created accommodation space for sedimentation in the Karoo Basin where the deposits of the Tapinocephalus Assemblage zone, and all other succeeding assemblage zone deposits, were deposited over millions of years.

== Paleontology ==
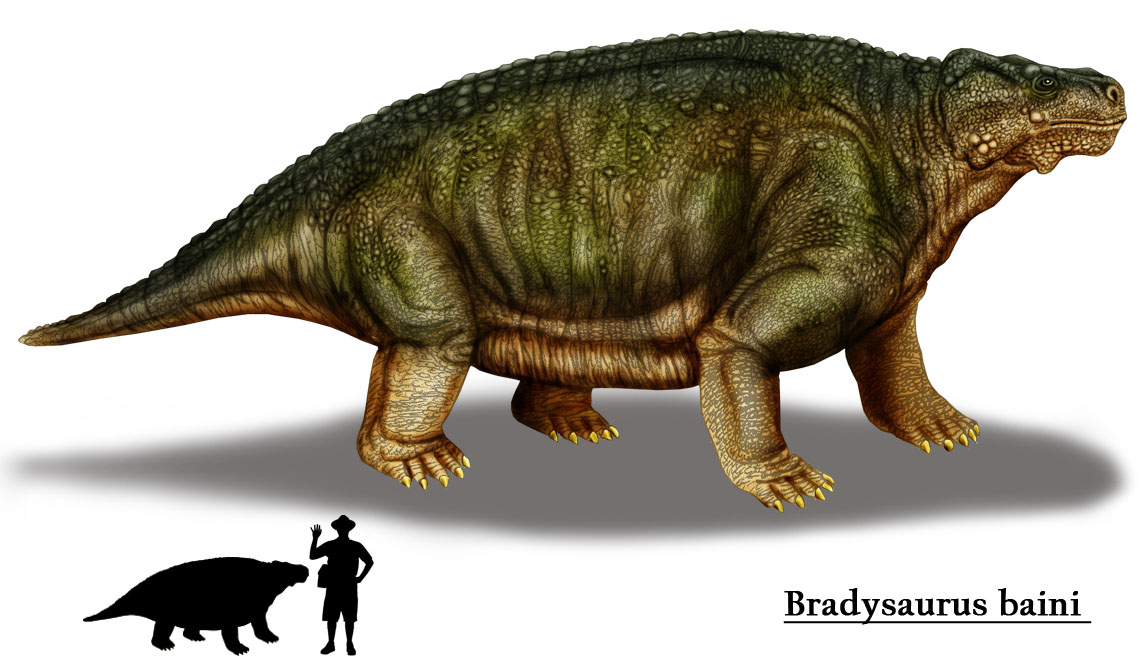
Bradysaurus baini

The Tapinocephalus Assemblage Zone is characterized by the presence of Tapinocephalus atherstonei and Bradysaurus baini. Vertebrate fossils found in this biozone are not especially common, however are most commonly discovered as articulated single specimens within or associated with the calcareous nodules in the mudstone layers. As the name for this biozone suggests, it is renowned by paleontologists for its diverse Dinocephalian fossil species where almost all members of this family – the Anteosauridae, Titanosuchidae, and Tapinocephalidae – are represented. Example species from these families are Anteosaurus magnificus, Jonkeria boonstrai, and Tapinocephalus atherstonei respectively. Other notable dinocephalian species which have been discovered from this biozone are the advanced tapinocephalids Struthiocephalus whaitsi and Moschops capensis, and the unusual Styracocephalus platyrhynchus. Unfortunately dinocephalian fossils are frequently found disarticulated with much of their postcrania missing.

Despite the rarity of fossils, the fossil taxa that have been found from the Tapinocephalus Assemblage Zone are extremely diverse. Parareptile species such as the pareiasaur, Bradysaurus, and the perplexing putative pantestudine Eunotosaurus africanus are confined to this biozone. One of the few pelycosaur species found in South African deposits, Elliotsmithia longiceps, and the biarmosuchian Hipposaurus boonstrai are likewise found, including a variety of basal gorgonopsid, anomodont, and therocephalian species. The dicynodont Diictodon feliceps first appeared in this biozone and remained ubiquitous until the Permian-Triassic boundary. Other dicynodont species found include Robertia broomiana and Pristerodon brachyops. Finally, fossils of temnospondyl amphibians such as Rhinesuchoides tenuiceps, remains of the fish Namaichthys digitata, invertebrate fossils of molluscs, invertebrate trackways and burrows, vertebrate footprints of therapsids, and a variety of plant fossils, namely of Glossopteris, Dadoxylon, and Schizoneura, have been recovered.

== Correlation ==
Many dinocephalian species that are found in the Tapinochephalus Assemblage Zone have been found in formations in different countries which correlate in age. As dinocephalian fossils are only known from Middle Permian (Guadalupian) deposits, dinocephalians are good biostratigraphic markers for this period. Dinocephalian fossils, along with other therapsid species found in the Tapinocephalus Assemblage Zone, have been recovered from the Rio do Rasto Formation from the Paraná Basin in Brazil and from the Madumabisa Mudstone in Zambia.

== See also ==
- List of synapsids
