= Biochronology =

Method of relating biologic events to the geologic timescale using fossils

In paleontology, biochronology is the correlation in time of biological events using fossils. In its strict sense, it refers to the use of assemblages of fossils that are not tied to stratigraphic sections (in contrast to biostratigraphy, where they are). Collections of land mammal ages have been defined for every continent except Antarctica, and most are correlated with each other indirectly through known evolutionary lineages. A combination of argon–argon dating and magnetic stratigraphy allows a direct temporal comparison of terrestrial events with climate variations and mass extinctions.

== Comparison with biostratigraphy ==
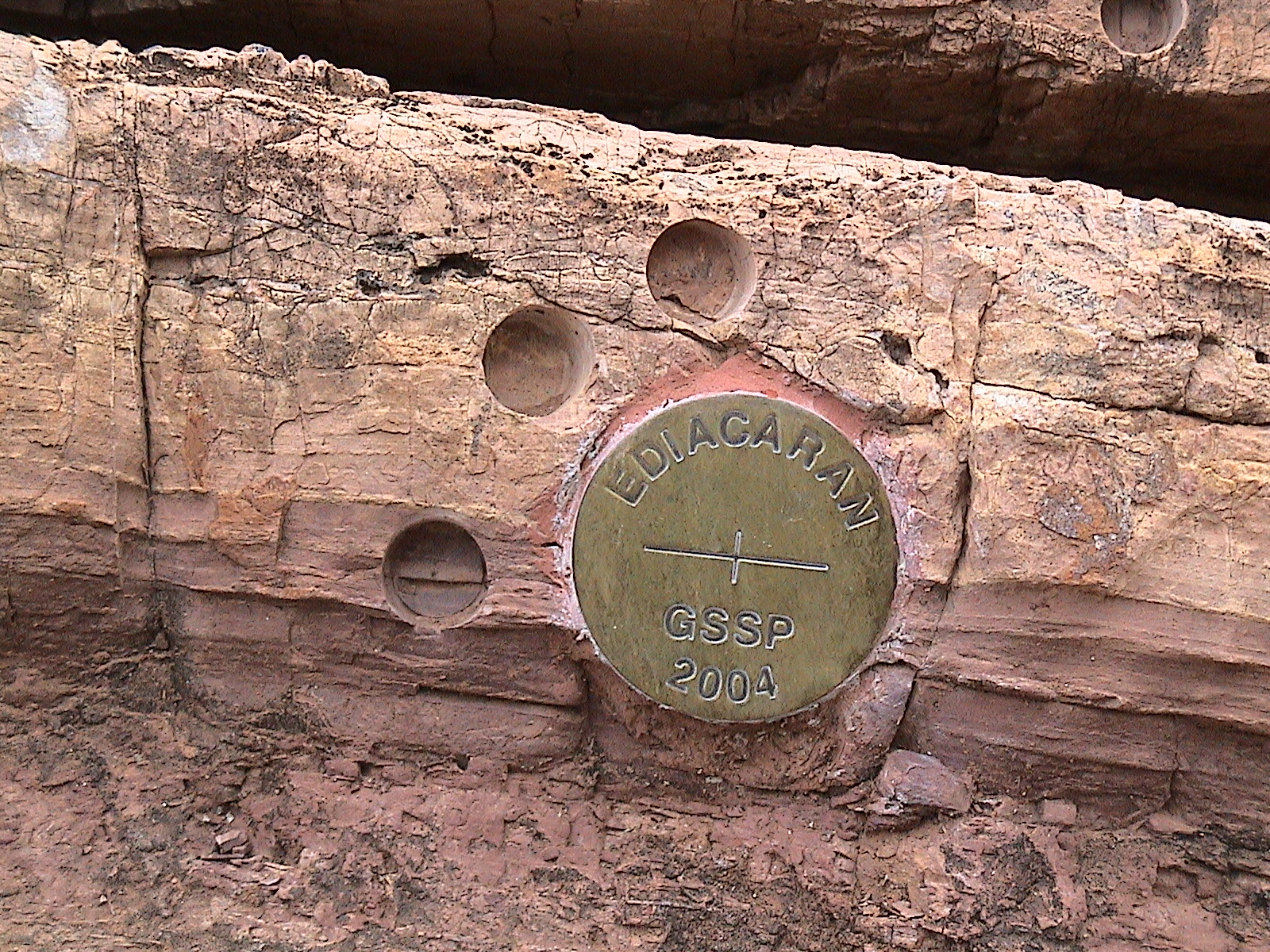
A golden spike marking the bottom of the Ediacaran period, an example of an internationally agreed upon reference point for this boundary.

In sedimentary rocks, fossils are the only widely applicable tool for time correlation. Evolution leaves a record of change, sequential and nonrepeating. A rock unit has a characteristic assemblage of fossils, independent of its lithology. Thus, the fossils can be used to compare the ages of different rock units.

The basic unit of biochronology is the biostratigraphic zone, or biozone, a collection of fossils found together in a rock unit. This is used as the basis of a biochron, "a unit of time in which an association of taxa is interpreted to have lived." However, a biozone may vary in age from one location or another. For example, a given taxon may migrate, so its first appearance varies from place to place. In particular, facies-controlled organisms (organisms that lived in a particular sedimentary environment) are not well suited for biochronology because they move with their environment and may change little over long periods of time. Thus, biostratigraphers search for species that are particularly widespread, abundant, and not tied to particular sedimentary environments. This is particularly true of free-swimming animals such as benthic foraminifera, which readily spread throughout the world's oceans.

Another challenge for stratigraphy is that there are often large gaps in the fossil record at a given location. To counter this, biostratigraphers search for a particularly well-preserved section that can be used as the type section for a particular biostratographic unit. As an example, the boundary between the Silurian and Devonian periods is marked by the first appearance of the graptolite Mongraptus uniformus uniformus in a section in Klonk, Czech Republic.

In terrestrial deposits, fossils of land mammals and other vertebrates are used as stratigraphic tools, but they have some disadvantages relative to marine fossils. They are seldom evenly distributed through a section, and they tend to occur in isolated pockets with few overlaps between biozones. Thus, correlations between biozones is often indirect, inferred using a knowledge of their sequence of evolution. This practice was first proposed by H. S. Williams in 1941.

In the United States, biochronology is widely used as a synonym for biostratigraphy, but in Canada and Europe the term is reserved for biochronology that is not tied to a particular stratigraphic section. This form of biochronology is not recognized by the International Stratigraphic Guide, but it is "really what a great many paleontologists and stratigraphers are after ... an optimum network of fossil correlations, thought to embody a reliable and high-resolution isochronous time (lines) framework."

== Land mammal ages ==
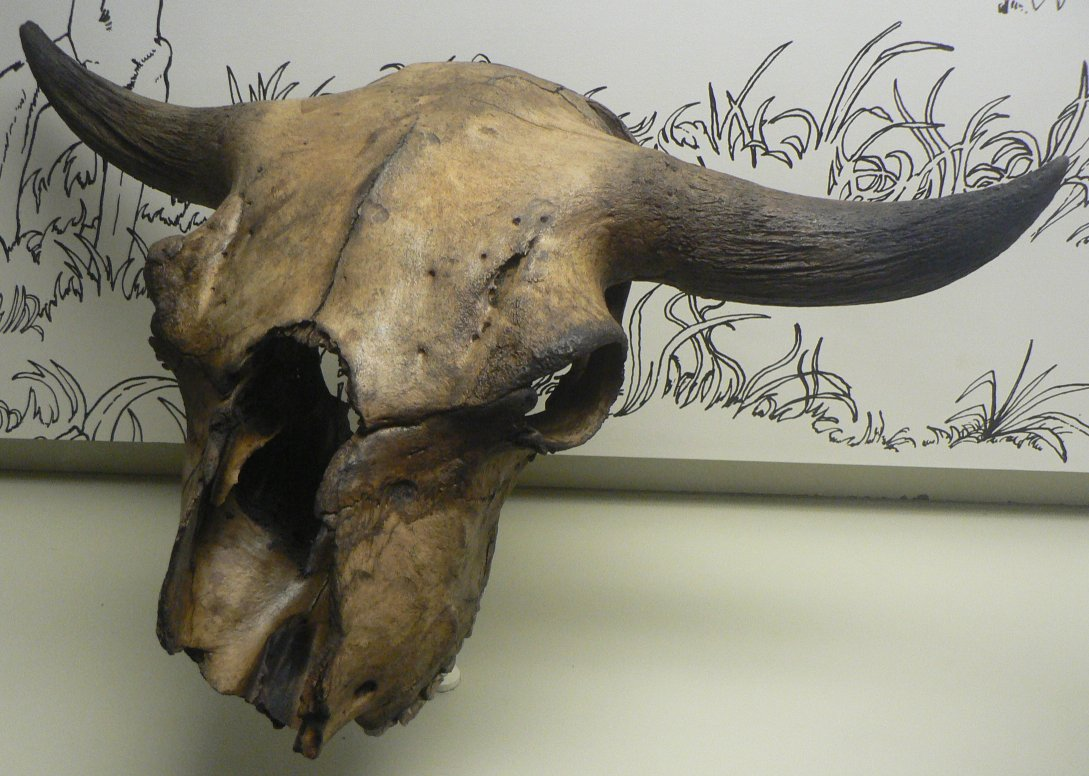
Skull of Bison antiquus from the La Brea Tar Pits.

A Cenozoic chronology based on mammal taxa has been defined on all the continents except Antarctica. Because the continents have been separated through most of the Cenozoic, each continent has its own system. Most of the units are based on assemblage zones, layers of strata that contain three or more distinctive fossils.

=== North America ===
In 1941, a committee chaired by Horace E. Wood II compiled a list of 19 "provincial ages" for North America, later called North American Land Mammal Ages (NMLAs). An example of an NMLA is the Rancholabrean, named after the Rancho La Brea fossil site. One of its characteristic fossils is the bison, which first appears in the Rancholabrean. The committee tried to make the definitions unambiguous by providing multiple criteria such as index fossils, first and last occurrences, and the relation to a particular formation. Some of these criteria have turned out to be inconsistent, leading to conflict. For example, the Chadronian Land Mammal Age in the late Eocene was defined by the boundaries of the Chadron Formation in Nebraska as well as the co-occurrence of Mesohippus, an early horse, and titanotheres, a family of rhinoceros-like animals. Titanotheres have since been found above the Chadron Formation, leaving the definition of the age uncertain. Since NAMLs are not tied to stratigraphic sections, they are not true chronostratigraphic stages, so some authors place quotes around "Ages".

=== South America ===
The development of South American land mammal ages is largely due to two brothers, Florentino Ameghino and Carlos Ameghino. As of 1983, there were 19 ages, all but one of which were based on sections in Argentina. Since then three more ages have been added for the Paleocene.

=== Europe ===
The first European European land mammal age (ELMA), the Villafranchian, was defined in 1865. It was based on sedimentary units near Villafranca d'Asti in Italy. Several more were proposed between 1950 and 1975; and in 1975 Mein introduced a finer division called Mammal Neogene (MN) zones. A total of 30 Mammal Paleogene zones have also been defined.

=== Asia ===
Asian land mammal ages are more recently named and more tentative than the ages for the above continents, with poor geochronological constraints. There is no consensus for the names of some of the ages. However, the picture is rapidly improving, since Central Asia has some of the world's best records of Neogene mammals.

=== Africa ===
African land mammal ages were formally defined in 2020. Previously, sequences of fossils (including those of primates) were only informally designated.

== Other tetrapod-based biochronologies ==
Land-mammal ages mostly represent intervals in the Cenozoic; they have not been proposed for the Mesozoic. However, related systems have been proposed for other periods of prehistory. Land-vertebrate "ages" (LVAs) based primarily on dinosaur faunas have been proposed for the late Cretaceous in western North America.

=== Land vertebrate faunachrons ===
The most widely utilized pre-Cenozoic tetrapod biochronology system involves Land vertebrate faunachrons (LVFs). The LVF system was originally designed by Spencer G. Lucas to correlate terrestrial faunal assemblages of the Triassic period. LVFs have also been used in Permian biochronology. Although LVFs are a common method used to date Triassic terrestrial sediments, their reliability is more heavily debated than that of Land Mammal Ages.

== Geochronology ==
The order of evolutionary events that have been used to sequence land mammal records have been verified using geochronological methods. Although first and last occurrences of taxa can vary with location, assemblages show little variation. Fossils of mammals also have the advantage that the mammals have evolved rapidly.

The resolution of terrestrial fossil records have improved as the methods have improved. Although K–Ar dating has largely yielded correct results, some needed revision after the advent of Argon–argon dating. Magnetic stratigraphy allows synchronization with the global magnetic polarity record resulting from reversals of the Earth's magnetic field. This has made it possible to correlate terrestrial sediments with the time scale from marine sediments, and compare them directly with global climate change and mass extinctions.

Paleontologists have moved towards finer zonation of terrestrial fossils, with the potential to divide the Cenozoic into time intervals of 300,000 years or less. They have also attempted to convert some of the intervals, including the Wasatchian age/stage and Clarkforkian age/stage, into biostratigraphic units. However, the fossil record remains discontinuous even in North America, and Woodburne speculates that "mammal age correlations provide results that are satisfactory to their users."
