= Abdalodon =

Abdalodon Temporal range: Wuchiapingian ~259–254 Ma
- Reconstruction of Abdalodon diastematicus

Scientific classification
- Kingdom: Animalia
- Phylum: Chordata
- Clade: Synapsida
- Clade: Therapsida
- Clade: Cynodontia
- Family: †Charassognathidae
- Subfamily: †Abdalodontinae
- Genus: †Abdalodon; Kammerer, 2016

Type species
- Abdalodon diastematicus Kammerer, 2016

Extinct genus of cynodonts

Abdalodon is an extinct genus of late Permian cynodonts, known by its only species A. diastematicus. Abdalodon, along with the genus Charassognathus, belongs to the clade Charassognathidae. This clade represents the earliest-known cynodonts, and is the first known radiation of this group during the Permian.

Abdalodon diastematicus is known from one crushed fossil skull from the Karoo Basin of South Africa. Of all Permian therapsids, cynodonts are among the rarest representatives, with biarmosuchians being the only therapsid group of comparable rarity. The fossil record of Permian cynodonts is characterized by a long ghost lineage. Abdalodon has been important for discerning the early evolution of the group. This genus and its sister taxon Charassognathus are both small therapsids, with the former having a skull around 6 centimetres (2.4 in) in length and the latter being slightly smaller. This suggests that early cynodont evolution occurred at small body sizes, which could explain the rarity of these fossils from the Permian: this is due to an inherent taphonomic bias against the fossilization of small-bodied animals.

== Etymology ==
The genus name Abdalodon means "Abdala's tooth". The genus was named for paleontologist Fernando Abdala who has made significant contributions to understanding the evolution of the earliest cynodonts. The species epithet diastematicus refers to the characteristic tooth-free gap between the canines and postcanines on both the upper and lower jaw.

== Geology and paleoenvironment ==
Abdalodon was discovered in rocks from the Beaufort Group of the Karoo Basin of South Africa. During the Permian, South Africa made up the southern edge of the supercontinent of Gondwana. Today, the climate of the Karoo Basin is hot and dry, but during the Carboniferous it was cool and semi-arid. The Karoo Basin was situated between the Ecca shallow sea to the north, and the enormous Cape Fold Mountain belt to the south. Flowing from the mountains into the shallow sea was a series of Mississippi-size rivers, carrying with them huge amounts of sediments. By the late Permian these sediments filled the shallow sea, leaving behind the Ecca Group. The resulting landscape was an extensive series of floodplains. These flood plains progressed farther northward during the late Permian and Triassic. The sediments deposited in these floodplains would become the Beaufort Group. Since the Late Carboniferous, the climate had warmed dramatically, and grew wetter. The environment now supported a diverse array of flora and fauna. These floodplains were inhabited by the earliest reptiles and synapsids. By the Late Permian, they had become home to the earliest cynodonts, including Abdalodon.

== Discovery ==
The only known existing Abdalodon specimen (a single skull), was originally described as a juvenile specimen of Procynosuchus delaharpeae in 2008. Any variation between this skull and other existing Procynosuchus delaharpeae specimens was explained as ontogenetic variation. Classifying the skull as P. delaharpeae extended the stratigraphic range of Procynosuchus a few million years earlier into the Permian. However, this result was questioned on the premise that the intermediate strata between, containing known Procynosuchus delaharpe specimens, and the formation in which this skull had been discovered, were well sampled and have not yielded any Procynosuchus delaharpeae specimens. The skull was re-examined, and it was concluded that the organism whence it came from was fully grown. This meant features previously explained as ontogenetic variation, were in fact unique characters, and that the skull actually belonged to a new genus of early cynodonts which was subsequently named Abdalodon.

== Description ==
=== Skull ===
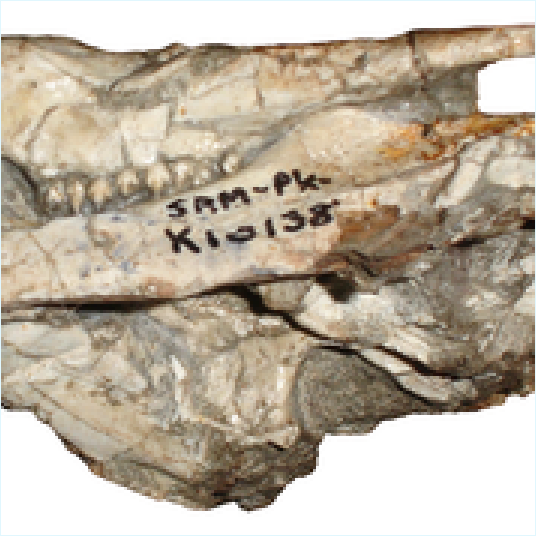
Skull of Abdalodon In left lateral view. Photo courtesy of Christian Kammerer.

The only existing specimen for Abdalodon is an incomplete, dorsoventrally crushed skull, In which the lower jaws are tightly occluded to the palate.

Abdalodon diastematicus is characterized by the presence of diastema between the canines and postcanines of the dentary, and on the maxilla, an even longer diastema between the canines and postcanines. The maxilla has an indentation behind the canine root, and in the same area possess several large foramina. These suggest that Abdalodon may have had whiskers. The posterior end of the maxilla bends medially, insetting the postcanines from the labial border of the snout. The dentary of Abdalodon diastematicus has a well defined masseteric fossa (a synapomorphy of cynodonts). It sits high on the coronoid process, and is where the masseter muscle would have attached to the dentary. The postdentary bones, which are of particular importance since they form the ear bones in mammals, are absent or severely damaged. The nasal bone is relatively flat, and is separated from the maxilla at the anterior end of the snout by the septomaxilla (a therapsid synapomorphy). The lacrimal bone is smaller and narrower than is typical for early cynodonts. Additionally the skull has a significantly broader interorbital region, a shorter temporal region, and a broader snout than either of its closest known relatives: Charassognathus gracilis and Procynosuchus delaharpe. This gives the skull stout appearance comparatively. The dorsal side of the orbital margin is formed entirely by the prefrontal and postorbital bones. The zygomatic arch is nearly entirely formed from the jugal bone, which also makes up part of the postorbital bar.

The anterior region palatal surface of the skull is obscured by the lower jaw, which tightly fixed to the palate. The transverse processes of the pterygoid sweep laterally and posteriorly. When first described the skull was considered to have a triangular interpterygoid vacuity, however upon later examination, the status of a pterygoid vacuity was left ambiguous. The dentary symphysis is covered with foramina, suggesting there may have been whiskers there. The dentary symphysis is tall and sharply angled forming a distinct chin.

=== Dentition ===
The 8 upper postcanines on Abdalodon diastematicus are tricuspid, with a large minimally curved main cusp, and two smaller accessory cusps. The accessory cusps are nearly symmetrical and sit anterior and posterior to the main cusp. The roots of the postcanines are thecodont, meaning that the teeth sit in sockets in the middle of the jaw. Four upper incisors are present on both sides of the skull, with the most posterior incisor being separated from the canine by short diastema. There is a tip of a new incisor emerging at the base of incisor number 4, on the left side of the jaw. It has been suggested that this was a fifth incisor, however, due to its position immediately under incisor 4, it is most likely a replacement tooth. The incisors are conical smooth teeth with no serrations. The canines, like the incisors, are smooth and conical, and are proportionally to the size of the skull, larger than those seen in Procynosuchus delaharpae or Charassognathus gracilis.

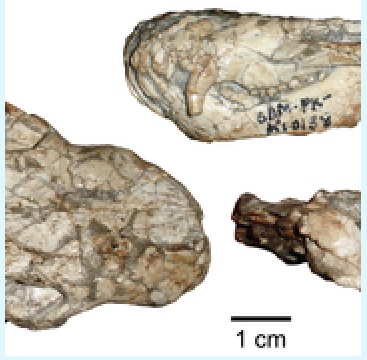
Skull of Abdalodon in several different views. Photo courtesy of Christian Kammerer.

The dentition of Abdalodon has played a critical role in distinguishing it from Procynosuchus. There are three incisors on the lower jaw of Abdalodon, and the lower incisor count is not known to vary ontogenically in any early cynodont, helping to distinguish the genus from Procynosuchus which has four. The eight postcanines of Abdalodon are also outside of the range of ontengenic variation for Procynosuchus, which typically has nine to eleven postcanines. The long diastema between the canine and the postcanines, in both the upper and lower jaw, is unique to Abdalodon. The main cusp of Abdalodon's postcanines is straighter than those of other early cynodonts. Abdalodon's accessory cusps are proportionally larger when compared to the main cusp than in other early cynodonts. The dentition of Abdalodon helps distinguish it from Procynosuchus, the genus to which it was originally attributed. Charassognathus however bears a similar dental formula to Abdalodon, which has been the basis behind grouping them into the clade Charassognathidae. Charrasognathus, however, lacks the substantial maxillary and dentary diastema found on Abdalodon, as well as the masseteric fossa, which distinguishes the two.

== Classification ==
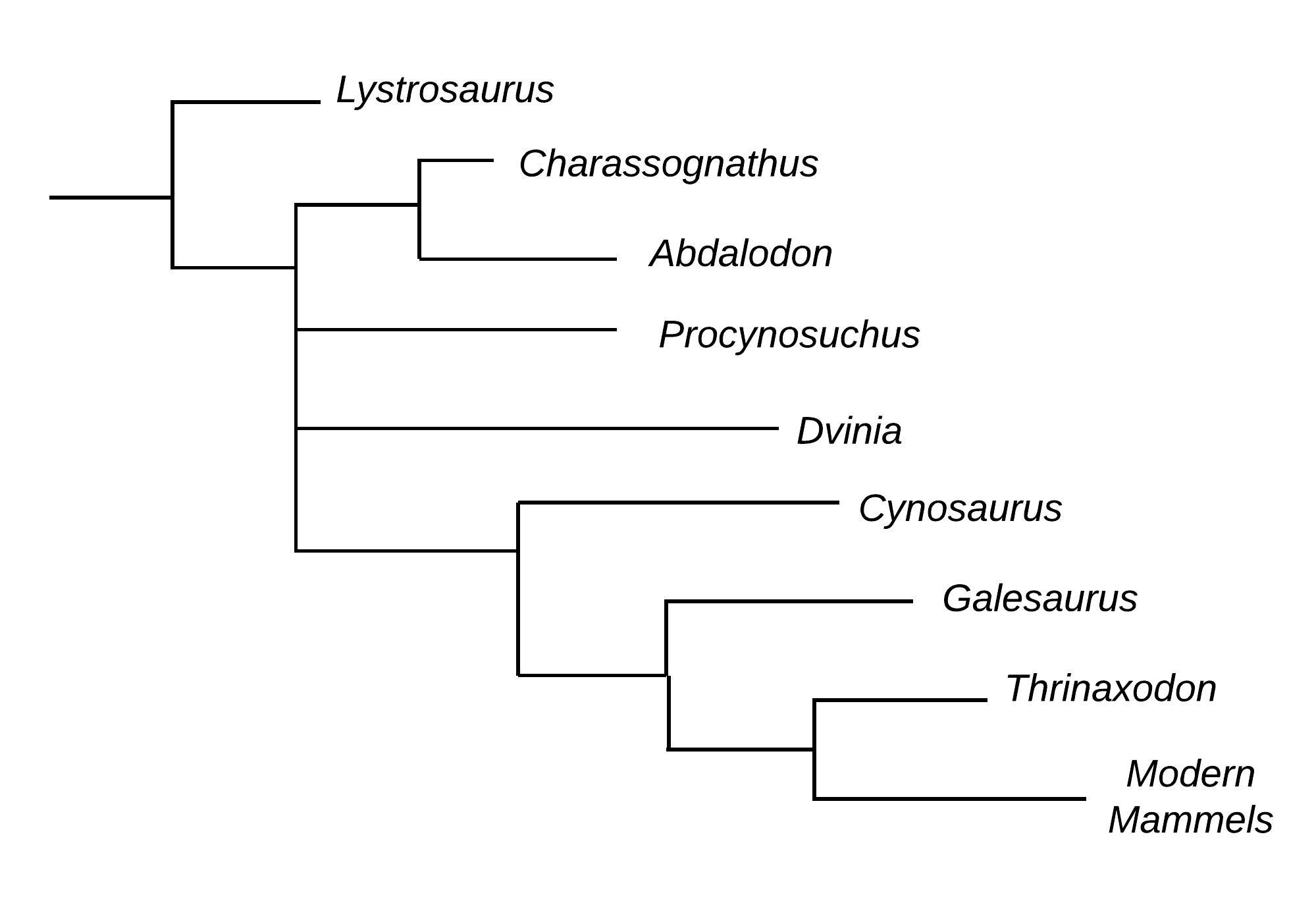
Early cynodont relations

Abdalodon belongs to clade Charassognathidae, a subclade nested within Cynodontia. Cynodontia are most notable for having given rise to the clade Mammalia. Cynodontia belongs to clade Therapsida, which in turn is a clade within Synapsida. Synapsida represents one of two major branches of the crown group Amniota, (the other being Sauropsida, a clade which includes Lepidosauria, Dinosauria, Aves and Crocodilia). Cynodontia embody the transition from mammal like reptiles into modern mammals.

== Paleobiology ==
=== Posture ===
Since there is no postcranial skeleton for Abdalodon, the exact posture is unknown. However, assumptions about Abdalodon's posture were made, based on data collected from other cynodonts. For most cynodonts the articular surface of the femoral head is oriented 55° from the axis of the femoral shaft, compared with 80° in pelycosaurs and 25° in typical mammals. Additionally, the distal femoral condyles of cynodonts incline 45° from the long axis, but on the pelycosaur femur they run approximately parallel to the long axis. In mammals, the distal femoral condyles are perpendicular to the long axis. Cynodonts also possess a deeper acetabulum than pelycosaurs, and have an expanded ilium, and reduced ischium which is similar to the pelvic structure of modern mammals. When taken into account this evidence, it has been suggested that cynodonts like Abdalodon had a semi-sprawling posture, somewhere between the upright posture of modern mammals, and the sprawling posture of pelycosaurs. It has also been suggested that therapsids including early cynodonts, could have a hind limb posture which could alternate between sprawling and upright posture, in a condition similar to modern crocodilians. This hypothesis is based on the shape of the femoral head, in addition to an ankle joint that seems suited for articulation in both upright and sprawled posture.

=== Burrowing behavior ===
Though there is no direct evidence that Abdalodon burrowed, it is plausible that it did. There is clear evidence that the closely related Triassic cynodonts Thrinaxodon and Trirachodon, also from the Karoo Basin of South Africa, were burrowers. This suggests a long history of burrowing behavior in cynodonts.

=== Diet ===
Abdalodon's teeth do not appear well suited for chewing or grinding large quantities of plant matter. Therefore, Abdalodon, like most early cynodonts, was most likely an insectivore or carnivore which preyed upon most anything smaller than itself. It was not until the early to middle Triassic that cynodonts began to diversify their diets; some becoming omnivorous or herbivorous, while others remained carnivorous.

== See also ==
- Lists of synapsids
- Pelycosaurs
- Therapsids
- Cynodonts
