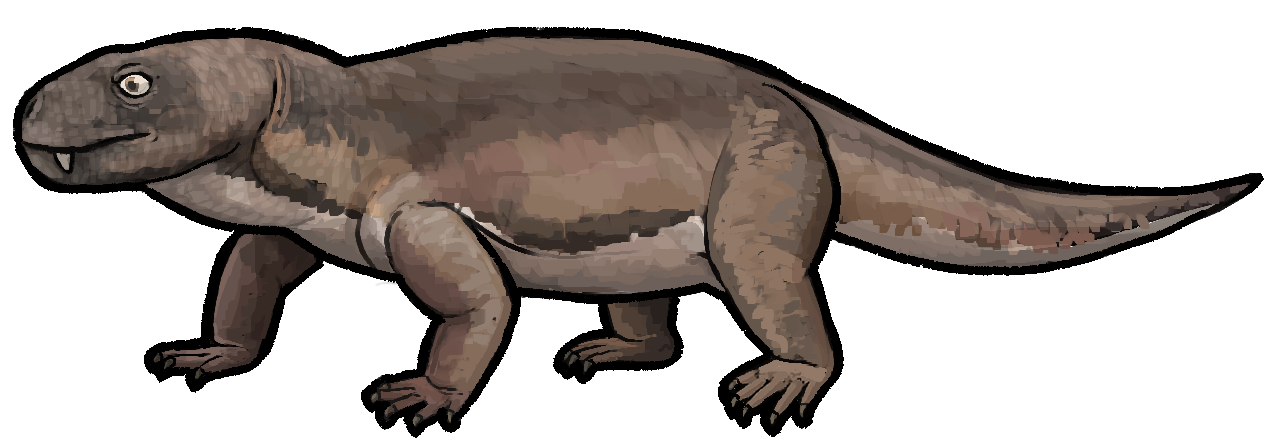
- Life Restoration

Scientific classification
- Kingdom: Animalia
- Phylum: Chordata
- Clade: Synapsida
- Clade: Therapsida
- Clade: Cynodontia
- Family: †Charassognathidae
- Subfamily: †Abdalodontinae
- Genus: †Nshimbodon; Huttenlocker & Sidor, 2020
- Species: †N. muchingaensis

Binomial name
- †Nshimbodon muchingaensis Huttenlocker & Sidor, 2020

= Nshimbodon =

Nshimbodon Temporal range: Wuchiapingian

Extinct genus of cynodonts

Nshimbodon is an extinct genus of basal cynodonts belonging to the family Charassognathidae. Its only known species is Nshimbodon muchingaensis, which was named in 2020 based on remains discovered in the Late Permian-aged Madumabisa Mudstone Formation of Zambia. It is known from a single specimen, which consists of a partial skull and several postcranial bones, including parts of the shoulder girdle and forelimbs.
