= Charassognathidae =

Charassognathids Temporal range: Late Permian (Wuchiapingian), 259–254 Ma
- Life restoration of Abdalodon diastematicus

Scientific classification
- Kingdom: Animalia
- Phylum: Chordata
- Clade: Synapsida
- Clade: Therapsida
- Clade: Cynodontia
- Family: †Charassognathidae; Kammerer, 2016

Genera
- †Charassognathus; †Abdalodontinae Huttenlocker et al., 2020; †Abdalodon; †Nshimbodon

Extinct family of cynodonts

Charassognathidae is an extinct family of basal cynodonts known from the Late Permian of South Africa and Zambia. It was named in 2016 by the palaeontologist Christian F. Kammerer, who defined it as all taxa more closely related to Charassognathus gracilis than to Dvinia prima, Galesaurus planiceps or Procynosuchus delaharpeae. The family contains the genera Charassognathus, Abdalodon and Nshimbodon, with the latter two making up the subfamily Abdalodontinae.
