= Biochron =

A biochron (from the Greek bios, life; and khronos, time) is the length of time represented by a biostratigraphic zone. Biochrons are named after characteristic fossil organisms or taxa that characterise that interval in time.
