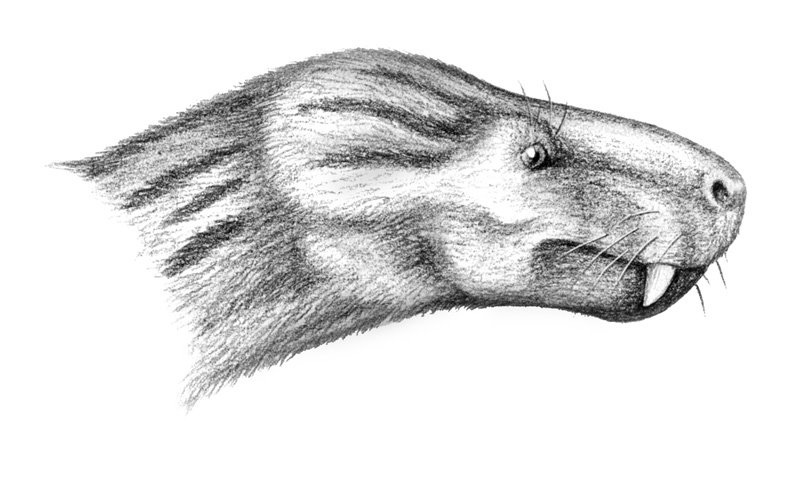
- Charassognathus gracilis, a basal cynodont

Scientific classification
- Kingdom: Animalia
- Phylum: Chordata
- Clade: Synapsida
- Clade: Therapsida
- Clade: Cynodontia
- Family: †Charassognathidae
- Genus: †Charassognathus; Botha et al., 2007

Species
- †C. gracilis Botha et al., 2007 (type)

= Charassognathus =

Charassognathus Temporal range: Wuchiapingian ~259–254 Ma

Extinct genus of cynodonts

Charassognathus (meaning 'notched jaw') is an extinct genus of Late Permian cynodonts. Described in 2007 from a locality near Fraserburg, South Africa, Charassognathus is one of the earliest and most basal cynodonts. It is known only from the holotype, which dates from the Late Permian Period. The type and only species is C. gracilis. The holotype (SAM-PK-K 10369), found in the Tropidostoma Assemblage Zone of the Teekloof Formation, is made up of a crushed skull, partial lower jaw and one leg.

Charassognathus was a quadrupedal predator. It was named for a notch on its coronoid process which most likely was the insertion point for a chewing muscle, the adductor mandibulae externus. Charassognathus was a small animal, with a skull only 5 centimetres (2.0 in) in length. Since the body of Charassognathus has not been discovered, its full length remains unknown, but estimates have been made at 50 centimetres (20 in).

== Description ==
Charassognathus has a snout that makes up slightly less than half of the total length of its skull and a long facial process on its septomaxilla. Other than these two features its skull is that of a typical cynodont. The odd shape of its septomaxilla is more typical of therocephalians than other cynodonts indicating that it may be close to a common ancestor between the two groups.

== See also ==
- List of therapsids
