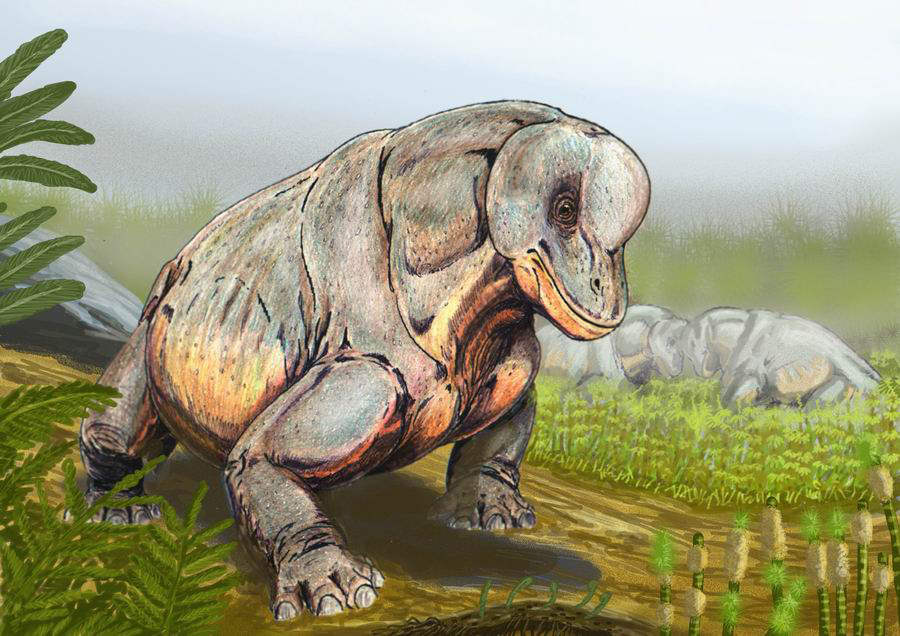
- Life restoration

Scientific classification
- Kingdom: Animalia
- Phylum: Chordata
- Clade: Synapsida
- Clade: Therapsida
- Suborder: †Dinocephalia
- Family: †Tapinocephalidae
- Subtribe: †Tapinocephalina
- Genus: †Tapinocephalus; Owen, 1876
- Species: †T. atherstonei

Binomial name
- †Tapinocephalus atherstonei Owen, 1876

Synonyms
- Mormosaurus(?); Phocosaurus; Taurops Broom, 1912

= Tapinocephalus =

Tapinocephalus Temporal range: 264.28–259.51 Ma Guadalupian epoch, Capitanian stage

Extinct genus of therapsids

Tapinocephalus ("low, depressed head") is an extinct genus of large herbivorous dinocephalians that lived during the Middle Permian Period in what is now South Africa. Only the type species, Tapinocephalus atherstonei is now considered valid for this genus.

== Discovery and naming ==
Fossils of Tapinocephalus atherstonei were collected and donated to the British Museum by William Guybon Atherstone. They were described by Richard Owen, who described and named the species in 1876. He initially considered it a close relative of Pareiasaurus and classified both as members of Dinosauria. Based on the only remains of the skull known at the time—a poorly-preserved partial snout—he believed it had a low, broad skull similar to labyrinthodonts. Owen accordingly named it Tapinocephalus, from Greek ταπεινός "low, depressed" and κεφαλή "head".

== Description ==
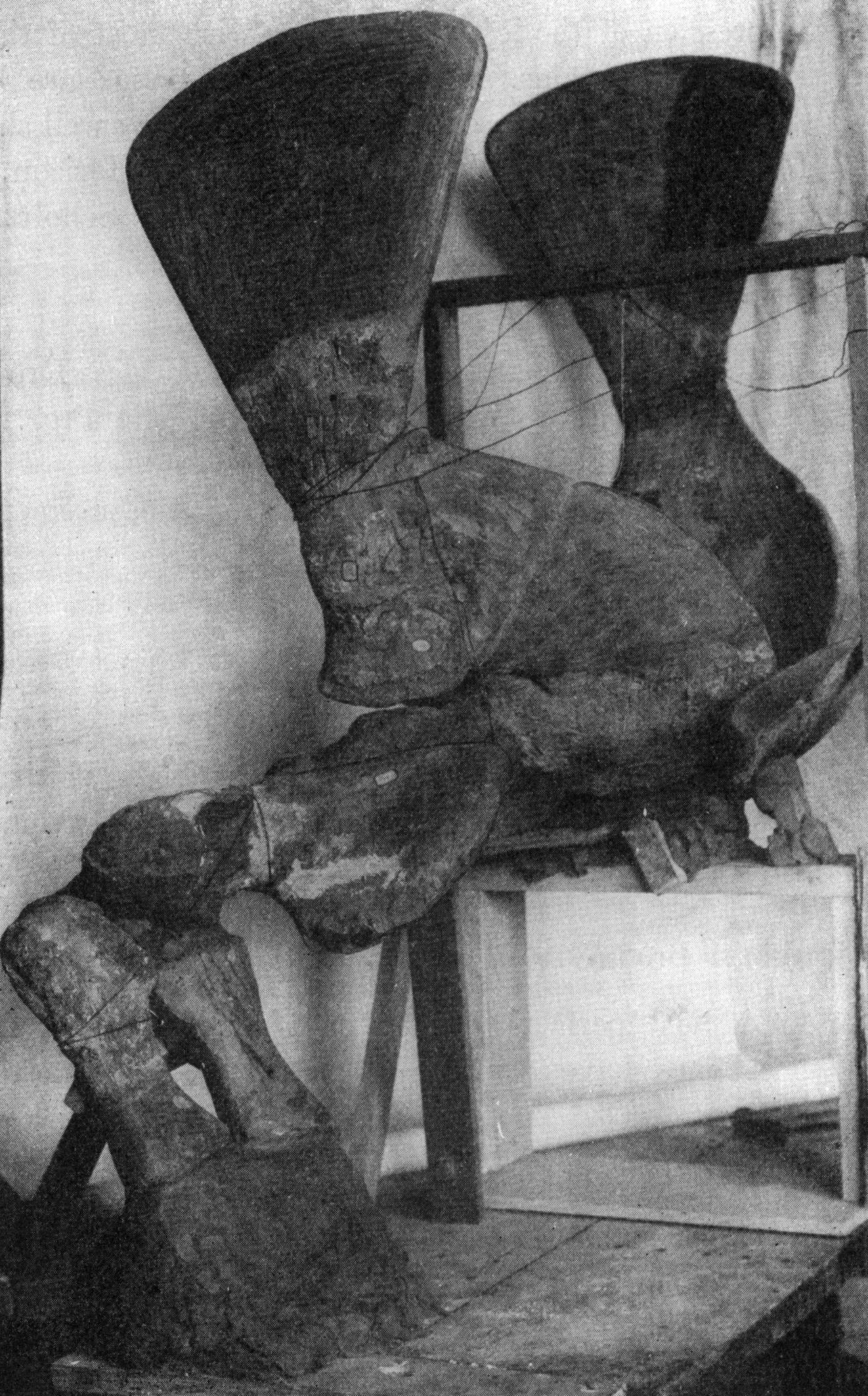
Tapinocephalus atherstonei shoulder girdle and front limb, specimen 5611.

These stocky, barrel-bodied animals were characterised by a massive bony skull roof and short weak snout. It is thought that, like other tapinocephalians, they engaged in intraspecific head-butting, possibly to compete for territory or mates. In life, they were over 3 metres (10 ft) in length and massed around 1.5 to 2 tonnes (3,300 to 4,400 lb), making them among the largest animals of their time.

Tapinocephalus atherstonei is known from a number of skulls and postcranial bones. The skull is large with a heavily pachyostotic skull roof, a massive bony frontals and a short weak Moschops-like snout.

== Distribution ==
The fossil remains (skull and postcranial elements) of Tapinocephalus are known from the Lower, Middle, and Upper part of the Tapinocephalus Assemblage Zone (Capitanian age) of the Lower Beaufort Beds of the South African Karoo.

== Taxonomy ==
Taurops is considered as a synonym of Tapinocephalus. Phocosaurus megischion is another synonym differing only in that the transition from the frontals to the snout is not abrupt.

== Paleoecology ==
Tapinocephalus fossils are found in the Diictodon–Styracocephalus subzone of the Tapinocephalus Assemblage Zone, of which it is the namesake. It is not particularly common. It was one of several tapinocephalids in the ecosystem.

== See also ==
- List of therapsids

== Sources ==
- Boonstra, L.D. 1956, "The skull of Tapinocephalus and its near relatives" Annals of the South African Museum, 43 Part 3 pp. 137–169, 17 figs, plate 4.
- 1969. The fauna of the Tapinocephalus Zone (Beaufort beds of the Karoo). Ann. S. Afr. Mus. 56:1–73.
- King, Gillian M., 1988 "Anomodontia" Part 17 C, Encyclopedia of Paleoherpetology, Gutsav Fischer Verlag, Stuttgart and New York.
