= Biozone =

Biostratigraphic unit in geology

Biozone types. Each rectangle represents bodies of sedimentary rocks and each line a different taxon. The arrows indicate the taxon first or last appearance.

In biostratigraphy, biostratigraphic units or biozones are intervals of geological strata that are defined on the basis of their characteristic fossil taxa, as opposed to a lithostratigraphic unit which is defined by the lithological properties of the surrounding rock.

A biostratigraphic unit is defined by the zone fossils it contains. These may be a single taxon or combinations of taxa if the taxa are relatively abundant, or variations in features related to the distribution of fossils. The same strata may be zoned differently depending on the diagnostic criteria or fossil group chosen, so there may be several, sometimes overlapping, biostratigraphic units in the same interval. Like lithostratigraphic units, biozones must have a type section designated as a stratotype. These stratotypes are named according to the typical taxon (or taxa) that is found in that particular biozone.

The boundary of two distinct biostratigraphic units is called a biohorizon. Biozones can be further subdivided into subbiozones, and multiple biozones can be grouped together in a superbiozone in which the grouped biozones usually have a related characteristic. A succession of biozones is called biozonation. The length of time represented by a biostratigraphic zone is called a biochron.

== History ==
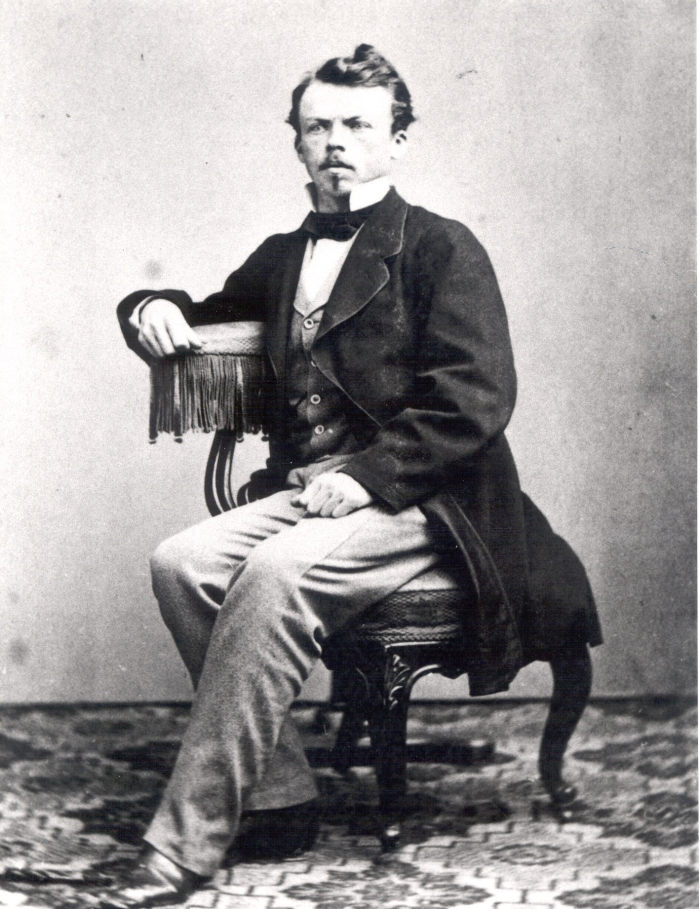
Albert Oppel

The concept of a biozone was first established by the 19th century paleontologist Albert Oppel, who characterized rock strata by the species of the fossilized animals found in them, which he called zone fossils. Oppel's biozonation was mainly based on Jurassic ammonites he found throughout Europe, which he used to classify the period into 33 zones (now 60). Alcide d'Orbigny would further reinforce the concept in his Prodrome de Paléontologie Stratigraphique, in which he established comparisons between geological stages and their biostratigraphy.

== Types of biozone ==
The International Commission on Stratigraphy defines the following types of biozones:

=== Range zones ===
Range zones are biozones defined by the geographic and stratigraphic range of occurrence of a taxon (or taxa). There are two types of range zones:

==== Taxon-range zones ====
A taxon-range zone is simply the biozone defined by the first (first appearance datum or FAD) and last (last appearance datum or LAD) occurrence of a single taxon. The boundaries are defined by the lowest and highest stratigraphic occurrence of that particular taxon. Taxon-range zones are named after the taxon in it.

==== Concurrent-range zone ====
A concurrent-range zone uses the overlapping range of two taxa, with low boundary defined by the appearance of one taxon and high boundary defined by the disappearance of the other taxon. Concurrent-range zones are named after both of the taxa in it.

=== Interval zones ===
An interval zone is defined as the body of strata between two bio-horizons, which are arbitrarily chosen. For example, a highest-occurrence zone is a biozone with the upper boundary being the appearance of one taxon, and the lower boundary the appearance of another taxon.

=== Lineage zones ===
A lineage zone, also called a consecutive range zone, are biozones which are defined by being a specific segment of an evolutionary lineage. For example, a zone can be bounded by the highest occurrence of the ancestor of a particular taxon and the lowest occurrence of its descendant, or between the lowest occurrence of a taxon and the lowest occurrence of its descendant. Lineage zones are different from most other biozones because they need that the segments its bounded by are successive segments of an evolutionary lineage. This makes them similar to chronostratigraphical units - however, lineage zones, being a biozone, are restricted by the actual spatial range of fossils. Lineage zones are named for the specific taxon they represent.

=== Assemblage zones ===
An assemblage zone is a biozone defined by three or more different taxa, which may or may not be related. The boundaries of an assemblage zone are defined by the typical, specified fossil assemblage's occurrence: this can include the appearance, but also the disappearance of certain taxa. Assemblage zones are named for the most characteristic or diagnostic fossils in its assemblage.

=== Abundance zones ===
An abundance zone, or acme zone, is a biozone that is defined by the range in which the abundance of a particular taxon is highest. Because an abundance zone requires a statistically high proportion of a particular taxon, the only way to define them is to trace the abundance of the taxon through time. As local environmental factors influence abundance, this can be an unreliable way of defining a biozone. Abundance zones are named after the taxon that is the most abundant within its range.

== Zone fossils used for biozonation ==
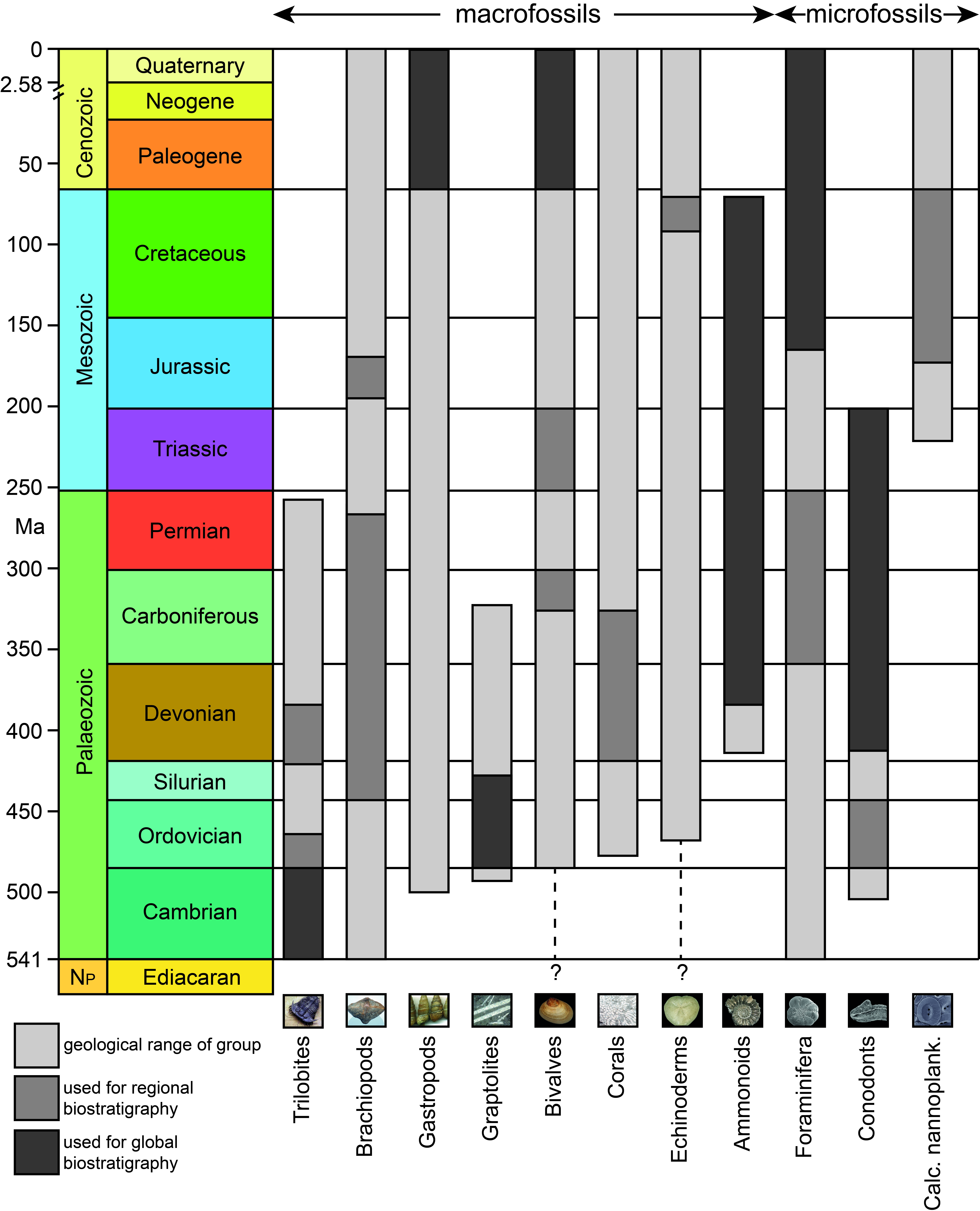
Commonly used zone fossils (from the Cambrian onwards).

A great variety of species can be used in establishing biozonation. Graptolites and ammonites are some of the most useful as zone fossils, as they preserve well and often have relatively short biozones. Microfossils, such as dinoflagellates, foraminiferans, or plant pollen are also good candidates because they tend to be present even in very small samples and evolve relatively rapidly. Fossils of pigs and cannabis can be used for biozonation of Quaternary rocks as they were used by hominids.

As only a small portion of fossils are preserved, a biozone does not represent the true range of that species in time. Moreover, ranges can be influenced by the Signor-Lipps effect, meaning that the last "disappearance" of a species tends to be observed further back in time than was actually the case.

== See also ==
- Biochronology
- Teilzone
- Acme zone
- Lithostratigraphy
- Chronostratigraphy
- Index fossil
