= 2023 in paleontology =

Paleontology or palaeontology is the study of prehistoric life forms on Earth through the examination of plant and animal fossils. This includes the study of body fossils, tracks (ichnites), burrows, cast-off parts, fossilised feces (coprolites), palynomorphs and chemical residues. Because humans have encountered fossils for millennia, paleontology has a long history both before and after becoming formalized as a science. This article records significant discoveries and events related to paleontology that occurred or were published in the year 2023.

== Flora ==
=== "Algae" ===
Name	Novelty	Status	Authors	Age	Type locality	Country	Notes	Images
Glossophyton ovalis	Sp. nov		Qin et al.	Late Paleoproterozoic to Tonian	Liulaobei Formation	China		
Glossophyton shouxianensis	Sp. nov		Qin et al.	Tonian	Liulaobei Formation	China		
Houjiashania	Gen. et sp. nov	Valid	Liu et al.	Ediacaran	Dengying Formation	China	A possible brown alga. The type species is H. yuxiensis. Announced in 2023; the final version of the article naming it was published in 2024.	
Tawuia robusta	Sp. nov		Qin et al.	Late Paleoproterozoic to Tonian	Liulaobei Formation	China		

==== Phycological research ====
- Liu et al. (2023) report the discovery of approximately 1.64-billion-years-old multicellular fossils from the Chuanlinggou Formation (China), providing evidence that the multicellular algae had already originated by the late Paleoproterozoic.
- A study on deep-sea organic-rich deposits from the Waiheke Island (New Zealand) is published by Grasby et al. (2023), who interpret the studied deposits as lamalginites formed from phytoplankton, providing evidence of an open-ocean algal bloom during the Permian-Triassic transition.
- A study on the fossil material of rhodolith-forming coralline red algae from the Miocene Long Formation from the Little Andaman (India), interpreted as indicative of high carbonate production in the northeastern Indian Ocean during the Serravallian, is published by Dey et al. (2023).

=== Fungi ===
Name	Novelty	Status	Authors	Age	Type locality	Location	Notes	Images
Meliolinites miopanici	Sp. nov	Valid	Kundu & Khan	Miocene		India	A member of the family Meliolaceae. Announced in 2023; the final version of the article naming it was published in 2024.	
Porterra	Gen. et sp. nov		Retallack	Tonian	Chuar Group	United States (Arizona)	A lichen-like thalli. The type species is P. dehlerae.	
Potteromyces	Gen. et sp. nov		Strullu-Derrien & Hawksworth in Strullu-Derrien et al.	Devonian	Rhynie chert	United Kingdom	A member of Ascomycota of uncertain affinities. The type species is P. asteroxylicola.	
Rhyniomycelium	Gen. et sp. nov		Krings & Harper	Devonian	Rhynie chert	United Kingdom	A fungal mycelium of uncertain affinities. Genus includes new species R. endoconidiarum.	
Szaferomyces	Gen. et sp. nov		Worobiec & Piątek in Worobiec, Piątek & Worobiec	Pliocene		Poland	A member of Ascomycota of uncertain affinities, with resemblances to modern powdery mildews. The type species is S. pliocenicus.	

==== Mycological research ====
- New information on the anatomy of Sporocarpon asteroides, inferred from new specimens from the Lower Coal Measures (United Kingdom), is presented by Krings et al. (2023), who interpret S. asteroides as a unisporic sporocarp with a parenchyma-like peridium, probably with affinities to the Glomeromycota.
- The first finding of a mycelium of a putative nematophagous fungus belonging to the group Basidiomycota from the Cretaceous of North Asia is reported from the Santonian Yantardakh Lagerstätte (Taymyr, Russia) by Sukhomlyn & Perkovsky (2023).
- Kutchiathyrites eccentricus is transferred to the modern genus Mycoenterolobium by Worobiec, Worobiec & Liu (2023) on the basis of study of the fossil material from the Neogene deposits of the Gray Fossil Site (Tennessee, United States) and the Bełchatów Lignite Mine (Poland).

== Cnidarians ==
=== New cnidarian taxa ===
Name	Novelty	Status	Authors	Age	Type locality	Country	Notes	Images
Acropora cabuyaoensis	Sp. nov	Valid	Niko & Suzuki	Miocene	Kennon Limestone	Philippines	A species of Acropora.	
Actinophrentis crassithecata	Sp. nov		El-Desouky, Herbig & Kora	Carboniferous (Kasimovian)	Aheimer Formation	Egypt	A rugose coral belonging to the group Stauriida and the family Antiphyllidae.	
Apoplacophyllia polygonata	Sp. nov	Valid	Samaniego-Pesqueira, Löser & Moreno-Bedmar	Early Cretaceous (Albian)	Espinazo del Diablo Formation	Mexico	A coral belonging to the superfamily Stylinoidea and the family Aulastraeoporidae.	
Aulastraeopora aguedae	Sp. nov	Valid	Samaniego-Pesqueira, Löser & Moreno-Bedmar	Early Cretaceous (Albian)	Espinazo del Diablo Formation	Mexico	A coral belonging to the superfamily Stylinoidea and the family Aulastraeoporidae.	
Bertratis	Gen. et sp. nov	Valid	Larson & Briggs	Silurian (Přídolí)	Bertie Group	Canada (Ontario); United States (New York)	A hydrozoan belonging to the group Capitata and the superfamily Porpitoidea. The type species is B. ciurcae.	
Burgessomedusa	Gen. et sp. nov	Valid	Moon, Caron & Moysiuk	Cambrian	Burgess Shale	Canada (British Columbia)	A medusozoan, possibly a member of the stem group to Cubozoa or Acraspeda; described on the basis of fossil material representing a free-swimming medusa. The type species is B. phasmiformis.	
Catenipora seiyoensis	Sp. nov	Valid	Niko	Silurian	Okanaro Group	Japan	A tabulate coral belonging to the group Halysitida and the family Halysitidae.	
Decimoconularia anisfacialis	Sp. nov		Song et al.	Cambrian (Fortunian)	Kuanchuanpu Formation	China	A medusozoan, possibly a member of Conulata.	
Enallhelia octasepta	Sp. nov	Valid	Löser, Werner & Darga	Late Cretaceous (Cenomanian)	Branderfleck Formation	Germany	A coral belonging to the superfamily Stylinoidea and the family Stylinidae.	
Kumamotolites	Gen. et sp. nov	Valid	Niko	Devonian	Naidaijin Formation	Japan	A coral belonging to the group Auloporida and the family Bajgoliidae. The type species is K. patulus.	
Lytvolasma aheimerensis	Sp. nov		El-Desouky, Herbig & Kora	Carboniferous (Kasimovian)	Aheimer Formation	Egypt	A rugose coral belonging to the group Stauriida and the family Antiphyllidae.	
Lytvolasma paraaucta	Sp. nov		El-Desouky, Herbig & Kora	Carboniferous (Kasimovian)	Aheimer Formation	Egypt	A rugose coral belonging to the group Stauriida and the family Antiphyllidae.	
Monophyllum galalaensis	Sp. nov		El-Desouky, Herbig & Kora	Carboniferous (Kasimovian)	Aheimer Formation	Egypt	A rugose coral belonging to the group Stauriida and the family Antiphyllidae.	
Notocyathus suzukii	Sp. nov	Valid	Niko	Miocene	Katsuta Group	Japan	A stony coral.	
Palaeoconotuba	Gen. et comb. nov		Qu, Li & Ou	Cambrian		China	A stem-medusozoan; a new genus for "Burithes" yunnanensis Hou et al. (1999).	
Parabyronia	Gen et sp. nov		Mergl & Kraft	Devonian (Emsian)	Zlíchov Formation	Czech Republic	A member of Scyphozoa belonging to the group Byroniida and the family Byroniidae. The type species is P. elegans.	
Pentacoeniopsis	Gen. et sp. nov	Valid	Samaniego-Pesqueira, Löser & Moreno-Bedmar	Early Cretaceous (Albian)	Espinazo del Diablo Formation	Mexico	A coral belonging to the superfamily Eugyroidea and the family Solenocoeniidae. The type species is P. sonorensis.	
Pidiconularia	Gen. et sp. nov		Mergl & Kraft	Devonian (Emsian)	Zlíchov Formation	Czech Republic	A member of Conulariida. The type species is P. tubulata.	
Prestephanoscyphus branzovensis	Sp. nov		Mergl & Kraft	Devonian (Lochkovian)	Lochkov Formation	Czech Republic	A member of Scyphozoa belonging to the group Byroniida and the family Byroniidae.	
Prestephanoscyphus robustus	Sp. nov		Mergl & Kraft	Devonian (Eifelian)	Srbsko Formation	Czech Republic	A member of Scyphozoa belonging to the group Byroniida and the family Byroniidae.	
Proaplophyllia slovakensis	Sp. nov		Lathuilière et al.	Middle Jurassic (Bajocian)		Slovakia	A coral.	
Reticulaconularia caetensis	Sp. nov	Valid	Guedes, Siviero & Scheffler	Devonian (Pragian–early Emsian)	Ponta Grossa Formation	Brazil	A member of Conulariida.	
Rugoconites reguibatensis	Sp. nov		Hachour et al.	Neoproterozoic	Cheikhia-Bir Amrane Group	Algeria	A scyphozoan of uncertain affinities.	
Streptelasma rutkae	Sp. nov	Valid	Elias & Hewitt	Ordovician (Hirnantian)	Whirlpool Formation	Canada (Ontario)	A rugose coral.	
Stylina eguchii	Sp. nov	Valid	Niko	Early Cretaceous (Aptian)	Miyako Group	Japan	A stony coral, a species of Stylina.	
Sueciatractos	Gen. et sp. nov	Valid	Reich & Kutscher	Silurian	Hemse Group	Sweden	An octocoral belonging to the group Malacalcyonacea. The type species is S. leipnitzae.	

=== Cnidarian research ===
- Pywackia baileyi, originally classified as a bryozoan, is reinterpreted as a cnidarian by Hageman & Vinn (2023).
- Conulariid specimens preserved with muscle bundles and a possible gastric cavity are described from the Carboniferous Wewoka and Graham formations (Oklahoma and Texas, United States) by Sendino et al. (2023).
- Van Iten et al. (2023) describe soft parts of two specimens of Metaconularia manni from the Silurian (Sheinwoodian) Scotch Grove Formation (Iowa, United States), and interpret their anatomy as indicating that at least one species of conulariid might have lacked a free-living, medusoid life phase, and might have produced eggs and sperm within the body of the sessile polyp.
- Redescription of Conicula striata is published by Zhao et al. (2023), who report that C. striata had features of both anthozoans and medusozoan polyps, and recover it as a stem-medusozoan, potentially indicating that medusozoans had an anemone-like ancestor.
- Zhang et al. (2023) describe new fossil material of Qinscyphus necopinus from the Cambrian (Fortunian) Kuanchuanpu Formation (China), including the whole apical part and providing complete information on the morphology of Qinscyphus.
- Plotnick, Young & Hagadorn (2023) classify Essexella asherae as a sea anemone, and reinterpret Reticulomedusa greenei as the pedal or oral disc of E. asherae.

== Bryozoans ==
=== New bryozoan taxa ===
Name	Novelty	Status	Authors	Age	Type locality	Location	Notes	Images
Boardmanella spinigera	Sp. nov	Valid	Ernst & Rodríguez	Devonian (Emsian)		Spain	A trepostome bryozoan belonging to the family Anisotrypidae.	
Cordobella	Gen. et sp. nov	Valid	Ernst & Rodríguez	Devonian (Pragian)		Spain	A trepostome bryozoan of uncertain affinities. The type species is C. tenuis.	
Diploclemella	Gen. et sp. nov	Valid	Ernst & Rodríguez	Devonian (Pragian–Emsian)		Spain	A cyclostome bryozoan belonging to the family Diploclemidae. The type species is D. serenensis.	
Elea parva	Sp. nov	Valid	Koromyslova	Early Cretaceous (probably Hauterivian)		Russia (Dagestan)	A cyclostome bryozoan belonging to the family Eleidae.	
Iodictyum akaishiensis	Sp. nov	Valid	Arakawa	Miocene (Langhian)	Moniwa Formation	Japan	A member of the family Phidoloporidae. Published online in 2022, but the issue date is listed as January 2023.	
Leptotrypa modesta	Sp. nov	Valid	Ernst & Rodríguez	Devonian (Pragian)		Spain	A trepostome bryozoan belonging to the family Atactotoechidae.	
Leptotrypa parva	Sp. nov	Valid	Ernst & Rodríguez	Devonian (Emsian)		Spain	A trepostome bryozoan belonging to the family Atactotoechidae.	
Melicerita imperforata	Sp. nov	Valid	López-Gappa & Pérez	Miocene	Monte León Formation	Argentina	A member of the family Cellariidae.	
Microporina minuta	Sp. nov	In press	Arakawa	Pleistocene	Setana Formation	Japan	A species of Microporina.	
Microporina quadristoma	Sp. nov	In press	Arakawa	Pleistocene	Setana Formation	Japan	A species of Microporina.	
Microporina sakakurai	Sp. nov	In press	Arakawa	Pleistocene	Setana Formation	Japan	A species of Microporina.	
Microporina soebetsuensis	Sp. nov	In press	Arakawa	Pleistocene	Setana Formation	Japan	A species of Microporina.	
Prophyllodictya khrevitsa	Sp. nov	Valid	Tolokonnikova & Fedorov	Ordovician (Sandbian)		Russia (Leningrad Oblast)	A cryptostome bryozoan.	
Rorypora gunibensis	Sp. nov	Valid	Koromyslova	Early Cretaceous (probably Hauterivian)		Russia (Dagestan)	A cyclostome bryozoan.	
Serenella	Gen. et sp. nov	Valid	Ernst & Rodríguez	Devonian (Pragian–Emsian)		Spain	A cryptostome bryozoan belonging to the group Rhabdomesina. The type species is S. dubia.	
Spiropora flaviae	Nom. nov	Valid	Pacaud	Miocene		France	A member of Cyclostomata belonging to the family Spiroporidae; a replacement name for Spiropora elegans Millet de la Turtaudière (1865).	
Suecipora	Gen. et sp. nov		Ernst & Tolokonnikova	Ordovician		Sweden	A possible cystoporate bryozoan. The type species is S. ebbestadi.	
Toomipora	Gen. et sp. nov	Valid	Ernst	Ordovician (Sandbian)	Viivikonna Formation	Estonia	A trepostome bryozoan belonging to the family Monticuliporidae. The type species is T. kohtlaensis.	

== Brachiopods ==
=== New brachiopod taxa ===
Name	Novelty	Status	Authors	Age	Type locality	Location	Notes	Images
Acculina zhongliangziensis	Sp. nov	In press	Wang et al.	Ordovician	Huadan Formation	China		
Acrosaccus robustus	Sp. nov	Valid	Mergl & Šmídtová	Devonian (Pragian)	Vinařice Limestone	Czech Republic	A member of the family Discinidae.	
Angustisulcispirifer	Gen. et sp. nov	Valid	Serobyan et al.	Devonian (Frasnian, possibly also Famennian)		Armenia; Azerbaijan; Kazakhstan?	A member of Spiriferida belonging to the family Cyrtospiriferidae. The type species is A. arakelyani; genus might also include "Cyrtospirifer" kursaensis Sidjachenko (1962) and "Cyrtospirifer" limatus Solkina in Sidjachenko (1962) .	
Argyrotheca ramshehensis	Sp. nov	Valid	Bitner et al.	Oligocene (Rupelian)	Lower Red Formation	Iran	A species of Argyrotheca.	
Bulgariarhynchia	Gen. et sp. nov	Valid	Radulović et al.	Jurassic		Bulgaria	Genus includes new species B. ponorensis.	
Callispirina sheni	Sp. nov	Valid	Tazawa in Tazawa & Ibaraki	Permian (Guadalupian)		Japan	A member of Spiriferinida belonging to the family Paraspiriferinidae.	
Capillirhynchia brezenensis	Sp. nov	Valid	Radulović et al.	Jurassic		Bulgaria		
Celdobolus skrikus	Sp. nov	Valid	Lavié & Benedetto	Ordovician (Tremadocian)	Pupusa Formation	Argentina	A member of Siphonotretida belonging to the family Siphonotretidae.	
Cisnerospira antipoda	Sp. nov	Valid	MacFarlan	Early Jurassic		New Zealand	A member of Spiriferinida belonging to the group Paralaballidae.	
Crinisarina merriami	Sp. nov	Valid	Baranov et al.	Devonian (Famennian)	Khoshyeilagh Formation	Iran	A member of Athyridida.	
Cyclothyris bitririca	Sp. nov		Baeza-Carratalá, Berrocal-Casero & García Joral	Early Cretaceous (Albian)	Represa Formation	Spain		
Cyclothyris ementitum	Sp. nov	Valid	Berrocal-Casero, Baeza-Carratalá & García Joral	Cretaceous (Albian–Cenomanian)	Represa Formation	Spain		
Discinisca messii	Sp. nov	Valid	Pérez et al.	Miocene	Gaiman Formation	Argentina	A species of Discinisca.	
Discinisca porvenir	Sp. nov	Valid	Pérez et al.	Miocene	Gaiman Formation	Argentina	A species of Discinisca.	
Eoobolus acutulus	Sp. nov		Zhang, Zhang & Holmer in Zhang et al.	Cambrian Series 2	Shuijingtuo Formation	China	A member of Linguloidea belonging to the family Eoobolidae.	
Ffynnonia costata hibernica	Ssp. nov	In press	Harper & Bates	Ordovician (Dapingian)	Tagoat Group	Ireland	A plectorthid brachiopod.	
Gympietes aseptus	Sp. nov	Valid	Waterhouse	Permian (Asselian)	Rammutt Formation	Australia	A member of the family Rugosochonetidae.	
Hiranesania	Gen. et comb. nov	Valid	Tazawa & Waterhouse	Permian	Kanokura Formation	Japan	A member of Productida belonging to the superfamily Paucispiniferoidea and the family Anidanthidae. The type species is "Terrakea" japonica Tazawa (2008).	
Hirsutella sulcata	Sp. nov		Wu et al.	Early Triassic (Olenekian)	Nanpanjiang Basin	China	A member of Spiriferinida belonging to the family Bittnerulidae.	
Jigunsania	Gen. et 2 sp. nov	Valid	Oh et al.	Ordovician (Darriwilian)	Jigunsan Formation	South Korea	A member of Strophomenoidea belonging to the family Rafinesquinidae. The type species is J. guraeriensis; genus also includes J. hambaeksanensis.	
Kassinella (Trimurellina) minuta	Sp. nov	In press	Wang et al.	Ordovician	Huadan Formation	China		
Latusobolus	Gen. et sp. nov		Zhang, Zhang & Holmer in Zhang et al.	Cambrian Series 2	Shuijingtuo Formation	China	A member of Linguloidea belonging to the family Eoobolidae. The type species is L. xiaoyangbaensis.	
Leiocyrtia	Gen. et sp. nov	Valid	Baliński in Baliński & Halamski	Devonian (Givetian)	Skały Formation	Poland	A member of Spiriferida belonging to the family Cyrtiidae. The type species is L. rara.	
Lobothyris richardsi	Sp. nov	Valid	MacFarlan	Late Triassic (Rhaetian)		New Zealand	A member of Terebratulida belonging to the family Lobothyrididae.	
Martinothyris pseudolineatus	Sp. nov	Valid	Baranov et al.	Devonian (Famennian)	Khoshyeilagh Formation	Iran	A member of Spiriferida.	
Moravilla andreae	Sp. nov	Valid	Baliński & Halamski	Devonian (Givetian)	Skały Formation	Poland	A member of Spiriferida belonging to the family Ambocoeliidae.	
Ningnanmena	Gen. et sp. nov	In press	Wang et al.	Ordovician	Huadan Formation	China	Genus includes new species N. longisepta.	
Notostrophia simplicata	Sp. nov	Valid	Waterhouse	Permian		New Zealand	A member of Strophomenata belonging to the superfamily Orthotetoidea and the family Schuchertellidae.	
Palaeotagoatia	Gen. et comb. nov	In press	Harper & Bates	Ordovician		Ireland	An alimbellid brachiopod. The type species is "Orthis" bailyana Davidson.	
Paradoxothyris flatus	Sp. nov		Wu et al.	Early Triassic (Olenekian)	Nanpanjiang Basin	China	A member of Terebratulida belonging to the family Angustothyrididae.	
Paramesolobus kitakamiensis	Sp. nov	Valid	Tazawa in Tazawa & Ibaraki	Permian (Guadalupian)		Japan	A member of Productida belonging to the family Rugosochonetidae.	
Paucispinauria concava multispina	Ssp. nov	Valid	Waterhouse	Permian (Asselian)	Oxtrack Formation	Australia	A member of Productida belonging to the superfamily Proboscidelloidea and the family Paucispinauriidae.	
Platycancrinella lata	Sp. nov	Valid	Waterhouse	Permian		Australia	A member of Productida belonging to the superfamily Proboscidelloidea and the family Paucispinauriidae.	
Plicapustula (Paraplicapustula) eleganta	Sp. nov	Valid	Ma & Wang in Wang et al.	Devonian (Famennian)	Senzeille Formation	Belgium	A member of Spiriferida belonging to the family Cyrtospiriferidae.	
Plicapustula (Paraplicapustula) magna	Sp. nov	Valid	Ma & Wang in Wang et al.	Devonian (Famennian)	Senzeille Formation	Belgium	A member of Spiriferida belonging to the family Cyrtospiriferidae.	
Plicogypa kayseri alaskensis	Ssp. nov		Baranov & Blodgett	Devonian (Pragian)	Soda Creek Limestone	United States (Alaska)	Published online in 2024, but the issue date is listed as December 2023.	
Protathyris amsdeni	Sp. nov		Baranov & Blodgett	Devonian (Pragian)	Soda Creek Limestone	United States (Alaska)	Published online in 2024, but the issue date is listed as December 2023.	
Rhaetina rainei	Sp. nov	Valid	MacFarlan	Late Triassic (Rhaetian)		France (New Caledonia); New Zealand	A member of Terebratulida belonging to the family Angustothyrididae.	
Rzhonsnitskayaella	Gen. et sp. nov		Baranov & Blodgett	Devonian (Pragian)	Soda Creek Limestone	United States (Alaska)	Genus includes new species R. lata. Published online in 2024, but the issue date is listed as December 2023.	
Schizambon tongziensis	Sp. nov		Jahangir et al.	Ordovician	Tungtzu Formation	China	A member of Siphonotretida.	
Sellithyris binalubensis	Sp. nov		Baeza-Carratalá, Berrocal-Casero & García Joral	Cretaceous (Albian–Cenomanian transition)	Represa Formation	Spain	A member of Terebratulida belonging to the family Sellithyrididae.	
Sinospirifer transversus	Sp. nov	Valid	Ma & Wang in Wang et al.	Devonian (Famennian)	Senzeille Formation	Belgium	A member of Spiriferida belonging to the family Cyrtospiriferidae.	
Somalithyris roseperae	Sp. nov	Valid	Feldman et al.	Middle Jurassic (Callovian)		Israel	A member of Terebratulida belonging to the family Postepithyrididae.	
Spiriferina arakiwa	Sp. nov	Valid	MacFarlan	Early Jurassic		New Zealand; New Caledonia?	A member of Spiriferinida belonging to the family Spiriferinidae.	
Spiriferina sophiaealbae	Sp. nov	Valid	MacFarlan	Early Jurassic		New Zealand	A member of Spiriferinida belonging to the family Spiriferinidae.	
Sulcatinella elongata	Sp. nov		Wu et al.	Early Triassic (Olenekian)	Nanpanjiang Basin	China	A member of Terebratulida belonging to the family Dielasmatidae.	
Tasmanospirifer jervisbayensis	Sp. nov	Valid	Waterhouse & Lee in Lee et al.	Permian (Kungurian)	Snapper Point Formation	Australia		
Terrakea elongata crassicosta	Ssp. nov	Valid	Waterhouse	Permian	Mangarewa Formation	New Zealand	A member of Productida belonging to the superfamily Proboscidelloidea and the family Paucispinauriidae.	
Thecidellina persica	Sp. nov	Valid	Bitner et al.	Oligocene (Rupelian)	Lower Red Formation	Iran	A species of Thecidellina.	
Tibetothyris hamishi	Sp. nov	Valid	MacFarlan	Late Triassic (Rhaetian)		France (New Caledonia); New Zealand	A member of Terebratulida belonging to the family Dielasmatidae.	
Tibetothyris johnstoni	Sp. nov	Valid	MacFarlan	Late Triassic (Rhaetian)		France (New Caledonia); New Zealand	A member of Terebratulida belonging to the family Dielasmatidae.	
Undispirifer sidoniae	Sp. nov	Valid	Halamski & Baliński	Devonian (Givetian)	Skały Formation	Poland	A member of Spiriferida belonging to the family Reticulariidae.	
Whitspakia nipponica	Sp. nov	Valid	Tazawa in Tazawa & Ibaraki	Permian (Guadalupian)		Japan	A member of Terebratulida belonging to the family Dielasmatidae.	
Xahetomus deltoides	Sp. nov	Valid	Wenndorf	Devonian (Emsian)		Germany	A member of Rhynchonellida belonging to the superfamily Rhynchotrematoidea and the family Sapphicorhynchidae.	
Zeilleria minima	Sp. nov	Valid	MacFarlan	Late Triassic (Rhaetian)		France (New Caledonia); New Zealand	A member of Terebratulida belonging to the family Zeilleriidae.	

=== Brachiopod research ===
- Body and trace fossils indicative of early colonization of deep-marine turbidite settings by lingulid brachiopods are reported from the Ordovician Agüeira Formation (Spain) by Paz et al. (2023).
- A study on the diversification dynamics of brachiopods and bivalves throughout their evolutionary histories is published by Guo et al. (2023), who interpret their findings as indicating that the switch from brachiopods to bivalves as major seabed organisms was unlikely to be caused by competitive exclusion of brachiopods by bivalves, but rather was likely caused by loss of brachiopod diversity in the Permian–Triassic extinction event and by bivalve diversification in the Cretaceous and Cenozoic that wasn't matched by brachiopods.
- A study on the morphological diversity of lingulid brachiopods throughout the Phanerozoic is published by Liang et al. (2023), who find that Phanerozoic mass extinctions disproportionally wiped out lingulids that were not infaunal, and interpret the limited morphological and ecological diversity of modern lingulids as mainly resulting from differential effects of mass extinctions rather than from deterministic processes such as natural selection.

== Echinoderms ==
=== New echinoderm taxa ===
Name	Novelty	Status	Authors	Age	Type locality	Location	Notes	Images
Agaricocrinus murphyi	Sp. nov	Valid	Ausich & Wilson	Carboniferous (Tournaisian)	Cuyahoga Formation	United States (Ohio)	A camerate crinoid belonging to the group Monobathrida and the family Coelocrinidae.	
Arbacia ballenensis	Sp. nov	Valid	Courville et al.	Late Pliocene—Early Pleistocene		Mexico	A species of Arbacia.	
Arbacia larraini	Sp. nov	Valid	Courville et al.	Pliocene		Chile	A species of Arbacia.	
Arbacia quyllur	Sp. nov	Valid	Courville et al.	Miocene		Chile	A species of Arbacia.	
Arbacia terraeignotae	Sp. nov	Valid	Courville et al.	Pliocene		Chile	A species of Arbacia.	
Arenorbis santameraensis	Sp. nov		Thuy, Piñuela & García-Ramos	Early Jurassic (Sinemurian)	Rodiles Formation	Spain	A brittle star belonging to the order Ophiacanthida and the suborder Ophiodermatina.	
Bohemiacinctus	Gen. et comb. nov	Valid	Zamora, Wright & Nohejlová	Cambrian (Wuliuan)		Czech Republic	A member of the group Cincta belonging to the family Sucocystidae. The type species is "Asturicystis" havliceki Fatka & Kordule (2001).	
Cactocrinus woosterensis	Sp. nov	Valid	Ausich & Wilson	Carboniferous (Tournaisian)	Cuyahoga Formation	United States (Ohio)	A camerate crinoid belonging to the group Monobathrida and the family Actinocrinitidae.	
Calliocrinus hadros	Sp. nov	Valid	Ausich et al.	Silurian (Homerian)	Laurel Formation	United States (Ohio)	A crinoid belonging to the group Monobathrida and the family Eucalyptocrinitidae.	
Calliocrinus poepplemani	Sp. nov	Valid	Ausich et al.	Silurian (Homerian)	Laurel Formation	United States (Ohio)	A crinoid belonging to the group Monobathrida and the family Eucalyptocrinitidae.	
Cosmocyphus cantaber	Sp. nov		Schlüter et al.	Late Cretaceous (Santonian)		Spain	A sea urchin belonging to the family Phymosomatidae.	
Coulonia hokahira	Sp. nov		Gale et al.	Early Cretaceous (Albian)	Enokuchi Formation	Japan	An astropectinid starfish.	
Cusacrinus brushi	Sp. nov	Valid	Ausich & Wilson	Carboniferous (Tournaisian)	Cuyahoga Formation	United States (Ohio)	A camerate crinoid belonging to the group Monobathrida and the family Actinocrinitidae.	
Dadocrinus montellonis	Sp. nov	Valid	Saucède et al.	Early Triassic (Olenekian)	Thaynes Group	United States (Nevada)	A crinoid belonging to the group Articulata and the family Dadocrinidae.	
Decadocrinus inordinatus	Sp. nov	Valid	Ausich & Wilson	Carboniferous (Tournaisian)	Cuyahoga Formation	United States (Ohio)	A crinoid belonging to the group Cladida and the family Decadocrinidae.	
Decadocrinus laevis	Sp. nov	Valid	Ausich & Wilson	Carboniferous (Tournaisian)	Cuyahoga Formation	United States (Ohio)	A crinoid belonging to the group Cladida and the family Decadocrinidae.	
Dehmicystis ariasi	Sp. nov	Valid	Zamora & Gutiérrez-Marco	Silurian (Ludlow)	Llagarinos Formation	Spain	A member of Soluta belonging to the group Dendrocystitida and the family Dendrocystitidae.	
Dentatocrinus serratus	Sp. nov	Valid	Gale	Late Cretaceous (Cenomanian)	Chalk Group (Grey Chalk Subgroup, Zig Zag Formation)	United Kingdom	A crinoid belonging to the family Roveacrinidae.	
Devonaster daadenensis	Sp. nov	Valid	Müller & Hahn	Devonian (Emsian)		Germany	A starfish belonging to the group Hadrosida and the family Xenasteridae.	
Devonaster wenndorfi	Sp. nov	Valid	Müller & Hahn	Devonian (Emsian)		Germany	A starfish belonging to the group Hadrosida and the family Xenasteridae.	
Diplocidaris friasensis	Sp. nov	Valid	Vadet & Nicolleau	Late Jurassic (Kimmeridgian)		Spain	A sea urchin belonging to the family Diplocidaridae.	
Dubrisicrinus	Gen. et sp. nov	Valid	Gale	Late Cretaceous (Cenomanian)	Chalk Group (Grey Chalk Subgroup, Zig Zag Formation)	United Kingdom	A crinoid belonging to the family Roveacrinidae. The type species is D. minutus.	
Edrioblastocystis	Nom. nov		Ceccolini & Cianferoni	Ordovician		Russia	A replacement name for Blastocystis Jaekel (1918). Sałamatin & Kaczmarek (2022) coined a replacement name Astroblastocystis for the same genus.	
Euzonohymenosoma	Nom. nov	In press	Ceccolini & Cianferoni	Devonian		Germany	A replacement name for Hymenosoma Lehmann (1957).	
Goryeocrinus	Gen. et sp. nov	Valid	Park & Lee	Ordovician (Darriwilian)	Jigunsan Formation	South Korea	A camerate crinoid belonging to the group Diplobathrida and the family Rhodocrinitidae. Genus includes new species G. pentagrammos.	
Holocrinus hagdorni	Sp. nov		Stiller	Middle Triassic (Anisian)		China	A holocrinid crinoid.	
Krommaster	Gen. et sp. nov	Valid	Reddy et al.	Devonian (Pragian to Emsian)	Baviaanskloof Formation	South Africa	A brittle star belonging to the group Oegophiurida and the family Encrinasteridae. The type species is K. spinosus.	
Micraster quebrada	Sp. nov		Schlüter et al.	Late Cretaceous (Santonian)		Spain	A sea urchin belonging to the family Micrasteridae.	
Nimchacystis	Gen. et sp. nov		Dupichaud et al.	Ordovician (Tremadocian)	Fezouata Formation	Morocco	A member of Soluta belonging to the group Syringocrinida and the family Minervaecystidae. The type species is N. agterbosi.	
Nucleolites solovjevi	Sp. nov	Valid	Kalyakin & Barsukov	Early Cretaceous (Albian)		Russia (Vladimir Oblast)	A sea urchin belonging to the group Cassiduloida and the family Nucleolitidae.	
Ophiocoma avatar	Sp. nov	Valid	Thuy & Numberger-Thuy	Late Cretaceous (Campanian)		Sweden	A brittle star, a species of Ophiocoma.	
Ophiozonella tumidasquama	Sp. nov		Gale et al.	Early Cretaceous (Albian)	Enokuchi Formation	Japan	A hemieuryalid brittle star.	
Pennsylvanicycloscapus	Nom. nov	In press	Ceccolini & Cianferoni	Carboniferous		United States (Texas)	A replacement name for Cycloscapus Moore & Jeffords (1968).	
Pleurocystites? scylla	Sp. nov	Valid	Sweeney & Sumrall	Ordovician (Sandbian)	Benbolt Formation	United States (Tennessee)	A rhombiferan belonging to the group Glyptocystitida and the family Pleurocystitidae.	
Pteraster lyddenensis	Sp. nov	Valid	Gale	Late Cretaceous (Cenomanian)	Grey Chalk Subgroup of the Chalk Group	United Kingdom	A starfish, a species of Pteraster. Published online in 2022, but the issue date is listed as February 2023.	
Pulchercrinus	Gen. et sp. nov	Valid	Müller & Ausich	Devonian	Seifen Formation	Germany	A periechocrinid camerate crinoid. The type species is P. hardyi.	
Rolliericidaris angoulensis	Sp. nov	Valid	Vadet & Nicolleau	Late Jurassic (Kimmeridgian)		France	A sea urchin belonging to the family Diplocidaridae.	
Roveacrinus aboudensis	Sp. nov	Valid	Gale	Late Cretaceous (Cenomanian)	Aït Lamine Formation	Morocco; United Kingdom	A crinoid belonging to the family Roveacrinidae.	
Roveacrinus precarinatus	Sp. nov	Valid	Gale	Late Cretaceous (Cenomanian)	Chalk Group (Grey Chalk Subgroup, Zig Zag Formation)	United Kingdom	A crinoid belonging to the family Roveacrinidae.	
Sergipecrinus	Gen. et sp. nov		Poatskievick Pierezan, Gale & Fauth	Early Cretaceous (Aptian–Albian)	Sergipe-Alagoas Basin	Brazil	A crinoid belonging to the family Roveacrinidae. Genus includes new species S. reticulatus.	
Stegophiura takaisoensis	Sp. nov	In press	Ishida et al.	Pliocene	Hatsuzaki Formation	Japan	A brittle star.	
Styracocrinus shakespearensis	Sp. nov	Valid	Gale	Late Cretaceous (Cenomanian)	Chalk Group (Grey Chalk Subgroup, Zig Zag Formation)	United Kingdom	A crinoid belonging to the family Roveacrinidae.	
Ticinocrinus moroccoensis	Sp. nov		Salamon et al.	Early Jurassic (Pliensbachian)		Morocco	A cyrtocrinid.	
Triadoleucella	Gen. et sp. nov		Ishida et al.	Late Triassic (Carnian)		Vietnam	A brittle star belonging to the group Ophioleucida. Genus includes new species T. meensis. Published online in 2022, but the issue date is listed as April 2023.	
Viridisaster	Gen. et sp. nov	Valid	Fau & Villier	Late Cretaceous (Cenomanian)		France	A stem zoroasterid. The type species is V. guerangeri.	

=== Echinoderm research ===
- Cole, Wright & Thompson (2023) experimentally confirm that ratios of seawater magnesium and calcium have a profound effect on short-term regeneration rates in extant brittle star Ophioderma cinereum, but find no evidence of a significant relationship between changes of seawater magnesium and calcium ratios and long-term changes of echinoderm biodiversity over the past 500 million years.
- Evidence from a soft robotic representation and computer simulation, interpreted as indicating that pleurocystitids were likely able to move on the sea bottom by using their muscular stem that pushed the animal forward, is presented by Desatnik et al. (2023).
- Álvarez-Armada et al. (2023) describe a specimen of Hyperoblastus reimanni preserved with structures interpreted as three larvae and a gonad, and interpret this finding as indicative of the presence of sexual dimorphism in blastoids, as well as of early evolution of internal brooding of larvae in this group.
- A study on the evolution of plate systems in the calyx of crinoids, based on data from early crinoids from Tremadocian, is published by Guensburg, Mooi & Mongiardino Koch (2023).
- A study on the ontogeny of Erisocrinus typus, based on data from fossil material representing a growth series from the Carboniferous Barnsdall Formation (Oklahoma, United States), is published by Hernandez Gomez et al. (2023).
- Gorzelak et al. (2023) report the presence of microstructure similar to the diamond-type triply periodic minimal surfaces in the skeleton of a specimen of Haplocrinites from Devonian, similar to microstructure reported in extant Protoreaster nodosus, and representing the oldest record of such microstructure in echinoderms reported to date.
- The oldest fossil material of members of the genus Percevalicrinus reported to date is described from the Lower Jurassic deposits in the western Saharan Atlas (Algeria) by Salamon et al. (2023).
- Kolata et al. (2023) report the discovery of new specimens of Cyclocystoides scammaphoris from the Ordovician Platteville Formation (Illinois), Plattin and Decorah groups (Missouri) and Lebanon Limestone (Tennessee), providing new information on the anatomy of this cyclocystoid.
- Evidence from deep-sea sediment samples interpreted as indicative of continuous record of deep-sea Atelostomata dating back to the Early Cretaceous is presented by Wiese et al. (2023).
- The youngest stenuroid asterozoan specimen reported to date is described from the Permian (Wordian-Capitanian) Las Delicias Formation (Mexico) by Sour-Tovar, Quiroz-Barroso & Martín-Medrano (2023).
- Thuy et al. (2023) report the discovery of an assemblage of brittle star microfossils from Carboniferous deep-water sediments of Oklahoma (United States), including fossils of basal representatives of Amphilepidida and Ophioscolecida, and interpret this finding as indicating that a significant part of the early diversification of the brittle star crown group might have taken place in deep-water settings.

== Hemichordates ==
Name	Novelty	Status	Authors	Age	Type locality	Location	Notes	Images
Baltograptus floianus	Sp. nov	Valid	Maletz	Ordovician		Sweden	A graptolite belonging to the family Didymograptidae.	
Baltograptus novus	Sp. nov	Valid	Maletz	Ordovician		Sweden	A graptolite belonging to the family Didymograptidae.	
Cymatograptus kristinae	Sp. nov	Valid	Maletz	Ordovician		Sweden	A graptolite belonging to the family Didymograptidae.	
Gothograptus berolinensis	Sp. nov	In press	Maletz	Silurian		Germany	A graptolite belonging to the family Retiolitidae.	
Gothograptus osgaleae	Sp. nov	In press	Maletz	Silurian		Germany	A graptolite belonging to the family Retiolitidae.	
Jishougraptus hunnebergensis	Sp. nov	Valid	Maletz	Ordovician		Sweden	A graptolite belonging to the family Kinnegraptidae/Sigmagraptidae.	
Paraplectograptus hermanni	Sp. nov	In press	Maletz	Silurian		Germany	A graptolite belonging to the family Retiolitidae.	
Rotaciurca	Gen. et sp. nov	Valid	Briggs & Mongiardino Koch	Silurian	Bertie Formation	Canada (Ontario)	A pterobranch placed in its own new family Rotaciurcidae within Cephalodiscida. The type species is R. superbus.	
Tetragraptus gerhardi	Sp. nov	Valid	Maletz	Ordovician		Sweden	A graptolite belonging to the family Phyllograptidae.	

=== Hemichordate research ===
- Nanglu et al. (2023) report the discovery of an orthocone cephalopod phragmocone from the Ordovician Fezouata Formation (Morocco) which was extensively populated by rhabdopleurid-like epibionts after the death of the cephalopod, interpreted as evidence of the use of mollusc shells as hard substrates by hemichordates dating back nearly 480 million years ago; however, their identification of purported epibionts is subsequently contested by Maletz & Gutiérrez-Marco (2024), who argue that the studied specimens might be pseudo-colonial tubaria of cephalodiscid-like epibenthic pterobranchs instead.
- Evidence from the study of the fossil record of Ordovician and Silurian graptoloids, indicating that the survivorship of the studied taxa is consistent with the neutral theory of biodiversity and that this theory can be used to formulate hypotheses on changes in ancient ecosystems, is presented by Saulsbury et al. (2023); their conclusions are subsequently contested by Johnson (2025) and reaffirmed by Saulsbury et al. (2025).
- Lopez et al. (2023) describe graptolite fossil material from the Silurian Rinconada Formation (Argentina), representing the first Pridolian graptolite assemblage from South America reported to date, and possibly providing evidence of faunal recovery interval after the Kozlowskii-Lau Event.

== Conodonts ==
=== New conodont taxa ===
Name	Novelty	Status	Authors	Age	Type locality	Location	Notes	Images
Anellodontus	Gen. et sp. nov		Rueda & Albanesi	Cambrian (Furongian)	Lampazar Formation	Argentina	Genus includes A. anellus.	
Diplognathodus porvenirensis	Sp. nov	Valid	Barrick in Barrick, Nestell & Wahlman	Carboniferous	Porvenir Formation	United States (New Mexico)		
Eognathodus grandis	Sp. nov		Lu	Devonian	Nahkaoling Formation	China	A member of the family Spathognathodontidae.	
Erismodus saltaensis	Sp. nov		Albanesi et al.	Ordovician (Darriwilian)	Santa Gertrudis Formation	Argentina		
Erraticodon aldridgei	Sp. nov		Albanesi et al.	Ordovician (Darriwilian)	Santa Gertrudis Formation	Argentina		
Gallinatodus	Gen. et sp. nov		Albanesi et al.	Ordovician (Darriwilian)	Santa Gertrudis Formation	Argentina	Genus includes new species G. elegantissimus.	
Gladigondolella luodianensis	Sp. nov		Chen et al.			China		
Icriodus alchedatensis	Sp. nov	Valid	Izokh	Devonian (Givetian)		Russia		
Icriodus edentatus	Sp. nov	In press	Yuan & Sun	Devonian (Famennian)	Xiejingsi Formation	China		
Icriodus kuzbassiensis	Sp. nov	Valid	Izokh	Devonian (Givetian)		Russia		
Icriodus lebedyankensis	Sp. nov	Valid	Izokh	Devonian (Givetian)		Russia		
Idiognathodus obstipus	Sp. nov	Valid	Barrick in Barrick, Nestell & Wahlman	Carboniferous		Brazil; United States (New Mexico)		
Idiognathodus saelensae	Sp. nov	Valid	Barrick in Barrick, Nestell & Wahlman	Carboniferous	Sandia Formation	Brazil; United States (New Mexico)		
Idiognathodus treati	Sp. nov	Valid	Barrick in Barrick, Nestell & Wahlman	Carboniferous	Sandia Formation	United States (New Mexico)		
Neognathodus darcyae	Sp. nov	Valid	Barrick in Barrick, Nestell & Wahlman	Carboniferous	Sandia Formation	United States (New Mexico)		
Neospathodus yangtzeensis	Sp. nov	Disputed	Lyu & Zhao in Lyu et al.	Early Triassic		China	A member of the family Gondolellidae belonging to the subfamily Neogondolellinae. Argued to be a senior synonym of Neospathodus bevelledi by Wu et al. (2023); on the other hand, Leu (2024) argued that N. yangtzeensis is a junior synonym of N. bevelledi.	
Novispathodus shani	Sp. nov		Lyu & Zhao in Lyu et al.	Early Triassic		China		
Pandorinellina exigua lingliensis	Ssp. nov	Valid	Lu in Lu et al.	Devonian (Lochkovian)	Nahkaoling Formation	China		
Paraserratognathus hupinaoensis	Sp. nov	Valid	Pei & Ba			China		
Pelekysgnathus arcuatus	Sp. nov	In press	Yuan & Sun	Devonian (Famennian)	Xiejingsi Formation	China	A member of Prioniodontida belonging to the family Icriodontidae.	
Pelekysgnathus ziqiuensis	Sp. nov	In press	Yuan & Sun	Devonian (Famennian)	Xiejingsi Formation	China	A member of Prioniodontida belonging to the family Icriodontidae.	
Pohlerodus	Gen. et comb. nov	Valid	Zhen	Ordovician		Canada; United States	Genus erected to substitute Texania Pohler (1994), which is a junior homonym of Texania Casey (1909). Includes species previously assigned to the genus Texania, as well as species previously assigned to the genus Fahraeusodus other than F. adentatus.	
Polygnathus communis tomurtogooi	Ssp. nov	In press	Suttner et al.	Devonian	Indert Formation	Mongolia		
Polygnathus dispersus	Sp. nov	In press	Yuan & Sun	Devonian (Famennian)	Xiejingsi Formation	China		
Polygnathus peltatus	Sp. nov	In press	Yuan & Sun	Devonian (Famennian)	Xiejingsi Formation	China		
Polygnathus sagittiformis	Sp. nov	In press	Yuan & Sun	Devonian (Famennian)	Xiejingsi Formation	China		
Polygnathus wuqingnaensis	Sp. nov		Huang et al.	Devonian (Famennian)	Wuqingna Formation	China		
Polylophodonta curvata	Sp. nov	In press	Yuan & Sun	Devonian (Famennian)	Xiejingsi Formation	China	A member of the family Polygnathidae.	
Polylophodonta nodulosa	Sp. nov	In press	Yuan & Sun	Devonian (Famennian)	Xiejingsi Formation	China	A member of the family Polygnathidae.	
Polynodosus changyangensis	Sp. nov	In press	Yuan & Sun	Devonian (Famennian)	Xiejingsi Formation	China	A member of the family Polygnathidae.	
Prioniodus antiquus	Sp. nov		Zhen et al.	Ordovician	Yinchufu Formation	China		
Pyramidens	Gen. et 2 sp. nov		Albanesi et al.	Ordovician (Darriwilian)	Santa Gertrudis Formation	Argentina	Genus includes new species P. cactus and P. spinatus.	
Siphonodella thompfelli	Sp. nov		Plotitsyn & Zhuravlev	Carboniferous (Tournaisian)		Russia		
Zentagnathus gertrudisae	Sp. nov		Albanesi et al.	Ordovician (Darriwilian)	Santa Gertrudis Formation	Argentina		
Zieglerodina? tuojiangensis	Sp. nov	Valid	Lu in Lu et al.	Devonian (Lochkovian)	Nahkaoling Formation	China		

=== Conodont research ===
- A study on the size-frequency distribution of the P1 elements of members of the genera Palmatolepis, Ancyrodella and Polygnathus during the late Frasnian and the Famennian is published by Girard et al. (2023), who don't confirm the temperature-size rule as a general rule explaining size variation in the studied fossils.
- Wu et al. (2023) report the discovery of an abundant conodont community in the Lower Triassic strata in the Zhangjiawan stratigraphic succession (Yuan'an County, Hubei, China), and interpret this finding as suggesting that the studied area might have been a refuge area for the Early Triassic conodont communities and marine ecosystem in general, as other Lower Triassic strata nearby yield only rare conodonts.
- Evidence indicating that co-occurring Late Triassic conodonts Metapolygnathus communisti and Epigondolella rigoi differed in their diets is presented by Kelz et al. (2023).
- A study on the diversity and biostratigraphy of late Norian conodont faunas from the Dashuitang and Nanshuba formations in the Baoshan area (Yunnan, China) is published by Zeng et al. (2023), who report evidence of a decline of conodont diversity during the late Norian, interpreted by the authors as the first crisis of the protracted suite of end-Triassic conodont extinctions.
- Evidence from the Kastuyama section in the Inuyama area in Honshu (Japan), argued to be indicative of the survival of the conodont species Misikella posthernsteini into the Early Jurassic, is presented by Du et al. (2023).

== Amphibians ==
=== New amphibian taxa ===
Name	Novelty	Status	Authors	Age	Type locality	Location	Notes	Images
Arenaerpeton	Gen. et sp. nov		Hart et al.	Triassic	Terrigal Formation	Australia	A chigutisaurid temnospondyl. The type species is A. supinatus.	
Compsocerops tikiensis	Sp. nov.		Chakravorti & Sengupta	Late Triassic	Tiki Formation	India	A member of Chigutisauridae.	
Funcusvermis	Gen. et sp. nov.	Valid	Kligman et al.	Late Triassic (Norian)	Chinle Formation	United States (Arizona)	A stem-caecilian. The type species is F. gilmorei.	
Gansubatrachus	Gen. et sp. nov	Valid	Zhang et al.	Early Cretaceous	Zhonggou Formation	China	A frog, possibly a basal member of Lalagobatrachia. The type species is G. qilianensis.	
Inbecetenanura	Gen. et sp. nov	Valid	Lemierre et al.	Late Cretaceous (Coniacian–Santonian)	In Beceten Formation	Niger	A frog belonging to the family Pipidae. The type species is I. ragei.	
Kuzbassia	Gen. et sp. nov	Valid	Skutschas et al.	Early Cretaceous (Aptian)	Ilek Formation	Russia (Kemerovo Oblast)	A member of the family Karauridae. The type species is K. sola.	
Lepidobatrachus dibumartinez	Sp. nov	Valid	Turazzini & Gómez	Late Miocene-Early Pliocene	Tunuyán Formation	Argentina	A ceratophryid frog, a species of Lepidobatrachus.	
Mariliabatrachus	Gen. et sp. nov		Santos, Carvalho & Zaher	Late Cretaceous (Campanian)		Brazil	A neobatrachian frog, probably with affinities with hyloids. The type species is M. navai.	
Piasimotriton	Gen. et sp. nov		Werneburg et al.	Permian	Boskovice Basin	Czech Republic	A branchiosaurid temnospondyl. The type species is P. kochovi.	
Rhigerpeton	Gen. et sp. nov		Gee, Beightol & Sidor	Triassic	Fremouw Formation	Antarctica	A lapillopsid temnospondyl. The type species is R. isbelli.	
Xerodromeus	Gen. et comb. nov	Valid	Schoch & Werneburg	Permian (possibly Sakmarian)	Niederhäslich–Schweinsdorf Formation	Germany	A branchiosaurid temnospondyl. The type species is "Branchiosaurus" gracilis Credner (1881).	

=== Amphibian research ===
- New reconstruction of the skull of Crassigyrinus scoticus is presented by Porro, Rayfield & Clack (2023).
- Pardo (2023) redescribed the anatomy of the neurocranium of Archeria crassidisca, based on data from a previously unreported partial braincase, and interprets embolomeres as more likely to be stem-tetrapods than stem-amniotes.
- A study on the morphology and ossification sequences of carpus and tarsus in basal stereospondylomorphs, providing evidence of variability in the development of the mesopodium, is published by Witzmann & Fröbisch (2023).
- Werneburg et al. (2023) describe twelve larvae of Sclerocephalus from the Permian (Asselian) Meisenheim Formation (Germany), providing new information on the earliest stages of the ontogeny of this temnospondyl.
- Groenewald et al. (2023) describe body impressions and associated swim trails of rhinesuchid temnospondyls from the Permian Karoo Basin (South Africa), providing evidence that rhinesuchids used their tails for propulsion and held their legs tucked in next to the body while swimming.
- A study comparing the probable maximum sizes that could be reached by specimens belonging to the Early Triassic temnospondyl taxa from Eastern Europe is published by Morkovin (2023), who reports the discovery of an unusually large lower jaw of Vladlenosaurus alexeyevi from the Skoba locality (Komi Republic, Russia), and argues that the size differences characteristic of the standard adult states of the studied temnospondyl taxa were likely reduced in individuals belonging to very late age categories.
- New information on the anatomy of Mastodonsaurus cappelensis is presented by Schoch et al. (2023), who report the presence of anatomical differences between M. cappelensis and the stratigraphically younger M. giganteus, indicating that the latter species adapted to feed on a wider range of prey.
- A study on the histology of large temnospondyl humeri from the Late Triassic Krasiejów site (Poland) is published by Teschner et al. (2023), who report that the humeri of Cyclotosaurus intermedius and Metoposaurus krasiejowensis might show only minor differences in morphology, making histology a valuable tool for taxonomic assignment.
- A study on the skull morphology of Koskinonodon perfectum, Dutuitosaurus ouazzoui, Metoposaurus diagnosticus and Eocyclotosaurus appetolatus, providing evidence which might be indicative of the presence of sexual dimorphism in the studied taxa, is published by Rinehart & Lucas (2023).
- Review of the fossil record of the genus Mioproteus in Southeastern Europe is published by Syromyatnikova (2023).
- Skutschas et al. (2023) describe salamander dentaries from the Lower Cretaceous Teete locality (Batylykh Formation; Sakha, Russia) representing the northernmost record of non-karaurid salamanders in the Mesozoic reported to date.
- Bourque, Stanley & Hulbert (2023) describe two partial vertebrae of a member of the genus Batrachosauroides from the Clarendonian Love Bone Bed (Florida, United States), representing the latest record of a member of this genus reported to date.
- A study on the origin of the unique body plan of frogs, based on data from extant and fossil taxa, is published by Pérez-Ben, Lires & Gómez (2023), who interpret their findings as indicative of early diversification (resulting in diversity of locomotor modes in Jurassic stem frogs) followed by period of reduced morphological diversity and repeated convergent evolution of limb proportions and locomotor capabilities, and do not consider the interpretation of the body plan of frogs as resulting from an adaptation the ancestral frogs to jumping to be strongly supported by the fossil record.
- Description of the anatomy of the metamorphosing larvae, juveniles and fully grown adults of Genibatrachus is published by Roček, Dong & Wang (2023).
- The easternmost and the youngest frog remains from the Late Cretaceous of Asia reported to date are described from the Maastrichtian dinosaur locality in the city of Blagoveshchensk (Amur Oblast, Russia) by Skutschas et al. (2023).
- Báez & Turazzini (2023) redescribe the holotype of Avitabatrachus uliana, reinterpreting the urostyle as not fully fused to the sacral vertebra, and identify additional fossil material preserved in the slab including the holotype, interpreted as likely remains of a metamorphosing tadpole of A. uliana.
- Vallejo-Pareja et al. (2023) describe the first pre-Quaternary fossils referred to Eleutherodactylus from Florida, and interpret this finding as indicating that by the Late Oligocene Eleutherodactylus was already established in North America before colonizing Central America.
- Georgalis, Prendini & Roček (2023) describe new fossil material of Thaumastosaurus from the Eocene Quercy Phosphorites Formation (France), and report evidence of diversity of morphotypes in the fossil material of Thaumastosaurus which might be indicative of the presence of cryptic taxa.
- Lemierre et al. (2023) describe a skeleton of a member of the genus Pelophylax from the lowest Oligocene of Chartres-de-Bretagne (western France), representing one of the oldest occurrences of the genus reported to date.
- Jansen et al. (2023) describe the first frog fossils from the Paleogene and early Neogene sites in Peruvian Amazonia, including fossil material of pipids, as well representatives of different lineages of Brachycephaloidea and probably also of the family Leptodactylidae.
- Klembara et al. (2023) describe a specimen of Discosauriscus pulcherrimus from the Asselian Vrchlabí Formation, representing the oldest record of this species from the Czech Republic, and a specimen of Discosauriscus cf. pulcherrimus from the Upper Carboniferous Ilmenau Formation (Germany), representing the oldest record of the genus Discosauriscus and possibly the oldest seymouriamorph reported to date.
- Bazzana-Adams et al. (2023) reconstruct the first virtual cranial endocast of Seymouria.
- Barták & Ivanov (2023) describe an exceptionally well-preserved specimen of Sauropleura scalaris (including near-complete skull) from the upper Carboniferous deposits of Nýřany (Czech Republic), providing new information on the anatomy and ontogeny of this taxon.
- Bulanov (2023) reinterprets putative bolosaurid "Bolosaurus" traati as a diadectomorph, transfers it to the genus Stephanospondylus, and considers Ambedus to be a non-diadectomorph tetrapod of uncertain affinities.
- Calábková et al. (2023) describe tracks assigned to the ichnogenus Ichniotherium from the Permian (Asselian) Boskovice Basin (Czech Republic), including tracks with morphologies similar to footprints produced by Diadectes-like diadectomorphs, but with distances between the successive imprints similar to those seen in earlier-diverging diadectomorphs.

== Synapsids ==
=== Non-mammalian synapsids ===
==== New synapsid taxa ====
Name	Novelty	Status	Authors	Age	Type locality	Location	Notes	Images
Argodicynodon	Gen. et sp. nov	Valid	Mueller et al.	Late Triassic	Tecovas Formation	United States (Texas)	A placeriine kannemeyeriiform dicynodont. The type species is A. boreni.	
Bondoceras	Gen. et sp. nov	Valid	Sidor	Permian (Guadalupian)	Madumabisa Mudstone Formation	Zambia	A burnetiid burnetiamorph. The type species is B. bulborhynchus.	
Eutheriodon	Gen. et sp. nov	Valid	Kammerer	Permian (Guadalupian)	Abrahamskraal Formation	South Africa	A scylacosaurid therocephalian. The type species is E. vandenheeveri.	
Inostrancevia africana	Sp. nov	Valid	Kammerer et al.	Permian	Balfour Formation	South Africa	A gorgonopsid.	
Jimusaria monanensis	Sp. nov	Valid	Shi & Liu	Permian	Naobaogou Formation	China	A dicynodont.	
Koksharovia	Gen. et sp. nov	Valid	Suchkova, Golubev & Shumov	Permian		Russia (Kirov Oblast)	A therocephalian. The type species is K. grechovi. Published online in 2023, but the issue date is listed as December 2022.	
Melanedaphodon	Gen. et sp. nov	Valid	Mann et al.	Carboniferous (Moscovian)	Allegheny Group	United States (Ohio)	A member of the family Edaphosauridae. The type species is M. hovaneci.	
Moschowhaitsia lidaqingi	Sp. nov	Valid	Jun & Abdala	Permian (Lopingian)	Sunan Formation	China	A whaitsiid therocephalian.	
Nierkoppia	Gen. et sp. nov	Valid	Day & Kammerer	Permian (Guadalupian)	Abrahamskraal Formation	South Africa	A proburnetiine burnetiamorph. The type species is N. brucei.	
Pembecephalus	Gen. et sp. nov	Valid	Sidor	Permian (Lopingian)	Usili Formation	Tanzania	A burnetiid burnetiamorph. The type species is P. litumbaensis.	
Santagnathus	Gen. et sp. nov		Schmitt et al.	Late Triassic (Carnian)	Santa Maria Formation (Hyperodapedon Assemblage Zone)	Brazil	A cynodont in the family Traversodontidae. The type species is S. mariensis	
Woznikella	Gen. et sp. nov	Valid	Szczygielski & Sulej	Late Triassic (Carnian–?Norian)	Grabowa Formation	Poland; Germany	A dicynodont closely related to the family Stahleckeriidae. The type species is W. triradiata.	

==== Synapsid research ====
- A study on the evolution of the dentary size in non-mammalian synapsids is published by Harano & Asahara (2023), who find evidence indicative of an evolutionary trend for enlargement of dentary relative to the overall lower jaw size across all non-mammalian synapsids, regardless of their relation to mammals, but find no evidence for an evolutionary trend in dentary enlargement at the expense of the postdentary bones.
- Studies on the evolution of the forelimb and hindlimb musculature of synapsids are published by Bishop & Pierce (2023).
- A study on the ecomorphology of synapsids throughout their evolutionary history is published by Hellert et al. (2023), who find carnivory to be the ancestral dietary regime of major synapsid radiations, but also find that small body size was established as the common ancestral state of radiations as late as in the Late Triassic, near the origin of Mammaliaformes, and report the presence of derived traits in the ancestors of major synapsid radiations.
- Calábková et al. (2023) describe tracks assignable to the ichnogenus Dimetropus and produced by "pelycosaur"-grade synapsids from the Permian (Asselian) Padochov and Letovice formations (Boskovice Basin, Czech Republic), including a specimen with preserved skin impressions, and providing new information on the diversity of the earliest Permian equatorial tetrapod faunas.
- Maho, Bevitt & Reisz (2023) describe fossil material of Varanops brevirostris from the Dolese Brother Limestone Quarry (Oklahoma, United States), confirming the presence of this taxon at Richards Spur, and interpret this finding as indicating that, although less abundant than Cacops and Acheloma, V. brevirostris was not as rare taxon as previously thought.
- Gônet et al. (2023) present a model which can be used to determine posture from humeral parameters in extant mammals, and use it to infer a sprawling posture for Dimetrodon natalis.
- Bazzana-Adams, Evans & Reisz (2023) describe the brain and inner ear of Dimetrodon loomisi, and interpret their findings as indicating that Dimetrodon was sensitive to a greater range of frequencies beyond the ultra-low-frequency ground-borne sounds anticipated in previous estimates.
- Partial humerus of a synapsid of uncertain affinities, with anatomical traits blurring the distinction between the "pelycosaur"-grade synapsids and therapsids, is described from the Permian (Capitanian) Main Karoo Basin (South Africa) by Bishop et al. (2023).
- An almost complete skull of Pampaphoneus biccai, providing new information on the anatomy of this species, is described from the Permian Rio do Rasto Formation (Brazil) by Santos et al. (2023).
- Benoit, Norton & Jirah (2023) describe the maxillary canal of Jonkeria truculenta, reporting that is structure shares more similarities with the maxillary canal of the tapinocephalid Moschognathus than with that of Anteosaurus.
- Rubidge, Day & Benoit (2023) report the first discovery of the fossil material of Colobodectes cluveri from the Grootfontein Member of the Abrahamskraal Formation (South Africa), providing correlation between strata of the Abrahamskraal Formation from the northwestern, western and southwestern part of the Karoo Basin.
- Laaß & Kaestner (2023) report the presence of a system of turbinal ridges for attachment of respiratory and olfactory turbinates (strongly resembling the mammalian condition) in the skull of Kawingasaurus fossilis, and interpret this finding as supporting a convergent origin of endothermy in dicynodonts, possibly influenced by their fossorial habitat.
- New information on the anatomy of Cistecephalus microrhinus is presented by Macungo et al. (2023), who interpret cistecephalids as probable ectotherms, and argue that purported turbinals such as those reported in Kawingasaurus fossilis by Laaß & Kaestner (2023) are probably lines left by sediment infilling of the skull cavity.
- Sidor, Mann & Angielczyk (2023) report the discovery of the fossil material of the gorgonopsian Gorgonops sp. and the dicynodont Endothiodon sp. from the Permian Madumabisa Mudstone Formation, indicating that the stratigraphic range of vertebrate-bearing horizons in southern Zambia includes not only Guadalupian Tapinocephalus Assemblage Zone-equivalent strata, but also Lopingian Endothiodon Assemblage Zone-age strata.
- Bendel et al. (2023) describe a nearly complete skeleton of Gorgonops torvus from the Permian Endothiodon Assemblage Zone of the Karoo Basin (South Africa), and interpret the anatomy of the studied specimen as indicating that G. torvus was likely ambush predator, able to chase its prey over short distances.
- The first Permian tetrapod fossils from the Omingonde Formation, Namibia are described and identified as a dicynodont and a gorgonopsian therapsids by Mocke et al. (2023), comparable to Tropidostoma and Lycaenops, respectively.
- The holotypes of Dicynodon ingens and Scymnosaurus warreni are re-located and redescribed by Groenewald & Kammerer (2023), who re-identify them as specimens of Daptocephalus leoniceps and Moschorhinus kitchingi, respectively.
- The craniomandibular anatomy of the therocephalian Olivierosuchus is re-described by Gigliotti et al. (2023), including for the first time the braincase and inner ear, revealing similar neuroanatomy to other non-mammalian therapsids.
- A historical and taxonomic review of the Karoo and global record of non-mammalian cynodonts is published by Abdala et al. (2023).
- Redescription of the holotype of Nythosaurus larvatus is published by Pusch et al. (2023), who interpret N. larvatus as a taxon distinct from Thrinaxodon liorhinus.
- Kulik (2023) compares femoral histology of two specimens of Scalenodon angustifrons of the same size, report evidence of skeletal maturity in one of the studied specimens, and interprets her findings as indicative of a flexible growth strategy in S. angustifrons.
- A study on the dentition of Charruodon tetracuspidatus is published by Hoffmann, Ribeiro & de Andrade (2023), who interpret the holotype specimen as representing an early ontogenetic stage, and consider C. tetracuspidatus to be a nomen dubium.
- Hoffmann, de Andrade & Martinelli (2023) redescribe the skeletal anatomy of "Probelesodon" kitchingi, and transfer this species to the genus Chiniquodon.
- Description of new lower jaw remains of Agudotherium gassenae from the Late Triassic of Brazil, providing new information on the anatomy of this taxon, and a study on its phylogenetic affinities is published by Kerber, Pretto & Müller (2023), who recover A. gassenae as the sister taxon of Prozostrodontia.
- Stefanello et al. (2023) describe a new, complete and exceptionally well-preserved skull of Prozostrodon brasiliensis from the Upper Triassic strata in Brazil, and name a new endemic clade of South American cynodonts – Prozostrodontidae, including Prozostrodon and Pseudotherium.
- A study on the endocranial anatomy of Prozostrodon brasiliensis and Therioherpeton cargnini is published by Kerber et al. (2023).
- Lund, Norton & Benoit (2023) describe the postcranial, basicranial and palatal morphology of Diarthrognathus broomi.
- A study on the evolution of cynodont skulls is published by Lautenschlager et al. (2023), who find no evindence for an increase in cranial strength and biomechanical performance during the cynodont–mammalian transition.
- A study on tooth replacement pattern and deciduous teeth in Haldanodon exspectatus is published by Martin & Schultz (2023), who interpret the fossil material of Peraiocynodon inexpectatus, P. major and Cyrtlatherium canei as likely to be docodont milk teeth.
- Averianov, Lopatin & Leshchinskiy (2023) reinterpret one of the supposed lower premolars of Sibirotherium rossicum as the first molariform, and consider S. rossicum to have five rather than six lower premolars.

== Other animals ==
=== Other new animal taxa ===
Name	Novelty	Status	Authors	Age	Type locality	Location	Notes	Images
Acanthochaetetes reitneri	Sp. nov	Valid	Sánchez-Beristain, Rodrigo & Schlagintweit	Early Cretaceous (Aptian-Albian)	Tuburan Limestone	Philippines	A chaetetid demosponge.	
Aetholicopalla grandipora	Sp. nov	Valid	Luzhnaya et al.	Cambrian		Mongolia	A sponge of uncertain affinities.	
Akrophyllas	Gen. et comb. nov	Valid	Grimes et al.	Ediacaran	Ediacara Member of the Rawnsley Quartzite	Australia	An arboreomorph. The type species is "Rangea" longa Glaessner & Wade (1966).	
Archiasterella anchoriformis	Sp. nov	Valid	Peng et al.	Cambrian (Wuliuan)	Kaili Formation	China	A chancelloriid.	
Calliospongia	Gen. et sp. nov	Valid	Chen et al.	Cambrian Stage 3	Chiungchussu Formation	China	A sponge, possibly a member of Silicea. The type species is C. chunchengia.	
Chancelloria zhaoi	Sp. nov	Valid	Peng et al.	Cambrian (Wuliuan)	Kaili Formation	China	A chancelloriid.	
Cretacimermis	Gen. et 9 sp. nov	Valid	Poinar in Luo et al.	Cretaceous	Burmese amber Lebanese amber	Lebanon; Myanmar	A collective genus erected for fossil nematodes belonging to the family Mermithidae. The name was used in earlier publications, but the taxon was formally named in 2023. Genus includes new species C. incredibilis Luo & Poinar, C. calypta Luo & Poinar, C. adelphe Luo & Poinar, C. directa Luo & Poinar, C. longa Luo & Poinar, C. perforissi Luo & Poinar, C. manicapsoci Luo & Poinar, C psoci Luo & Poinar and C. cecidomyiae Luo & Poinar, as well as "Heleidomermis" libani Poinar et al. (1994), C. chironomae Poinar (2011), C. aphidophilus Poinar (2017) and C. protus Poinar & Buckley (2006).	
Cyathophycus balori	Sp. nov		Botting, Muir & Doyle	Carboniferous (Pennsylvanian)		Ireland	A reticulosan sponge.	
Didemnum cassianum	Comb. nov	Valid	Paulsen & Thibault	Early Jurassic (Hettangian-Sinemurian)	"Llanbdr (Mochras Farm)" core	United Kingdom	An Ascidiacea Tunicate. The type species is "Tetralithus cassianus" by Jafar (1983)	
Ercaivermis	Gen. et sp. nov	Valid	Wang et al.	Cambrian Stage 3	Yu'anshan Formation	China	A member of Priapulida. The type species is E. sparios.	
Floraconformis	Gen. et sp. nov	Valid	Goñi et al.	Cambrian Stage 3	Erkhelnuur Formation	Mongolia	A palaeoscolecid. The type species is F. egiinensis.	
Gaoloufangchaeta	Gen. et sp. nov	Valid	Zhao, Li & Selden	Cambrian Stage 4	Wulongqing Formation	China	A polychaete. The type species is G. bifurcus.	
Gzhelistella	Gen. et sp. nov	Valid	Davydov et al.	Carboniferous (Gzhelian)	Kosherovo Formation	Russia (Moscow Oblast)	A calcareous sponge. The type species is G. cornigera. Published online in 2024, but the issue date is listed as December 2023.	
Iotuba	Gen. et sp. nov		Zhang & Smith in Zhang, Smith & Ren	Cambrian Stage 3	Yu'anshan Formation	China	Probably an annelid belonging to the group Sedentaria, related to the families Flabelligeridae and Acrocirridae. The type species is I. chengjiangensis. The name was used in earlier publications, but the taxon wasn't formally described before 2023.	
Kalpinella fragilis	Sp. nov	Valid	Świerczewska-Gładysz & Jurkowska	Late Cretaceous (Campanian)		Poland	A demosponge belonging to the family Phymatellidae.	
Liexiscolex	Gen. et sp. nov		Liu & Huang in Liu et al.	Ordovician	Madaoyu Formation	China	A palaeoscolecid. Genus includes new species L. hunanensis.	
Llwygarua	Gen. et sp. nov	Valid	Botting & Muir	Ordovician (Darriwilian)	Gilwern Volcanic Formation	United Kingdom	A spoon worm belonging to the family Thalassematidae. The type species is L. suzannae.	
Longibirotula	Gen. et sp. nov	Valid	Pronzato & Manconi in Samant et al.	Late Cretaceous–Paleocene	Naskal intertrappean beds	India	A demosponge belonging to the family Palaeospongillidae. The type species is L. antiqua Manconi & Samant.	
Megasiphon	Gen. et sp. nov	Valid	Nanglu et al.	Cambrian (Drumian)	Marjum Formation	United States (Utah)	A tunicate. The type species is M. thylakos.	
Mobulavermis	Gen. et sp. nov	Valid	McCall	Cambrian	Pioche Shale	United States (Nevada)	A lobopodian belonging to the family Kerygmachelidae. The type species is M. adustus.	
Monoshanites	Gen. et sp. nov	Valid	Demidenko	Cambrian	Bayangol Formation	Mongolia	Sclerites of an animal of uncertain affinities, belonging to the family Siphogonuchitidae. The type species is M. dentatus.	
Neovermilia gundstrupensis	Sp. nov	Valid	Kočí, Milàn & Jäger	Paleocene (Selandian)	Kerteminde Marl Formation	Denmark	An annelid belonging to the family Serpulidae.	
Palaeoquadrum	Gen. et sp. nov	Valid	Paulsen & Thibault	Early Jurassic (Sinemurian)	"Llanbdr (Mochras Farm)" core	United Kingdom	An Ascidiacea Tunicate. the type species is P. ullmanni	
Palaeosmenospongia	Gen. et sp. nov		Wu & Reitner in Wu et al.	Early Triassic		China	A keratose sponge. The type species is P. kejiaoensis.	
Petriterastroma	Gen. et sp. nov	Valid	Jeon & Kershaw in Jeon et al.	Ordovician (Katian)	Beiguoshan Formation	China	A clathrodictyid stromatoporoid. The type species is P. exililamellatum.	
Phakeloides	Gen. et sp. nov	Valid	Wierzbowski & Błażejowski	Devionian (Famennian)		Poland	A member of Chaetognatha of uncertain affinities. The type species is P. polonicus.	
Pickettispongia	Gen. et comb. nov	Valid	Pisera, Bitner & Fromont	Eocene	Pallinup Formation	Australia	A demosponge belonging to the family Phymaraphiniidae. The type species is "Discodermia" tabelliformis Chapman & Crespin (1934).	
Plexodictyon xibeiense	Sp. nov	Valid	Jeon in Jeon et al.	Ordovician (Katian)	Beiguoshan Formation	China	A clathrodictyid stromatoporoid.	
Ptilospongia	Gen. et sp. nov		Li & Reitner	Ordovician	Kaochiapien Formation	China	A demosponge belonging to the family Bubaridae. The type species is P. hemisphaeroidalis.	
Quadrifolium	Gen. et sp. nov	Valid	Paulsen & Thibault	Early Jurassic (Sinemurian)	"Llanbdr (Mochras Farm)" core	United Kingdom	An Ascidiacea Tunicate. The type species is Q. hesselboi	
Rotulispira apiaria	Sp. nov	Valid	McNamara	Late Cretaceous (Santonian to Campanian)	Toolonga Calcilutite	Australia	A polychaete belonging to the family Serpulidae.	
Rotulispira glauerti	Sp. nov	Valid	McNamara	Late Cretaceous (Santonian to Campanian)	Gingin Chalk	Australia	A polychaete belonging to the family Serpulidae.	
Rotulispira protea	Sp. nov	Valid	McNamara	Late Cretaceous (Maastrichtian)	Miria Formation	Australia	A polychaete belonging to the family Serpulidae.	
Shaihuludia	Gen. et sp. nov		Kimmig et al.	Cambrian (Wuliuan)	Langston Formation	United States (Utah)	A polychaete. The type species is S. shurikeni.	
Simplexodictyon conspicus	Sp. nov	Valid	Jeon & Kershaw in Jeon et al.	Ordovician (Katian)	Beiguoshan Formation	China	A stromatoporellid stromatoporoid.	
Styliolina giga	Sp. nov		Vinn et al.	Silurian		Estonia	A member of Tentaculita.	
Teganium avalonensis	Sp. nov	Valid	Botting, Muir & Ma	Ordovician	Gilwern Volcanic Formation	United Kingdom	A hexactinellid sponge belonging to the family Teganiidae.	
Twertupia	Gen. et comb. nov	Valid	Pisera, Bitner & Fromont	Eocene	Pallinup Formation	Australia	A demosponge belonging to the family Phymaraphiniidae. The type species is "Thamnospongia" subglabra Chapman & Crespin (1934).	
Ursactis	Gen. et sp. nov	Valid	Osawa, Caron & Gaines	Cambrian (Wuliuan)	Burgess Shale	Canada (British Columbia)	A polychaete. The type species is U. comosa.	
Webbyites felix	Sp. nov		Muir & Gutiérrez-Marco	Ordovician (Tremadocian)	Fezouata Formation	Morocco	An animal of uncertain affinity, might be a benthic graptolite or a hydrozoan.	

=== Other animal research ===
- A study on the paleobiology of Eoandromeda octobrachiata is published by Botha et al. (2023), who interpret E. octobrachiata as a benthic, sessile, radially symmetrical organism, and consider it unlikely that E. octobrachiata was a stem-ctenophore.
- A study aiming to test the hypothesized feeding modes of Pectinifrons abyssalis is published by Darroch et al. (2023), who interpret their findings as supporting neither a suspension feeding or osmotrophic feeding habit, and indicating that rangeomorph fronds were organs adapted for oxygen uptake and gas exchange, rather than feeding.
- New information on the paleobiology of Culmofrons plumosa, based on data from specimens from the Trepassey Formation (Canada), is presented by Pasinetti & McIlroy (2023), who interpret rangeomorph impressions observed in Culmofrons as likely bundles of branches in the process of separating from the organism, potentially indicating that rangeomorphs had true modularity and the ability to separate modules as an asexual reproductive strategy.
- Purported fossil material of Dickinsonia reported from the Bhimbetka rock shelters in rocks of the Maihar Sandstone (India) is reinterpreted as an impression resulting from decay of a modern beehive by Meert et al. (2023).
- A study aiming to assess the validity of species distinctions in the genus Dickinsonia is published by Evans et al. (2023), who interpret their findings as indicative of the presence of two distinct species from South Australia, D. costata and D. tenuis.
- New information on the body plan of Dickinsonia, based on data from the fossil material from the southeastern White Sea area (Russia), is presented by Ivantsov & Zakrevskaya (2023), who interpret the anatomy of Dickinsonia as indicative of its affinity to the urbilaterian.
- Evidence indicative of the impact of oxygen expansion driven by sea-level oscillations on the speciation of early Cambrian reef-building archaeocyaths from the Siberian Craton is presented by Zhuravlev, Wood & Bowyer (2023).
- Evidence from computational fluid dynamics simulations of digital models of Archaeolynthus porosus and Favilynthus mellifer, interpreted as indicating that the studied archaeocyaths could not have functioned effectively as predominantly passive suspension feeders but rather had to use active suspension feeding methods, is presented by Gibson et al. (2023).
- Yun et al. (2023) describe new fossil material of Hyalosinica archaica from the Cambrian Niutitang Formation (China), indicating that H. archaica developed a long stalk used to lift the main body above the sediment surface and reach more oxic water, and interpret H. archaica as a member of the stem group of Hexactinellida.
- Łukowiak et al. (2023) report the discovery of a diverse assemblage of Miocene sponge spicules from the Guadalquivir Basin (Spain), including sponges with affinities to extant taxa from the Indo-Pacific and Japanese waters, and interpret changes of distribution of the studied sponge taxa as likely resulting from the isolation of the Mediterranean and the Messinian salinity crisis.
- Fossil material of Nenoxites from the Ediacaran Khatyspyt Formation (Russia), originally interpreted as trace fossils providing evidence of early bioturbation, is argued to more likely represent body fossil coquina of Shaanxilithes-like tubular organisms by Psarras et al. (2023), who interpret Shaanxilithes-type body fossils as possible total group eumetazoans.
- Yun, Reitner & Zhang (2023) describe new, well-preserved fossil material of the chancelloriid Dimidia simplex from the Cambrian Yu'anshan Formation (China), and consider Dimidia to be a taxon distinct from Allonnia.
- Yang et al. (2023) reinterpret putative Cambrian bryozoan Protomelission as an early dasycladalean green alga, and conclude that there are no unequivocal bryozoans of Cambrian age; however, in a subsequent study Xiang et al. (2023) present new information on the morphology of Protomelission, and consider it to be a scleritome of Cambroclavus, which in turn is considered by the authors to be a probable epitheliozoan-grade eumetazoan like the contemporaneous chancelloriids, unrelated to bryozoans or to dasycladalean algae.
- A study on the body architecture of Xianguangia sinica is published by Zhao, Hou & Cong (2023), who interpret the putative "column" part of its body as formed by 18 tentacle-sheath complexes, and interpret X. sinica as a possible stem-ctenophore related to Dinomischus and Daihua.
- A specimen of the Ordovian hyolith Elegantilites custos with an operculum showing regeneration after non-lethal predatory attack is described by Fatka, Valent & Budil (2023).
- Parry et al. (2023) describe fossil material of Plumulites tafennaensis from the Ordovician (Katian) Upper Tiouririne Formation (Morocco), including aberrant shell plates interpreted as resulting from healed injuries, and consider the soft tissue that secreted the shell plate to be similar in morphology and size relative to the body to that seen in scaleworm elytra.
- Putative anostracan crustacean Gilsonicaris rhenanus is reinterpreted as a polychaete by Gueriau, Parry & Rabet (2023).
- New cycloneuralian microfossils, preserving a musculature system interpreted as indicative of a phylogenetic relationships with scalidophorans and possibly priapulans, are described from the Cambrian Kuanchuanpu Formation (China) by Zhang et al. (2023).
- Putative early leech from the Silurian Brandon Bridge Formation (Waukesha Biota; Wisconsin, United States) is considered to be a member of Cycloneuralia of uncertain affinities by Braddy, Gass & Tessler (2023).
- Wu, Pisani & Donoghue (2023) study the interrelationship between main groups of Panarthropoda, attempting to determine whether morphological datasets from the studies of extant and fossil panarthropod relationships published by Legg, Sutton & Edgecombe (2013), Yang et al. (2016) and Aria, Zhao & Zhu (2021) can discriminate statistically between competing Tactopoda, Lobopodia and Protarthopoda hypotheses, and question the accuracy of morphology-based phylogenies of Panarthropoda that include fossil species.
- Kihm et al. (2023) compare the morphology of tardigrades and Cambrian lobopodians, and argue that ancestral tardigrades likely had a Cambrian lobopodian–like morphology and shared most recent ancestry with the luolishaniids.
- New fossil material of Rotadiscus grandis is reported from the Cambrian Chengjiang biota from Yunnan (China) by Li et al. (2023), who recover Rotadiscus as a stem-ambulacrarian, and argue that such deuterostome traits as post-anal region, gill bars and a U-shaped gut evolved through convergence rather than shared ancestry.
- Yang et al. (2023) report the discovery a previously unrecognized structure between the third and fourth segments of the posterior section of the body of weakly sclerotized vetulicolians, and interpret this structure as an internal organ, possibly used for reproduction, excretion or digestion.
- Yang et al. (2023) report the discovery of the fossil material of Herpetogaster collinsi from the Cambrian Balang Formation (China), representing the first record of this species from Gondwana, and interpret the distribution of H. collinsi in both Laurentia and Gondwana, coupled with its phylogenetic placement at the base of the ambulacrarian tree, as suggesting that the last common ancestor of the ambulacrarians might have already had a planktonic larval stage (or that such larvae developed multiple times within the Ambulacraria), which would have permitted dispersal over long distances.
- Claims of the presence of cellular cartilages, fibrillin and subchordal rod in yunnanozoan fossils made by Tian et al. (2022) are contested by He et al. (2023) and Zhang & Pratt (2023).
- Redescription of the holotype of Chamasaurus dolichognathus is published by Jenkins, Meyer & Bhullar (2023).
- A study on the anatomy and affinities of Tullimonstrum gregarium is published by Mikami et al. (2023), who interpret T. gregarium as more likely to be a non-vertebrate chordate or a protostome than a vertebrate.

== Other organisms ==
=== Other new organisms ===
Name	Novelty	Status	Authors	Age	Type locality	Location	Notes	Images
Baltisphaeridium razii	Sp. nov		Ghavidel-Syooki & Piri-Kangarshahi	Ordovician	Lashkarak Formation	Iran	An acritarch.	
Birrindudutuba	Gen. et sp. nov		Riedman et al.	Late Paleoproterozoic	Blue Hole Formation	Australia	A eukaryotic microfossil. The type species is B. brigandinia.	
Cambrocoryne	Gen. et sp. nov	Valid	Peel	Cambrian (Wulian)	Henson Gletscher Formation	Greenland	An organism of uncertain affinities, with similarities to wiwaxiid and annelid sclerites, thelodont scales and the foraminiferan Lagena. The type is species C. lagenamorpha.	
Cangwuella	Gen. et sp. nov		Wang et al.	Devonian (?Pragian-Emsian)	Cangwu Formation	China	A member of Arcellinida of uncertain affinities. The type species is C. ampulliformis.	
Concavaesphaera	Gen. et sp. nov		Liu et al.	Cambrian		China	An acritarch, possibly a representative of an extinct group of early multicellular eukaryotes. The type species C. ornata.	
Cyathochitina gerdkuhensis	Sp. nov		Ghavidel-Syooki & Piri-Kangarshahi	Ordovician	Lashkarak Formation	Iran	A chitinozoan.	
Dahisphaera	Gen. et sp. nov		Xian, Eriksson & Zhang	Cambrian		Canada; China	An organism of uncertain affinities, possibly an alga. The type species is D. plana.	
Filinexum	Gen. et sp. nov		Riedman et al.	Late Paleoproterozoic	Blue Hole Formation	Australia	A eukaryotic microfossil. The type species is F. torsivum.	
Grandilingulata	Gen. et sp. nov		Chen et al.	Early Mesoproterozoic	Gaoyuzhuang Formation	China	A multicellular eukaryote of uncertain affinities. The type species is G. qianxiensis.	
Hocosphaeridium crispum	Sp. nov	Valid	Vorob'eva & Petrov	Ediacaran and early Cambrian	Ura Formation	Russia	An acritarch.	
Kamolineata	Gen. et comb. nov		Riedman et al.	Late Paleoproterozoic and Mesoproterozoic	Dzhelindukon Formation	Australia; Democratic Republic of the Congo; Russia	A eukaryotic microfossil. The type species is "Valeria" elongata Nagovitsin (2009).	
Kuqaia scanicus	Sp. nov		Peng et al.	Early Jurassic (Pliensbachian)	Rya Formation	Sweden	A palynomorph. Argued to be a possible ephippium of a cladoceran by Peng et al. (2023), but this interpretation was rejected by Van Damme (2023).	
Limbunyasphaera	Gen. et sp. nov		Riedman et al.	Late Paleoproterozoic	Blue Hole Formation	Australia	A eukaryotic microfossil. The type species is L. operculata.	
Navifusa alborzensis	Sp. nov		Ghavidel-Syooki & Piri-Kangarshahi	Ordovician	Lashkarak Formation	Iran	An acritarch.	
Orthosphaeridium iranense	Sp. nov		Ghavidel-Syooki & Piri-Kangarshahi	Ordovician	Lashkarak Formation	Iran	An acritarch.	
Parmoligocena	Gen. et sp. nov	Valid	Kaczmarska & Ehrman	Oligocene (Rupelian)	Menilite Formation	Poland	A member of Parmales. The type species is P. janusii.	
Pentalaminamorpha	Gen. et sp. nov	Valid	Kaczmarska & Ehrman	Oligocene (Rupelian)	Menilite Formation	Poland	A parmalean-like eukaryote of uncertain affinities. The type species is P. radiata.	
Podoliagraptus	Gen. et sp. nov	Disputed	Skompski et al.	Silurian		Ukraine	A graptolite-like form of uncertain affinities. The type species is P. algaeoides. Argued by LoDuca (2024) to actually represent the uppermost siphons of mature thalli of the alga Voronocladus dryganti.	
Qinlingisphaera	Gen. et sp. nov		Xian, Eriksson & Zhang	Cambrian		Canada; China	An organism of uncertain affinities, possibly an alga. The type species is Q. conica.	
Shaanisphaera	Gen. et sp. nov		Xian, Eriksson & Zhang	Cambrian		China; Russia	An organism of uncertain affinities, possibly an alga. The type species is S. spinosa.	
Siphonoseptum	Gen. et sp. nov		Riedman et al.	Late Paleoproterozoic and Mesoproterozoic		Australia; China; Canada?	A eukaryotic microfossil. The type species is S. bombycinum.	
Tuanshanzia linearis	Sp. nov		Chen et al.	Early Mesoproterozoic	Gaoyuzhuang Formation	China	A multicellular eukaryote of uncertain affinities.	
Tuanshanzia parva	Sp. nov		Chen et al.	Early Mesoproterozoic	Gaoyuzhuang Formation	China	A multicellular eukaryote of uncertain affinities.	
Tymkivia	Gen. et sp. nov	Valid	Martyshyn	Ediacaran	Studenitsa Formation	Ukraine	An organism of uncertain affinities, possibly a benthic plant with similarities to green algae or a fossil of the polyp stage of a medusozoan. The type species is T. primitiva.	
Xiamalingella	Gen. et sp. nov	Valid	Tang et al.	Mesoproterozoic	Xiamaling Formation	China	An organism with similarities to cyanobacteria. The type species is X. sideria.	

=== Other organism research ===
- A study on the taphonomy of fossils of 2.1-billion-years-old soft-bodied organisms from the Franceville basin (Gabon) is published by Ngwal'ghoubou Ikouanga et al. (2023).

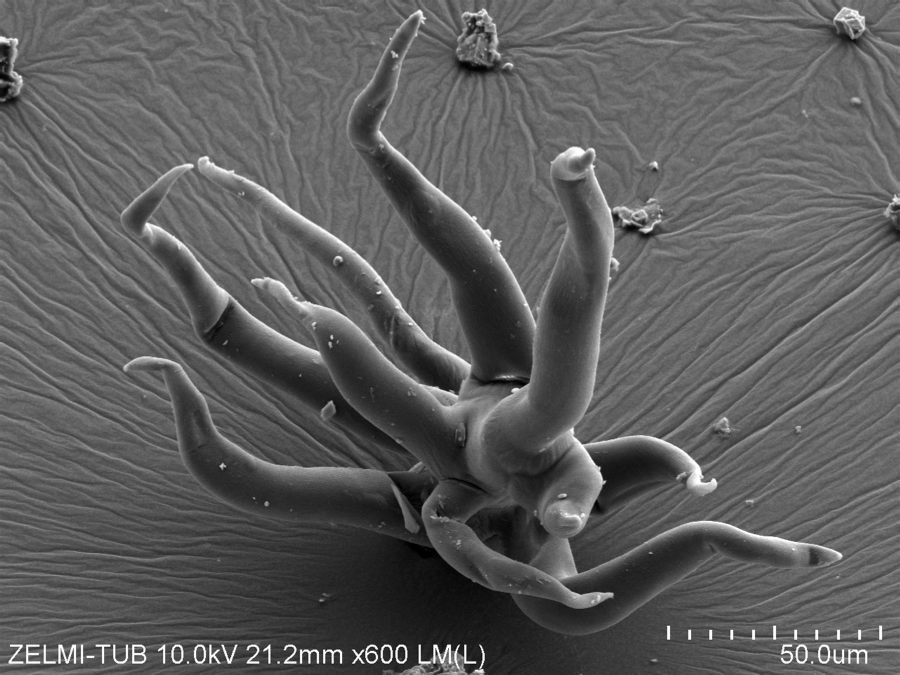
A specimen of the Volyn Biota

- Franz et al. (2023) describe the morphology and the internal structure of at least 1.5-billion-years-old organisms from the Volyn pegmatite field associated with the Korosten Pluton (Ukraine), reporting the presence of a large variation of different types of filaments in the studied organisms, and providing evidence of the presence of fungi-like organisms and continental deep biosphere by 1.5 billion years ago.
- Hoshino et al. (2023) study the distribution of hopanoid C-2 methyltransferase in the bacterial domain, and interpret their findings as indicating that Alphaproteobacteria evolved hopanoid C-2 methyltransferase around 750 million years ago, thus re-establishing 2-methylhopanes as cyanobacterial biomarkers before 750 Ma.
- Strullu-Derrien et al. (2023) describe new fossil material of nostocalean cyanobacteria from the Devonian Rhynie chert, interpret both new fossils and similar specimens that were already known (including fossils of Kidstoniella fritschii and Rhyniella vermiformis) as fossil material of a single species Langiella scourfieldii that belonged to the family Hapalosiphonaceae and thrived in soils, freshwater and hot springs like its extant relatives.
- Li et al. (2023) describe new fossil material of Horodyskia from the Tonian Shiwangzhuang and Jiuliqiao formations (China), and reconstruct Horodyskia as a colonial organism composed of a chain of organic-walled vesicles that likely represent multinucleated cells of early eukaryotes.
- Li et al. (2023) interpret discoidal fossils from the Tonian Jiuliqiao Formation (Anhui, China) as detached holdfasts of the worm-like annulated tubular fossils from the same formation.
- Evidence of widespread presence of pyritized spherical microorganisms (likely coccoid bacterial body fossils) on the surface of invertebrate fossils from the Lower Cretaceous Crato Formation (Brazil) is presented by Barling, Saleh & Ma (2023).
- Bryłka et al. (2023) reevaluate purported earliest fossils of diatoms from the Early and Middle Jurassic, and interpret them as unlikely to be fossil material of diatoms.
- Evidence of the impact of nutrient availability gradient on changes in the calcareous dinocyst assemblages is reported from the Turonian Dubivtsi Formation (Ukraine) by Ciurej, Dubicka & Poberezhskyy (2023).
- A study on the Cretaceous benthic foraminiferal assemblages from the Western Interior Seaway is published by Bryant, Meehan & Belanger (2023), who find no genera, guilds or morphotypes unique to cold seeps, and find assemblages from cold seeps to be overall more similar to offshore assemblages than nearshore ones, but also report that the composition of the studied assemblages did reflect the environmental differences present at seeps.
- A study on the fossil record of the planktonic foraminifera, interpreted as indicating that a modern-style latitudinal diversity gradient for these foraminifera arose only 15 million years ago, is published by Fenton et al. (2023).
- A study on the geographical distribution of the ecological and morphological groups of fossil planktonic foraminifera, interpreted as indicative of a global shift towards the Equator over the past 8 million years in response to the late Cenozoic temperature changes related to the polar ice sheet formation, is published by Woodhouse et al. (2023).
- Fonseca et al. (2023) describe possible fossil material of choanoflagellates from the Upper Cretaceous (Cenomanian–Turonian) Capas Blancas Formation (Spain), representing the first putative occurrence of choanoflagellates in the fossil record reported to date.

== History of life in general ==
- Brocks et al. (2023) report the discovery of abundant protosteroids in sedimentary rocks of mid-Proterozoic age, and interpret this finding as evidence of the existence of a widespread and abundant biota of protosterol-producing bacteria and stem-group eukaryotes, living in aquatic environments from at least 1,640 to around 800 million years ago.
- Choudhuri et al. (2023) describe exceptionally-preserved bedding plane structures from the 1.6-billion-years-old Chorhat Sandstone (India), and argue that some of the studied structures were more likely to be created by movement through a microbiota-rich surficial sediment than by passive migration of any inorganic or organic masses under influence of an external force.
- Possible body and trace fossils, representing the oldest potential macrofossils from the Nama Group, are described from the lower Mara Member of the lower Dabis Formation (Tsaus Mountains, Namibia) by Wood et al. (2023), who interpret the studied fossils as remains of holdover soft-bodied taxa that appeared prior to the appearance of tubular and biomineralized animals.
- A study on the timing and environmental context of the earliest biotic assemblage from the Nama Group, based on data from the Dabis Formation (Tsaus Mountains, Namibia), is published by Bowyer et al. (2023), who interpret their findings as indicating that the evolution of skeletonization and the first appearance of Cloudina happened in open marine carbonate settings and might have been driven by major sea level lowstands.
- Kolesnikov et al. (2023) report the discovery of the fossil material of Ediacara-type soft-bodied organisms, including palaeopascichnids, arboreomorphs, chuariomorphids, microbial colonies, from the Dzhezhim Formation of the Timan Range (Komi Republic, Russia).
- Revision of the Ediacaran fossils and pseudofossils from the Ura Formation (Patom Basin; Russia) is published by Petrov & Vorob'eva (2023).
- Mussini & Dunn (2023) interpret the gradual but escalatory upping of ecological pressure resulting from evolutionary innovations such as bioturbation, predation and reef building as likely to be the most significant cause of the replacement of the Ediacaran biota by Phanerozoic biotas dominated by crown eumetazoans, and argue that changes to the originally homogenous distribution of resources in the benthos initiated by the Ediacaran biota itself might have driven the origins of bilaterians, their evolutionary innovations and ultimately their takeover.
- Servais et al. (2023) review estimates of taxonomic richness of marine organisms during the early Paleozoic based on different published datasets, and question the existence of a distinct Cambrian explosion and global Ordovician biodiversification event instead of a single, long-term radiation of life during the early Paleozoic.
- Evidence indicating that continental configuration and climate state specific to the early Paleozoic resulted in higher susceptibility of marine animals to extinction than during the rest of the Phanerozoic is presented by Pohl et al. (2023).
- A study on the extinction selectivity of benthic brachiopods belonging to the groups Rhynchonellata and Strophomenata, gastropods, bivalves and trilobites throughout the Phanerozoic is published by Monarrez, Heim & Payne (2023), who report evidence of stronger extinction selectivity with respect to geographical range than body size, particularly during background intervals, but also evidence indicating that Phanerozoic mass extinctions may have been overall less selective than extinctions during background intervals, as well as indicative of more variable strength and direction of extinction selectivity by clade during Phanerozoic mass extinctions relative to background intervals.
- Høyberget et al. (2023) report the discovery of a new, diverse early Cambrian biota (the Skyberg Biota) from the Skyberg Member of the Ringstranda Formation (Norway).
- Li et al. (2023) compare the lamello-fibrillar nacre and similar fibrous microstructures in Early Cambrian molluscs and hyoliths from the Zavkhan Basin (Mongolia) and in extant coleoid cuttlebones and serpulid tubes, report differences in shell microstructures of the studied lophotrochozoan groups, and interpret their findings as indicative of prevalence of calcitic shells in the Terreneuvian.
- A study aiming to identify the biases affecting the knowledge of the biodiversity during the Cambrian and Ordovician is published by Du et al. (2023), who interpret the significant decline in known biodiversity during Furongian interval as influenced by temporal, geographic, taxonomic and lithological biases, hindering the understanding of the real biodiversity changes in this interval.
- Eliahou Ontiveros et al. (2023) study possible causes of the Great Ordovician Biodiversification Event, and interpret global cooling as the most likely primary driver.
- A diverse Ordovician fauna (the Castle Bank fauna), comparable with the Burgess Shale and Chengjiang biotas in paleoenvironment and preservational style, is described from Wales (United Kingdom) by Botting et al. (2023).
- A study on the structure of the Givetian shallow-water reef ecosystem from the Madène el Mrakib site (Morocco) is published by Majchrzyk et al. (2023), who report that the studied community from most known Devonian reefs, as it was dominated by large branching tabulate corals while stromatoporoids were of minor importance, and note similarities between the studied community and extant shallow-water reefs.
- A study on the paleosols from the Devonian Zhongning Formation (China) is published by Guo, Retallack & Liu (2023), who find the paleosols and palaeobotany of the fossil bed where the fossil material of Sinostega was found to be similar to those of Devonian tetrapod localities in Pennsylvania, and interpret their findings as indicating that early tetrapods lived in meandering streams in semiarid to subhumid woodlands.
- A study on the fossil record of tetrapods living from the Bashkirian to the Kungurian is published by Dunne et al. (2023), who argue that apparent changes in diversity of the studied tetrapods can be explained by variation in sampling intensity through time.
- Francischini et al. (2023) describe straight, curved and quasi-helical burrows from the Permo-Triassic Buena Vista Formation (Brazil), similar to burrows reported from the Karoo Basin of South Africa, and interpret the studied burrows as likely produced by synapsids and/or procolophonians living in a desert environment, representing the oldest unambiguous record of tetrapod dwelling structures in such an environment.
- A study on the impact of the Permian–Triassic extinction event on the marine ecosystems is published by Huang et al. (2023), who find that the first extinction phase resulted in the loss of more than half of taxonomic diversity but only a slight decrease of community stability, which subsequently decreased significantly in the second extinction phase.
- Evidence indicating that reef recovery in the aftermath of the Permian–Triassic extinction was gradual and delayed compared to nonreef ecosystems is presented by Kelley et al. (2023).
- Dai et al. (2023) report the discovery of an exceptionally preserved Early Triassic (approximately 250.8 million years ago) fossil assemblage (the Guiyang biota) from the Daye Formation near Guiyang (China), providing evidence of the existence of a complex marine ecosystem shortly after the Permian–Triassic extinction event.
- Czepiński et al. (2023) report the discovery of a new, diverse vertebrate assemblage from the Ladinian Miedary site (Poland), including abundant fossil material of Tanystropheus, making the studied site the richest source of three-dimensionally preserved Tanystropheus material in the world reported to date.
- New information on the composition of the Late Triassic paleocommunity from the Polzberg Lagerstätte (Austria), based on data from thousands of new fossils, is published by Lukeneder & Lukeneder (2023).
- A study comparing changes in the marine and terrestrial biospheres across the Triassic-Jurassic transition is published by Cribb et al. (2023), who find evidence interpreted as suggestive of greater ecological severity of the Triassic–Jurassic extinction event for terrestrial ecosystems than marine ones.
- El Atfy, Abeed & Uhl (2023) describe a diverse assemblage of non-pollen palynomorphs from the Lower Cretaceous (Berriasian-Valanginian) Yamama Formation (Iraq), and interpret the studied assemblage as deposited in anoxic, neritic conditions relatively near to the land.
- Del Mouro et al. (2023) provide evidence of the preservation of organic walled microfossils (including pollen grains, spores and acritarchs) from wet peperites from the Lower Cretaceous Paraná-Etendeka intertrappean deposits of the Paraná Basin (Brazil), and interpret the studied microfossils as indicative of changes from desertic to more humid conditions in south-central Gondwana during the Valanginian.
- Cortés & Larsson (2023) reconstruct the ecological network of the marine Mesozoic fauna from the Lower Cretaceous Paja Formation (Colombia), who report that the largest marine reptile predators from the studied fauna occupied higher trophic levels than any extant marine apex predator.
- A study on the fossil record of Late Cretaceous invertebrates from the Western Interior Seaway and the adjacent Gulf Coastal Plain is published by Purcell, Scuderi & Myers (2023), who interpret their findings as indicating that the Western Interior Seaway did not contain biotic subprovinces in the Late Cretaceous, but faunal associations were affected by sea-level changes.
- Description of a diverse Santonian-?early Campanian marine vertebrate assemblage from the Akkermanovka locality (Orenburg Oblast, Russia), including fossil material of a mosasaur, plesiosaurs, bony and cartilaginous fishes (with lamniform sharks being the most diverse and abundant group in the assemblage), is published by Jambura et al. (2023).
- Bobe et al. (2023) describe fossil material of marine and terrestrial animals (including a new hyrax taxon) and woods from new sites from the Miocene Mazamba Formation (Mozambique), and interpret the studied sites as formed in coastal settings.
- Hayward et al. (2023) report the discovery of a diverse Pliocene (Waipipian) fauna from sediment excavated from two shafts at Mangere Wastewater Treatment Plant (New Zealand), dominated by molluscs and including new species records for New Zealand, as well as extending known time ranges of taxa already known from New Zealand.
- Harrison et al. (2023) provide the systematic account of the Pliocene fauna from the Lower Laetolil Beds (Laetoli, Tanzania).
- A study on the timing of Pleistocene megafaunal extinction in the high plains of Peru is published by Rozas-Davila, Rodbell & Bush (2023), who find that the collapse of megafaunal populations in high grasslands coincided with upticks in fire activity, which were likely associated with human activity.
- Martinez et al. (2023) find no evidence of a significant relation between the relative surface area of the maxilloturbinal and physiological traits such as metabolism and body temperature in extant mammals, and interpret their findings as challenging the hypothesis positing that respiratory turbinals reflect the thermal and metabolic physiology in extant and extinct tetrapods (especially in mammals).

== Other research ==
- A study on changes to the regional and global geochemical environment in the aftermath of the Sturtian glaciation is published by Bowyer et al. (2023), who find that the shift to dominant green algal primary production and the first appearance of putative sponges and problematic macrofossils might be related to global stabilization of geochemical environments following the deglaciation, to the expansion of less reducing (and likely more oligotrophic) marine environments, and to the shift from postglacial super-greenhouse conditions to a cooler climate.
- Evidence from the Cryogenian Nantuo Formation (China), interpreted as indicating that habitable open ocean conditions providing refugia for eukaryotic organisms during the Marinoan glaciation extended into mid-latitude coastal oceans, is presented by Song et al. (2023).
- Evidence of the impact of tectonic and ecological factors on redox changes in upper ocean, deep shelf and restricted basin settings throughout the Phanerozoic, which in turn were correlated with background extinction rates of marine animals, is presented by Wang et al. (2023).
- A study on the stratigraphy of the Siberian Platform (Russia), and on its implications for the knowledge of the age of the fossils and timing of first appearances of late Ediacaran and early Cambrian organisms from the Siberian Platform (including anabaritids and cloudinids), is published by Bowyer et al. (2023).
- A study on the evolution of the Earth's landscape throughouth the Phanerozoic, providing evidence of impact of landscape dynamics on the diversification of both marine life and terrestrial life, is published by Salles et al. (2023).
- Nelson et al. (2023) present high-precision age constraints for the lower Wood Canyon Formation (Nevada, United States), and interpret their findings as indicating that the base of the Cambrian Period was younger than 533 million years ago, making the early Cambrian animal radiation faster than previously recognized.
- Nolan et al. (2023) interpret Brooksella alternata as a likely pseudofossil, and the bulk of its characteristics as consistent with concretions.
- Wellman et al. (2023) present data supporting a Silurian (late Wenlock) age of the "Lower Old Red Sandstone" deposits of the Midland Valley (Scotland, United Kingdom) preserving the fossil material of Pneumodesmus newmani, supporting the interpretation of this myriapod as the oldest known air-breathing land animal.
- A study on the preservation of chemical information in the fossils from the Devonian Rhynie chert (United Kingdom) is published by Loron et al. (2023), who report that differences between prokaryotes and eukaryotes and between eukaryotic tissue types from the Rhynie chert assemblage can be identified based on the fossilization products of lipids, sugar and protein.
- A study on the geochemistry of the Bakken Formation, interpreted as indicative of stepwise transgressions of toxic euxinic waters into the shallow oceans that drove a series of Late Devonian extinction events, is published by Sahoo et al. (2023).
- Evidence from mercury concentrations and isotopes from terrestrial sections from the Sydney Basin (Australia) and Karoo Basin (South Africa), interpreted as indicative of global volcanic effects of the Siberian Traps during the Permian-Triassic transition, is presented by Shen et al. (2023).
- Evidence from concentrations of UV-B–absorbing compounds in the exine of fossil pollen from the Qubu section in southern Tibet (China), interpreted as consistent with increased UV-B radiation during the Permian–Triassic extinction event, is presented by Liu et al. (2023); their conclusions are subsequently contested by Seddon & Zimmermann (2023).
- Boulila et al. (2023) report evidence of correlated cyclicity of subduction processes and sea level changes during the last 250 million years, and link changes of marine biodiversity in the studied time interval to cyclic sea level changes resulting from deep-water exchanges paced by subduction processes.
- Lovelace et al. (2023) present data supporting a Carnian age for the majority of the Popo Agie Formation.
- Evidence from molybdenum records from cores in Germany and Northern Ireland corresponding to the Tethyan shelf, interpreted as indicative of pulses of localized marine de-oxygenation which were limited largely to marginal marine environments and likely related to shallow-marine extinctions at the end of the Triassic, is presented by Bond et al. (2023).
- Sedimentologic evidence of glaciers developing in continental Iberia during the Hauterivian is reported from the Enciso Group in the eastern Cameros Basin (Spain) by Rodríguez-López et al. (2023).
- A study on the Cenomanian–Turonian benthic foraminiferal assemblages from the Western Interior Seaway is published by Bryant & Belanger (2023), who report that the interval of increased density and diversity of benthic foraminifera known as the Benthonic Zone is not a reliable biostratigraphic marker for the onset of the Oceanic Anoxic Event 2 in the Western Interior Seaway, and that different samples of the Benthonic Zone don't reflect basin-wide changes in oxygenation.
- Evidence from two sites offshore of southwest Australia, interpreted as indicative of ocean acidification at the onset of Oceanic Anoxic Event 2 which was linked to the onset of volcanic activity, and which persisted for approximately 600,000 years due to biogeochemical feedbacks, is presented by Jones et al. (2023).
- Evidence from concentrations of sulfur and fluorine in Deccan Traps lavas, interpreted as indicative of recurring eruptive pulses of Deccan Traps volcanism before the Cretaceous–Paleogene extinction event which might have caused short-lived global drops in temperature, is presented by Callegaro et al. (2023).
- A study on the history of the Eocene waterbody within the Giraffe Pipe crater (Northwest Territories, Canada), inferred from changes in the fossil record of microorganisms, is published by Siver & Lott (2023), who interpret their findings as indicative of the presence of a series of successive shallow environments, each correlated with changes in lakewater chemistry.
- Evidence from tooth enamel of specimens of Hippopotamus antiquus from Early Pleistocene sites in Southern and Central Europe (primarily from Upper Valdarno and Vallparadís Section in Italy and Spain, respectively), interpreted as indicative of a progressive increase of environmental seasonality around the Mediterranean Basin during the Early Pleistocene, is presented by Fidalgo et al. (2023).
- Abbas et al. (2023) report the presence of Late Quaternary wetland sediments at the Wadi Hasa, Gregra and Wadi Gharandal areas in the Jordan desert, and interpret their findings as indicating that during the Marine Isotope Stage 5 the Levant was a well-watered route for human dispersal out of Africa.
- Essel et al. (2023) report the development of a new method for the gradual release of DNA trapped in ancient bone and tooth artefacts, and use this method to recover ancient human and deer mitochondrial genomes from the Upper Paleolithic deer tooth pendant from Denisova Cave (Russia).
- Reeves & Sansom (2023) present a new method which can be used to determine the impact of multiple factors (decay, ontogeny and phylogeny) on morphological variation between fossils, and apply this method to fossils of Tethymyxine, Mayomyzon, Priscomyzon, "euphaneropoids" and Palaeospondylus.
- Wang, Shu & Wang (2023) present a new method for element mapping of the fossils' 3D surface using nondestructive X-ray fluorescence, providing information on degraded material from the soft body parts in the sediments surrounding the studied fossil specimens, and apply this method to a specimen of Keichousaurus hui.
- Slater et al. (2023) study the impact of thermal maturation on eumelanin and phaeomelanin, develop a predictive model for authentic signals for eumelanin and phaeomelanin in fossil tissues, and use this model to provide molecular evidence of preservation of eumelanin in fossil feathers of Confuciusornis, as well as molecular evidence of preservation of phaeomelanin in the fossil material of the Miocene frog Pelophylax pueyoi.
- Peters et al. (2023) study collagen survival in bones from Quaternary sites across Australia, providing evidence of preservation of bone collagen dating back more than 50,000 years in the material from Tripot Cave in the subtropical Broken River limestone karst area.
- Brooke et al. (2023) demonstrate the utility of agent-based modelling for study of the ecologies of past ecosystems, using such a model to determine the drivers of distribution of large ungulates from the Palaeo-Agulhas Plain during the peak of the Last Glacial Maximum.

=== Paleoclimate ===
- A study on the evolution of the monsoon system over the past 250 million years, providing evidence of the impact of continental area, latitudinal location and fragmentation, is published by Hu et al. (2023).
- Evidence indicating that injection of the silicate dust from the Chicxulub impact into the atmosphere contributed to the global cooling and disruption of photosynthesis that followed is presented by Senel et al. (2023).
- The Cenozoic CO_{2} Proxy Integration Project (CenCO_{2}PIP) Consortium reconstructs the Cenozoic history of atmospheric CO_{2} on the basis of reevaluation of all available proxies.
- Evidence from seawater osmium isotope data from Pacific Ocean sediments, interpreted as indicating that enhanced magmatism could have played a dominant role in causing the Miocene Climatic Optimum, is presented by Goto et al. (2023).
- Wen et al. (2023) present a new land surface temperature record from the Chinese Loess Plateau in East Asia, interpreting it as indicative of late Miocene cooling and aridification that occurred synchronously with ocean cooling, highlighting a global climate forcing mechanism.
- Evidence of periodic deposition of sapropelic mud in Eastern Mediterranean during the Plio-Pleistocene and records of precipitation and vegetation from leaf wax biomarkers from the studied sapropel layers, interpreted as indicative of the impact of orbital cycles on monsoon variability in northeast Africa and on greening of the Sahara which created routes of dispersal out of Africa for hominins, is presented by Lupien et al. (2023).
- Margari et al. (2023) provide evidence of pronounced climate variability in Europe during a glacial period ~1.154 to ~1.123 million years ago, culminating in extreme glacial cooling, and argue that these conditions led to the depopulation of Europe.
