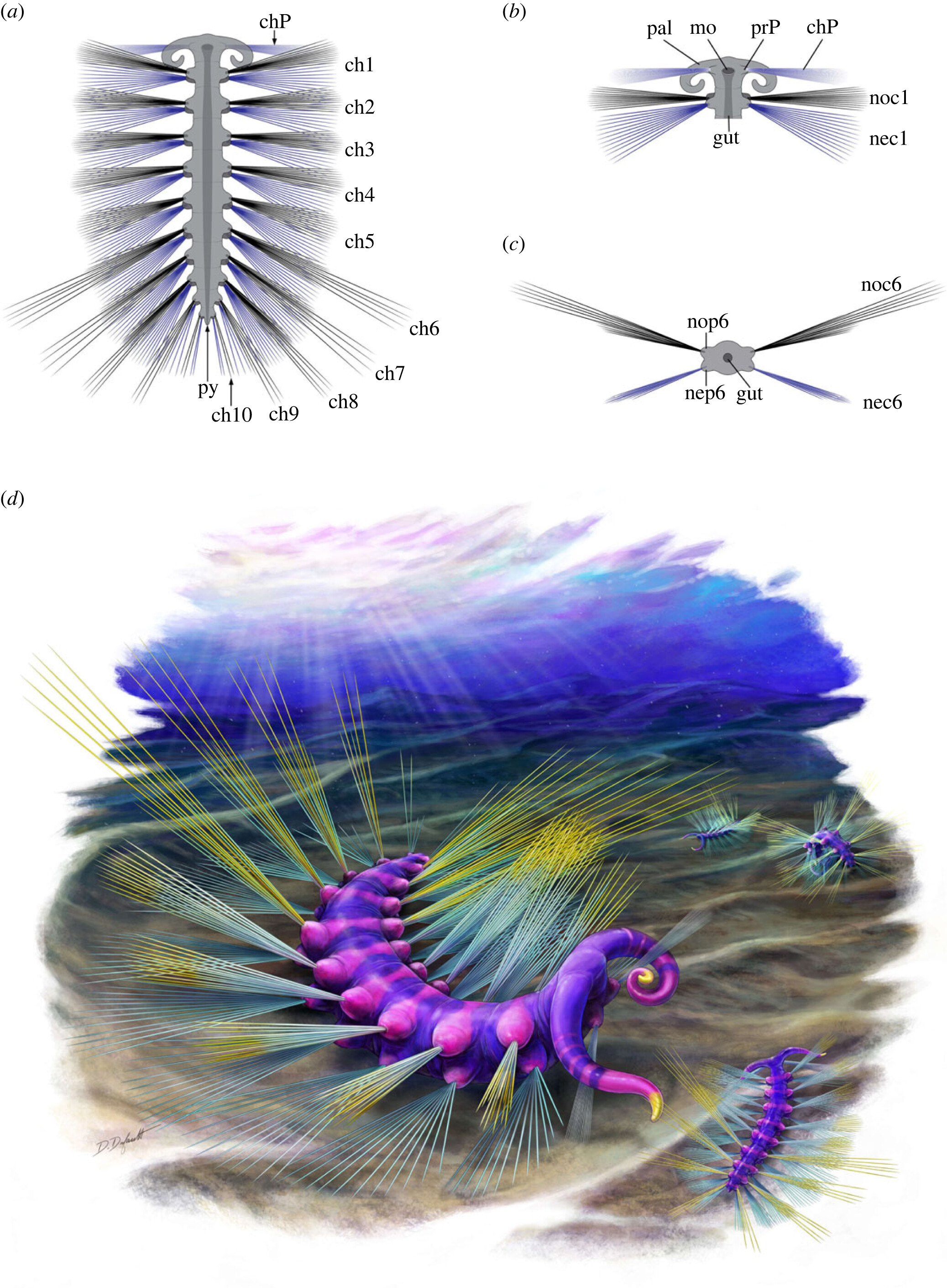

Scientific classification
- Kingdom: Animalia
- Phylum: Annelida
- Class: Polychaeta
- Order: incertae sedis
- Genus: †Ursactis; Osawa, Caron & Gaines, 2023
- Species: †U. comosa

Binomial name
- †Ursactis comosa Osawa, Caron & Gaines, 2023

= Ursactis =

Ursactis Temporal range: Wuliuan

Extinct genus of annelids

Ursactis is an extinct genus of Cambrian polychaete annelid. It was found in the Wuliuan Stage of the Burgess Shale, although most specimens come from a Burgess Shale locality known as the Tokumm Creek in northern Kootenay National Park. Ursactis is the most abundant Cambrian polychaete found as of 2023.

== Description ==
Ursactis is a small species, 3–15 millimetres (0.1–0.6 in) long, bearing a pair of large palps. It has between 8 and 10 segments, a smaller number than other polychaetes. Because specimens with 10 segments vary in size significantly and the length of each segment increases with the body length, researchers think Ursactis grew its segments rather adding new ones. Meanwhile, modern polychaetes add new segments throughout their life. This suggests that annelids began to start adding new segments during their life by the mid-Cambrian.

== See also ==
- 2023 in paleontology
