= Shaihuludia =

Shaihuludia Temporal range: Cambrian, Wuliuan

Scientific classification
- Kingdom: Animalia
- Phylum: Annelida
- Class: Polychaeta
- Genus: †Shaihuludia
- Species: †S. shurikeni

Binomial name
- †Shaihuludia shurikeni Kimmig et al., 2023

Extinct genus of marine worms

Shaihuludia is an extinct genus of polychaete worms known from the Cambrian (Wuliuan stage) Spence Shale, a lagerstätte in the United States. The genus contains a single species, Shaihuludia shurikeni, known from a single nearly complete specimen preserved on a slab and counterslab.

== Discovery and naming ==
The Shaihuludia holotype specimen, KUMIP 585569, was discovered in outcrops of the Spence Shale member of the Langston Formation (High Creek locality, Glossopleura walcotti biozone) near Logan in Cache County, Utah, United States. The specimen consists of a flattened, nearly complete specimen preserved as a slab and counterslab. The soft tissues have been replaced by iron oxides during fossilization, making the anatomy unidentifiable.

In 2023, Kimmig et al. described Shaihuludia shurikeni as a new genus and species of polychaete worms based on this specimen. The generic name, Shaihuludia, references the fictional sandworms (Shai-Hulud) of the Dune universe. The specific name, shurikeni, references the shuriken (throwing star)-like morphology of the chaetae on the animal's dorsal surface.

== Description ==
The preserved portion of the holotype is about 33 mm (1.3 in) long and 15 mm (0.59 in) at its widest point. The fan-like chaetae are 9–10 mm (0.35–0.39 in) in diameter, with each fan consisting of 6 to 8 individual blades. The chaetae have been compared to those of Canadia and Wiwaxia.
