= Temperature-size rule =

The temperature-size rule denotes the plastic response (i.e. phenotypic plasticity) of organismal body size to environmental temperature variation. Organisms exhibiting a plastic response are capable of allowing their body size to fluctuate with environmental temperature. First coined by David Atkinson in 1996, it is considered to be a unique case of Bergmann's rule that has been observed in plants, animals, birds, and a wide variety of ectotherms. Although exceptions to the temperature-size rule exist, recognition of this widespread "rule" has amassed efforts to understand the physiological mechanisms (via possible tradeoffs) underlying growth and body size variation in differing environmental temperatures.

== History ==
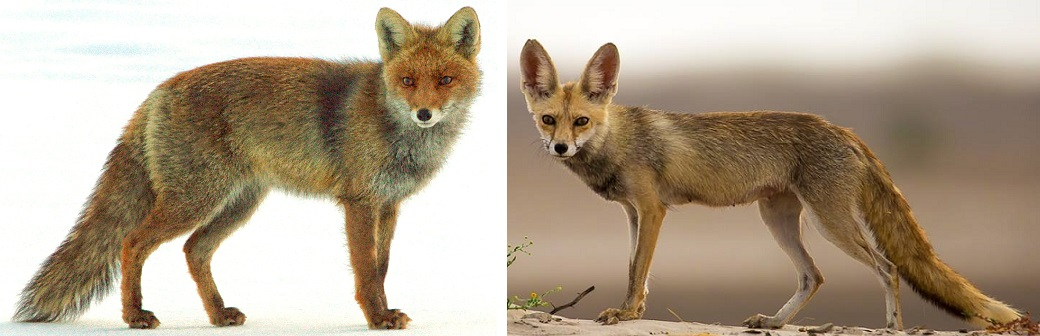
Comparative photo of a northern red fox and southern desert red fox depicting size differences with increasing latitudes (i.e. Bergmann's rule).

=== Relation to Bergmann's rule ===
In 1847, Carl Bergmann published his observations that endothermic body size (i.e. mammals) increased with increasing latitude, commonly known as Bergmann's rule. His rule postulated that selection favored within species individuals with larger body sizes in cooler temperatures because the total heat loss would be diminished through lower surface area to volume ratios. However, ectothermic individuals thermoregulate and allow their internal body temperature to fluctuate with environmental temperature whereas endotherms maintain a constant internal body temperature. This creates an inaccurate description of observed body size variation in ectotherms since they routinely allow evaporative heat loss and do not maintain constant internal temperatures. Despite this, ectotherms have largely been observed to still exhibit larger body sizes in colder environments.

=== Formulation of the rule ===
Ray (1960) originally examined body sizes in several species of ectotherms and discovered that around 80% of them exhibited larger body sizes in lower temperatures. A few decades later, Atkinson (1994) performed a similar review of temperature effects on body size in ectotherms. His study, which included 92 species of ectotherms ranging from animals and plants to protists and bacteria, concluded that a reduction in temperature resulted in an increase in organism size in 83.5% of cases. Atkinson's findings provided support for Ray's published works that ectotherms have an observable trend in body size when temperature is the primary environmental variable. The results of his study prompted him to name the increase in ectothermic body size in colder environments as the temperature-size rule.

== Tradeoffs as possible underlying mechanisms ==
=== Life history model ===
Life history models highlighting optimal growth patterns suggest that individuals assess the environment for potential resources and other proximate factors and mature at a body size that yields the greatest reproductive success, or highest percentage of offspring surviving to reach reproductive maturity.

=== Size at maturity ===
Environmental temperature is one of the most important proximate factors affecting ectotherm body size because of their need to thermoregulate. Individuals that have been observed to follow the temperature-size rule have slower growth rates in colder environments, yet they enter a period of prolonged growth that yields larger adult body sizes. One proposed explanation for this involves a trade-off in life history traits. Ectotherms experience longer daily and seasonal activity times in warmer climates versus cooler climates, however, the increase in daily activity time is accompanied by higher infant and adult mortality rates due to predation. Under these environmental conditions, some individuals occupying these warmer climate environments will mature at smaller body sizes and undergo a shift in energy allocation of all acquired energy resources to reproduction. In doing so, these individuals sacrifice growth to larger adult body sizes to ensure reproductive success, even if the trade-off results in smaller offspring that have increased mortality rates.

=== Reproduction ===
Ectotherms occupying colder environments, such as mountain ranges or other areas of higher elevation, have been observed to invest in reproduction at larger adult body sizes due to a prolonged growth period. These populations of ectotherms are characterized as having smaller clutches of larger eggs, favoring a greater reproductive investment per egg and enhances offspring survival rates. Individuals occupying warmer environments experience a trade-off between body size and overall reproductive success that many individuals occupying colder environments do not, hence, prolonging growth to yield greater reproductive success in colder environments could potentially be an underlying mechanism for why a large percentage of ectotherms exhibit greater body sizes in colder environments. However, a sufficient explanation for this observable pattern has yet to be produced.

== Investigation ==
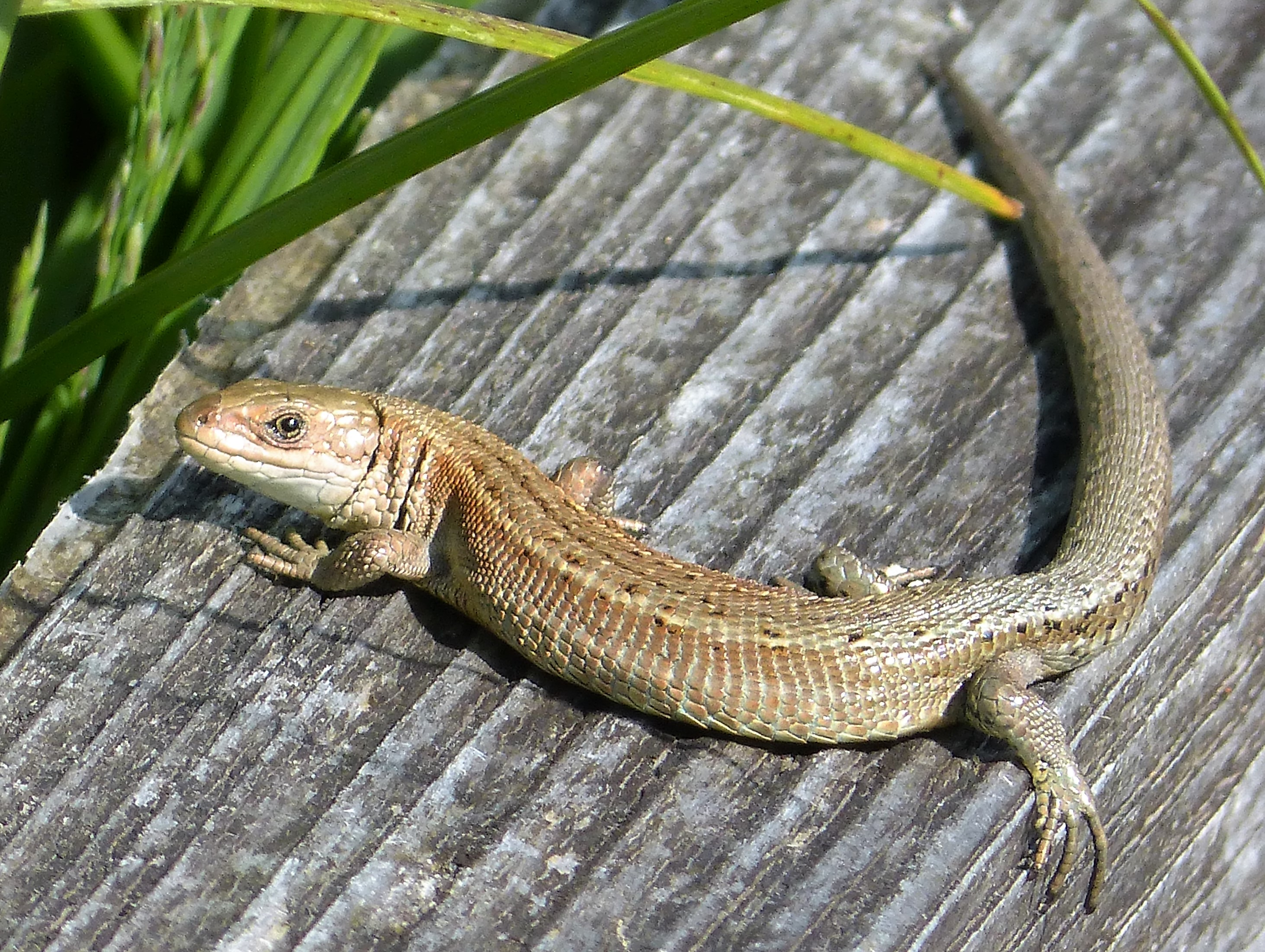
Common lizard (Lacerta vivipara).

=== Supporting evidence ===
- In the soil nematode, Caenorhabditis elegans, adult body size reared at 10°C was approximately 33% greater than individuals grown at 25°C.
- Ashton & Feldman's (2003) study concluded that chelonians (turtles) follow the temperature-size rule with 14 of 15 sp. decreasing in size with increasing temperature.
- Body size in the larval ant lion, Myrmeleon immaculatus, has been observed to follow Bergmann's size clines in response to latitudinal changes. However, when reared in high and low temperatures, body size was not affected. Food availability was the driving mechanism behind recorded body size variation.
- Hatchlings of Lacerta vivipara, now known as Zootoca vivipara, from high elevation populations were raised in outdoor enclosures at high and low altitudes. They were observed to have faster growth rates and higher mortality rates in the low altitude enclosures. Although there was no mention of exhibiting body size patterns in accordance with the temperature-size rule, the faster growth rates and higher mortality imply that lizards in the high altitude enclosures had slower growth rates and lower hatching mortality, a routine pattern indicative of species that conform to the possible temperature-size rule tradeoff.
- Eastern fence lizards, Sceloporus undulatus, exhibit delayed maturation at larger body sizes, a trend consistent with the temperature-size rule.

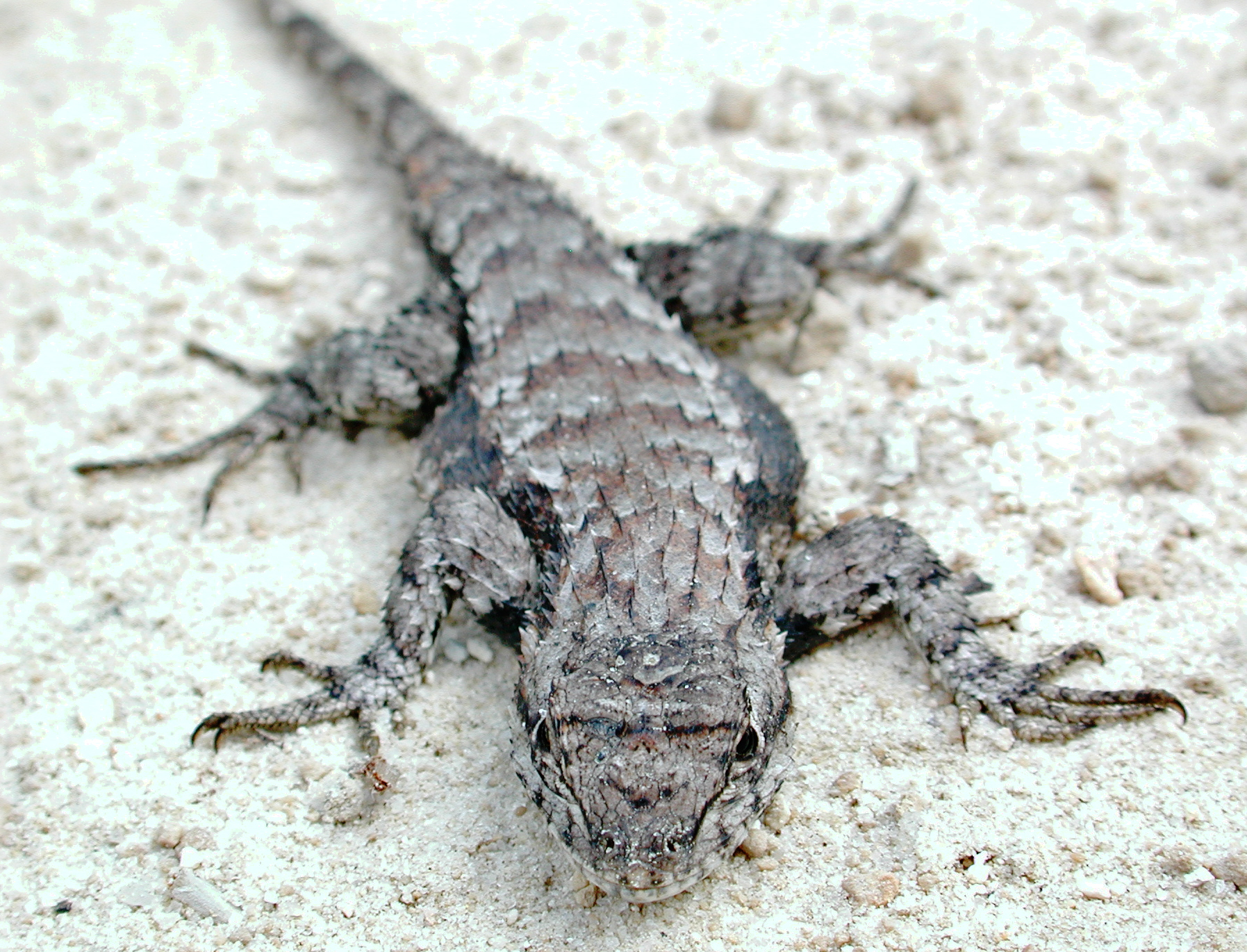
Eastern fence lizard (Sceloporus undulatus).

=== Exceptions ===
- The grasshopper, Chorthippus brunneus, is a high temperature specialist (or stenotherm) that matures to larger body sizes at high temperatures, making it an exception to the temperature-size rule.
- Juvenile survivorship in Sceloporus graciosus is not found to be higher in cooler environments, leading the species to exhibit body size clines inconsistent with the temperature size rule.
- In the same study that Ashton & Feldman provided evidence that chelonians exhibit body size clines consistent with the temperature-size rule, they also provided evidence that squamates (lizards and snakes) trend towards larger body sizes in warmer environments (40 out of 56 species increased in size with temperature). This was the first study to show a major group of ectotherms that show the converse to the temperature-size rule.

=== Notes ===
The supporting evidence and the exceptions to the temperature-size rule listed above are only a few of the potential supporting/opposing evidence available for the temperature-size rule. Each was provided to support the claim that patterns of body size observed in variable environments are not 100% predictable and more research is required to identify and understand all of the mechanisms responsible.
