= Pembecephalus =

Pembecephalus Temporal range: Lopingian

Scientific classification
- Kingdom: Animalia
- Phylum: Chordata
- Clade: Synapsida
- Clade: Therapsida
- Suborder: †Biarmosuchia
- Genus: †Pembecephalus
- Species: †P. litumbaensis

Binomial name
- †Pembecephalus litumbaensis Sidor, 2023

Extinct genus of burnetiamorph therapsid

Pembecephalus is an extinct monotypic genus of burnetiid burnetiamorph that lived in Africa during the Lopingian epoch.

== Etymology ==
The generic name Pembecephalus is composed of the Kiswahili word pembe, meaning horn, and the Ancient Greek word cephalus, meaning head. The specific epithet litumbaensis references the village of Litumba, near the type locality of the species.
