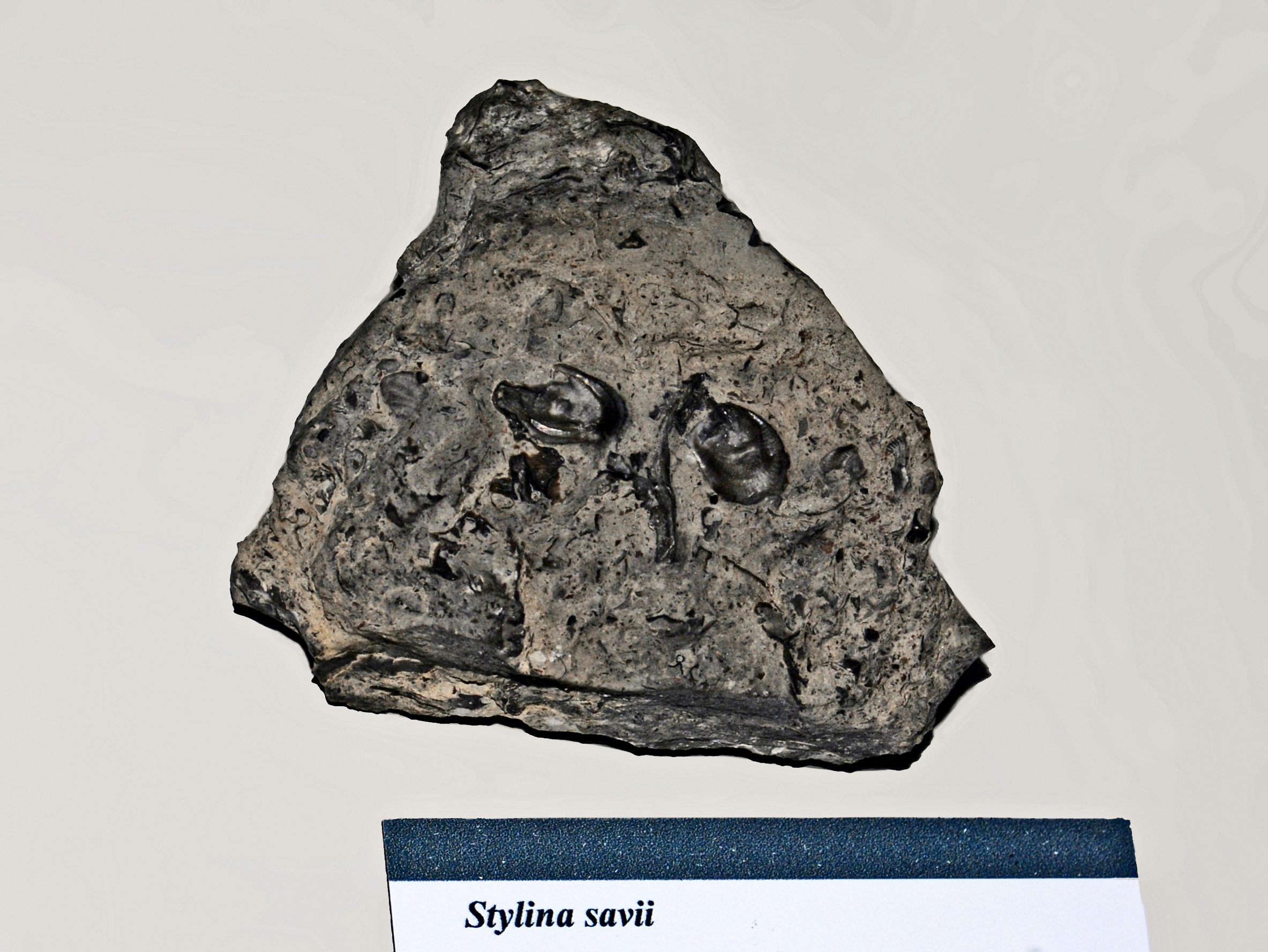
- Stylina varii from Rhaetian of Italy

Scientific classification
- Kingdom: Animalia
- Phylum: Cnidaria
- Subphylum: Anthozoa
- Class: Hexacorallia
- Order: Scleractinia
- Family: †Stylinidae
- Genus: †Stylina; Lamarck, 1816

Species
- See text

= Stylina =

Stylina Temporal range: Jurassic – Eocene ~175.6–37.2 Ma

Extinct genus of corals

Stylina is a genus of extinct stony corals.

== Fossil records ==
This genus is known in the fossil record from the Jurassic to the Eocene (from about 175.6 to 37.2 million years ago). Fossils of species within this genus have been found in Europe, Canada, China, Colombia (Coquina Group, La Guajira), Pakistan, Papua New Guinea, Thailand, Japan, Somalia, Nigeria, Iran, Tanzania, Algeria, Tunisia, Egypt, Madagascar, Russia, Ukraine, Uzbekistan, Venezuela and Chile.

== Species ==
The following species of Stylina have been described:

- S. algarvensis
- S. amdoensis
- S. anthemoides
- S. arborea
- S. arkansasensis
- S. babeana
- S. bangoinensis
- S. bucheti
- S. bulbosa
- S. bulgarica
- S. bullosa
- S. carthagiensis
- S. ceriomorpha
- S. constricta
- S. cotteaui
- S. decemradiata
- S. decipiens
- S. delabechei
- S. deluci
- S. dendroidea
- S. dongqoensis
- S. dubia
- S. echinulata
- S. elegans
- S. esmuni
- S. favrei
- S. fenestralis
- S. girodi
- S. granulosa
- S. higoensis
- S. hirta
- S. hourcqi
- S. inwaldensis
- S. japonica
- S. kachensis
- S. kantoensis
- S. laevicostata
- S. lobata
- S. lortphillipsi
- S. mabutii
- S. macfadyeni
- S. madagascariensis
- S. meriani
- S. microcoenia
- S. micrommata
- S. micropora
- S. nakasai
- S. ndalakashensis
- S. niongalensis
- S. oolitica
- S. pachystylina
- S. parcicosta
- S. parvipora
- S. parviramosa
- S. perroni
- S. ploti
- S. qiebulaensis
- S. regularis
- S. reussi
- S. reussii
- S. sablensis
- S. shamoloensis
- S. sinemuriensis
- S. spissa
- S. stellata
- S. subornata
- S. subramosa
- S. sucrensis
- S. sugiyamai
- S. tenax
- S. thiessingi
- S. tubulifera
- S. tubulosa
- S. valfinensis
- S. waldeckensis
