= Xerodromeus =

Xerodromeus Temporal range: Sakmarian

Scientific classification
- Kingdom: Animalia
- Phylum: Chordata
- Clade: Tetrapoda
- Order: †Temnospondyli
- Family: †Branchiosauridae
- Genus: †Xerodromeus
- Species: †X. gracilis

Binomial name
- †Xerodromeus gracilis Credner, 1881

Extinct genus of branchiosaurid temnospondyl

Xerodromeus is an extinct monotypic genus of branchiosaurid temnospondyl that lived in Germany during the Sakmarian stage of the Cisuralian epoch.

== Description ==
Autapomorphies of Xerodromeus included a supratemporal as wide as or wider than it was long, a highly abbreviated suture between the supratemporal and the squamosal that created a large tympanic embayment, and a wide and foreshortened basal plate of the parasphenoid. Other autapomorphies, only present in adults, included quadrate condyles significantly posterior to the occipital flange of the postparietal, a lengthened basipterygoid ramus and a thin palatine ramus, a pterygoid possessing a diminished transverse flange, an exceptionally large scapulocoracoid whose area was comparable to that of the entire postorbital skull table, and cylindrical pleurocentra and unpaired, crescent-shaped intercentra throughout the anterior and middle portions of the trunk of the individual.

== Palaeobiology ==
=== Diet ===
In exceptionally harsh environmental conditions, Xerodromeus gracilis engaged in cannibalism.
