= Diploclemella =

Diploclemella Temporal range: Early Devonian

Scientific classification
- Kingdom: Animalia
- Phylum: Bryozoa
- Class: Stenolaemata
- Order: Cyclostomatida
- Family: †Diploclemidae
- Genus: †Diploclemella
- Species: †D. serenensis

Binomial name
- †Diploclemella serenensis Ernst & Rodríguez, 2023

Extinct genus of bryozoans

Diploclemella is an extinct genus of diploclemid bryozoan that lived during the Early Devonian.

== Distribution ==
Fossils of D. serenensis are known from Spain and date to the Pragian and Emsian.
