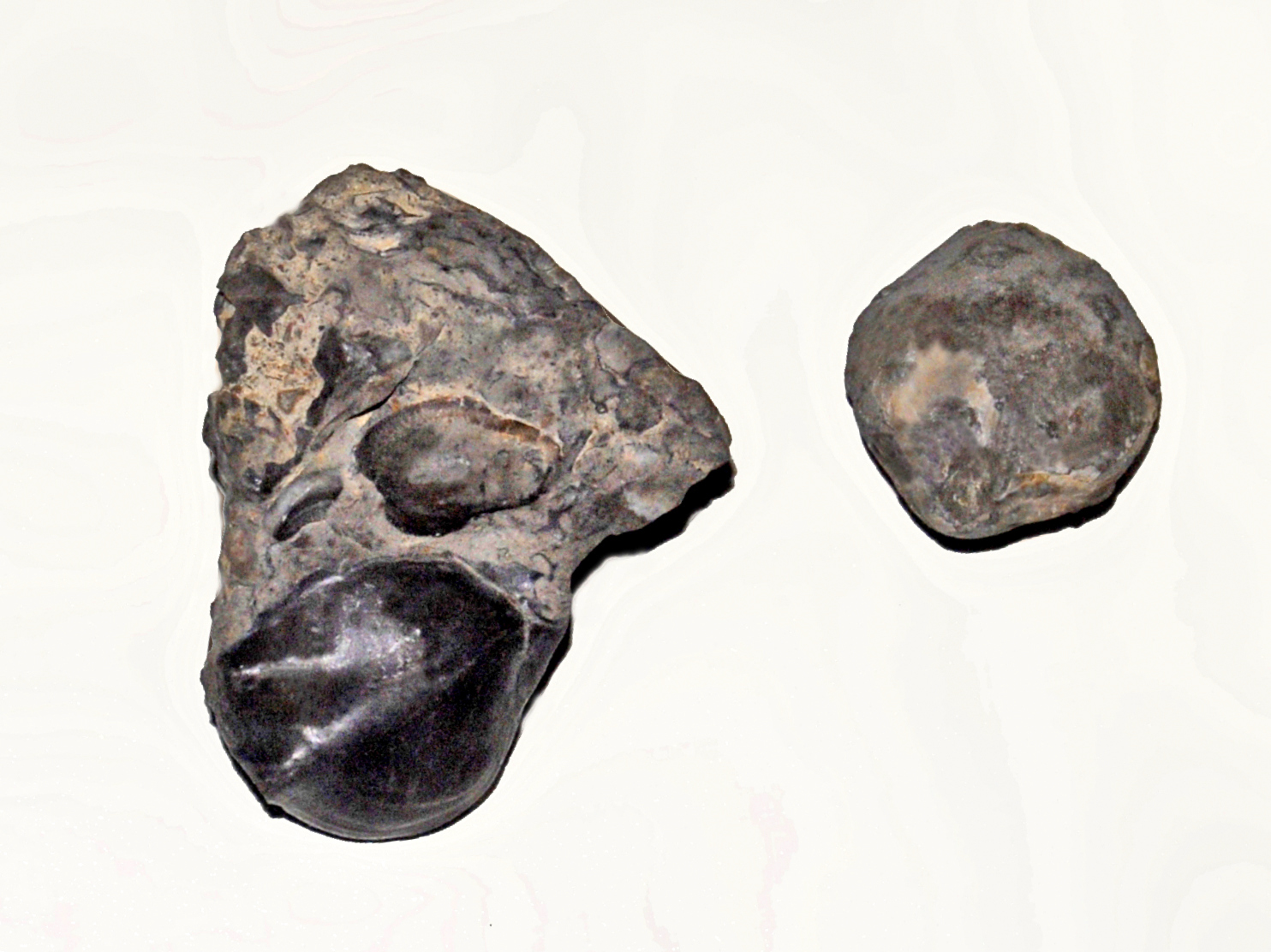
- Rhaetina gregaria from Ladinian of Italy

Scientific classification
- Kingdom: Animalia
- Phylum: Brachiopoda
- Class: Rhynchonellata
- Order: Terebratulida
- Family: †Angustothyrididae
- Genus: †Rhaetina; Waagen, 1882

= Rhaetina =

Rhaetina Temporal range: Triassic

Extinct genus of brachiopods

Rhaetina is an extinct genus of brachiopods belonging to the family Angustothyrididae.

== Species ==
Species within this genus include:

- †Rhaetina beskessensis Dagys 1963
- †Rhaetina caucasica Dagys 1963
- †Rhaetina columnaris Jin et al. 1979
- †Rhaetina elliptica Dagys 1963
- †Rhaetina gregaria Suess 1854
- †Rhaetina incurvirostra Hoover 1979
- †Rhaetina jomdaensis Sun 1981
- †Rhaetina ovalis Pearson 1977
- †Rhaetina parva Jin et al. 1979
- †Rhaetina pyriformis Suess 1854
- †Rhaetina rainei MacFarlan 2023
- †Rhaetina subcircularis Yang and Xu 1966
- †Rhaetina taurica Moisseiev 1932
- †Rhaetina tirolensis Siblik 1999
- †Rhaetina triangularis Detre 1970
- †Rhaetina zigasiensis Xu 1978

== Fossil record ==
This genus is known in the fossil record from the Triassic period (from about 251.3 to 201.6 million years ago). Fossils of species within this genus have been found in Europe, Canada, United States, China, Iran, Russia, Ukraine and Vietnam.

- Rhaetina gregaria

It is one of the most common Late Triassic brachiopod species, that has been regarded as a survivor that ranges across the Triassic-Jurassic boundary into the Early Jurassic. The external morphology of specimens from before and after the Triassic–Jurassic extinction event were initially regarded identical. Study of the internal features showed they were actually distinct species to be assigned to different genera (See Elvis taxon).

== See also ==
- List of brachiopod genera
