= Rachel Wood (geologist) =

British geologist

Rachel Wood FRS is a palaeobiologist, geologist and Professor of Carbonate Geoscience at the University of Edinburgh School of GeoSciences. Her research covers the Ediacaran–Cambrian transition, the origin of biomineralisation, the evolution of reef systems, and carbonate production through time. She is the author of Reef Evolution published by Oxford University Press (1999). In 2020, she was awarded the Lyell Medal of Geological Society of London, and in 2022 she was elected a Fellow of the Royal Society.

== Life ==
Rachel Wood is a palaeobiologist, geologist and Professor of Carbonate Geoscience at the University of Edinburgh School of GeoSciences. She earned a Bachelor of Science with Honours in Geology and Zoology at the University of Bristol, and then a PhD at the Open University.

Her research covers the Ediacaran–Cambrian transition, the origin of biomineralisation, the evolution of reef systems, and carbonate production through time. She is the author of Reef Evolution, published by Oxford University Press in 1999. Wood has researched Ediacaran fossils in Siberia and Namibia.

Wood is an associate editor of the journal Science Advances. Wood was awarded the Johannes Walther Medal of the International Association of Sedimentologists in 2018. In 2020, she was awarded the Lyell Medal of Geological Society of London, and in 2022 she was elected a Fellow of the Royal Society. She also became a Corresponding Member of the Göttingen Academy of Sciences and Humanities in 2022, and is Honorary Consul to Namibia in Scotland.
