= Cordobella =

Cordobella Temporal range: Pragian

Scientific classification
- Kingdom: Animalia
- Phylum: Bryozoa
- Class: Stenolaemata
- Order: †Trepostomatida
- Genus: †Cordobella
- Species: †C. tenuis

Binomial name
- †Cordobella tenuis Ernst & Rodríguez, 2023

Extinct genus of bryozoans

Cordobella is an extinct genus of trepostome bryozoan that lived during the Pragian.

== Distribution ==
Fossils of C. tenuis are known from Spain.
