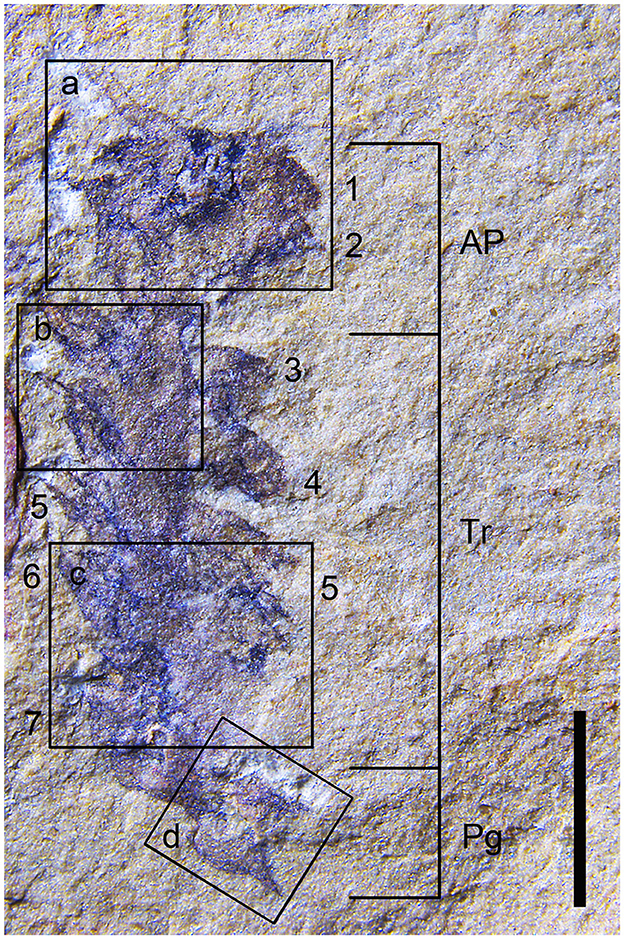
- Holotype specimen

Scientific classification
- Kingdom: Animalia
- Phylum: Annelida
- Clade: Pleistoannelida
- Subclass: Errantia
- Genus: †Gaoloufangchaeta; Zhao, Li & Selden, 2023
- Species: †G. bifurcus

Binomial name
- †Gaoloufangchaeta bifurcus Zhao, Li & Selden, 2023

= Gaoloufangchaeta =

Gaoloufangchaeta bifurcus Temporal range: Stage 4

Extinct genus of polychaete worm

Gaoloufangchaeta is an extinct genus of polychaete worms from the Cambrian (Stage 4) Wulongqing Formation of China. The type species is G. bifurcus. It may be a member of the Errantia annelids, implying members of the Annelida may have diverged from each other before the Cambrian. This dovetails with molecular studies recovering an Ediacaran origin of annelids.

Gaoloufangchaeta had bicellular eyes and possible nuchal organs, meaning it developed strong sensory abilities.
