= Sueciatractos =

Sueciatractos Temporal range: Late Silurian

Scientific classification
- Domain: Eukaryota
- Kingdom: Animalia
- Phylum: Cnidaria
- Subphylum: Anthozoa
- Class: Octocorallia
- Order: Malacalcyonacea
- Genus: †Sueciatractos
- Species: †S. leipnitzae

Binomial name
- †Sueciatractos leipnitzae Reich & Kutscher, 2023

Extinct genus of corals

Sueciatractos is an extinct genus of malacalcyonacean coral that lived during the Late Silurian.

== Distribution ==
Sueciatractos leipnitzae is known from the Hemse beds on the Isle of Gotland.
