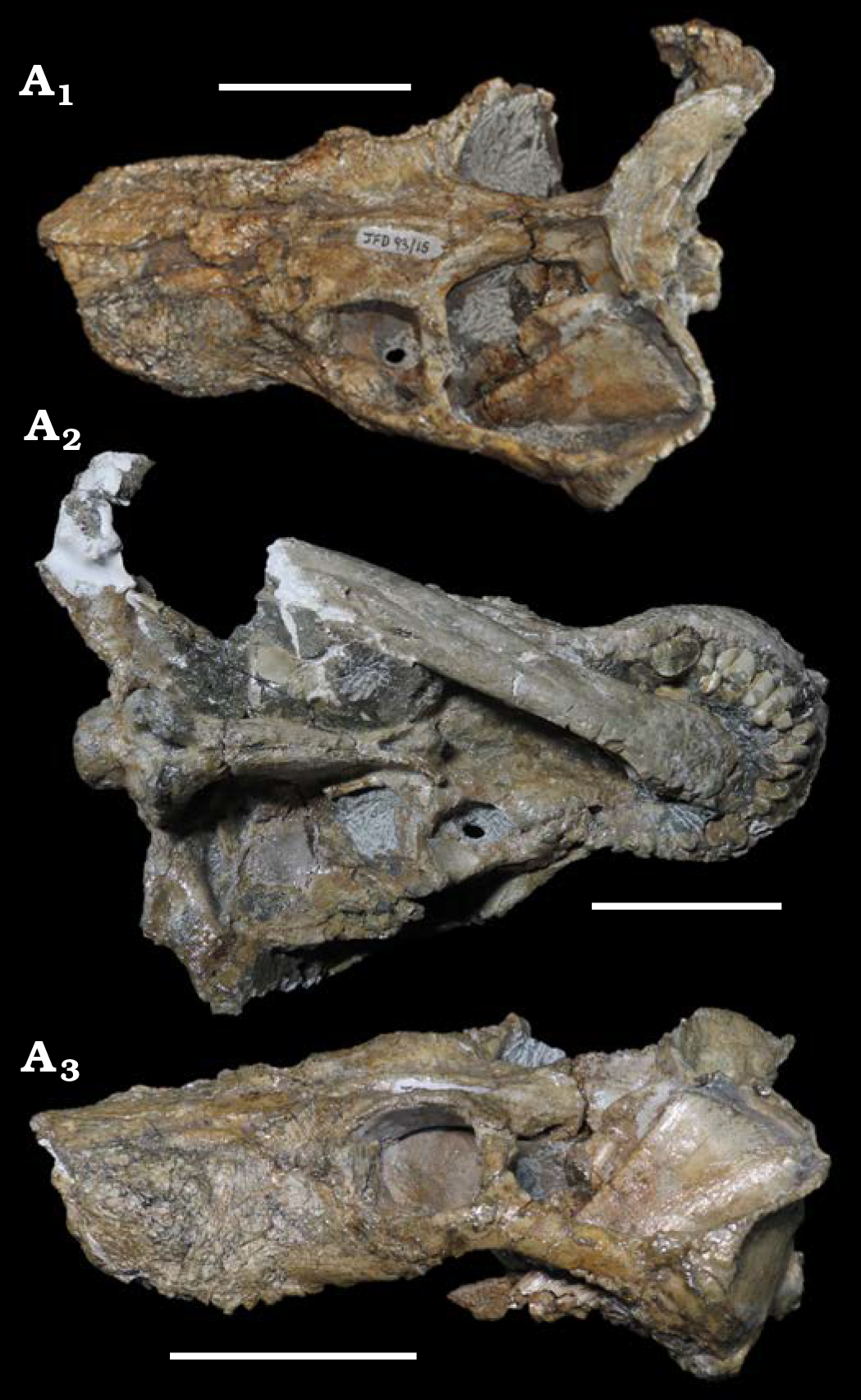
- Photographs of the referred Cradognathus albanensis skull CGP/1/2301

Scientific classification
- Kingdom: Animalia
- Phylum: Chordata
- Clade: Synapsida
- Clade: Therapsida
- Clade: †Therocephalia
- Family: †Akidnognathidae
- Genus: †Cradognathus; Lloyd & Durand, 2025
- Species: †C. albanensis

Binomial name
- †Cradognathus albanensis (Brink, 1959)

Synonyms
- Hewittia albanensis Brink, 1959

= Cradognathus =

Cradognathus Temporal range: Late Permian (Changhsingian) ~253–252 Ma

Genus of synapsid from late Permian South Africa

Cradognathus (combining Cradock and gnathus, deriving from Ancient Greek to mean "jaw") is a genus of therocephalian (an extinct type of therapsid, the group to which modern mammals belong to) that lived at the end of the Late Permian (Lopingian) of what is now South Africa. The genus was originally named Hewittia by Adrian Smuts Brink in 1959, but this name is in fact preoccupied by a genus of crab spider named earlier in 1928. "Hewittia" albanensis would not receive its own name until 2025, when a second specimen validating the genus was thoroughly described and given the new name Cradognathus in 2025. The name references Cradock, the town in South Africa closest to where it was discovered. Cradognathus is a member of the therocephalian family Akidnognathidae, and although it is relatively gracile and narrow-snouted it is most closely related to the short-snouted large predator Moschorhinus and the potentially venomous Euchambersia.

== History of study ==
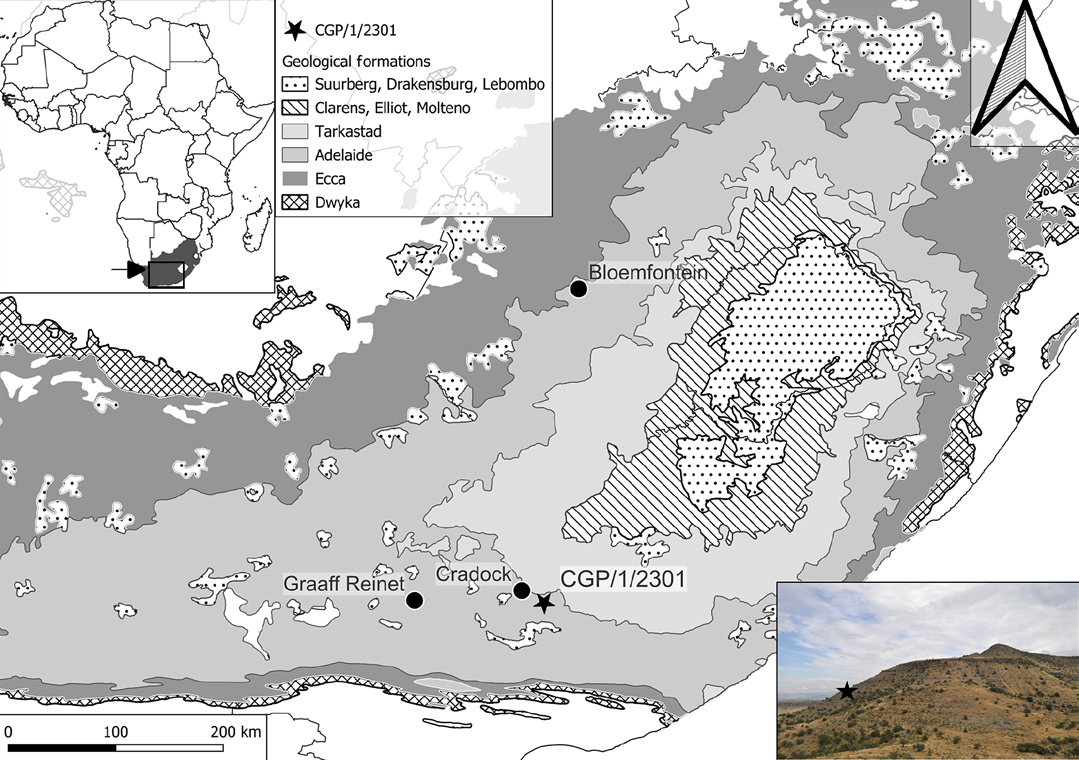
Geological map highlighting the locality the referred specimen of Cradognathus was discovered

Only two specimens of Cradognathus are known, the holotype specimen AMG (Albany Museum) 4208 and the referred specimen CPG/1/2301 (Council for Geoscience). Both specimens come from the Chris Hani District Municipality in the Eastern Cape of South Africa (formerly known as the Cradock district). The holotype is an occluded partial skull and jaw preserved up to the level of the orbits (eye sockets). AMG 4208 was described by Adrian Smuts Brink in 1959 as the new genus and species Hewittia albanensis, wherein he recognised a close similarity and affinity to Moschorhinus and proposed that they formed a distinct family of therocephalians (i.e. what is now Akidnognathidae).

However, the genus Hewittia is preoccupied by a living genus of crab spider from Central and South Africa named earlier in 1928 by arachnologist Roger de Lessert. Despite this dilemma, the taxonomy of "Hewittia" albanensis remained unaltered for the rest of the 20th century and into the 21st, with "H." albanensis being an obscure and often unacknowledged taxon in therocephalian research during this time. The few times it was acknowledged only commented on its validity, with Christiane Mendrez regarding it as valid in 1974 while James Kitching suggested AMG 4208 was a juvenile Moschorhinus in 1977.

The second specimen, CGP/1/2301, was discovered in 1993 by the Blignaut family from the nearby town of Nxuba. The fossil was mechanically prepared the same year, but it remained undescribed until palaeontologists Justin Kyle Lloyd and Francois Durand did so in 2025. Discovered in the same general area as the holotype of "Hewittia" albanensis and sharing the same anatomical features, Lloyd and Durand assigned them to the same taxon and formally replaced "Hewittia" with the new name Cradognathus. The second specimen is a more complete but compressed skull and a partial jaw and was also examined digitally with CT-scanning by Lloyd and Durand. The name Cradognathus is derived from "Cradock", the former name of the town Nxuba (and also former namesake of the Chris Hani District), combined with "-gnathus", a common suffix in therocephalian taxonomy stemming from an Ancient Greek word to mean "jaw".

Both specimens were discovered in the Chris Hani District in the vicinity of the town Nxuba (Cradock), though the original locality of the holotype itself is unknown. This location exposes rocks of the Elandsberg Member of the Balfour Formation, part of the broader Karoo Supergroup of South Africa. The holotype was originally dated to the Cistecephalus Assemblage Zone, however refinement of the stratigraphy of the Karoo Basin have instead correlated these rocks to the Daptocephalus Assemblage Zone, specifically the Lystrosaurus maccaigi–Moschorhinus Subzone that dates to the very latest Permian, approximately between 253 and 252 million years ago (Changhsingian).

== Description ==
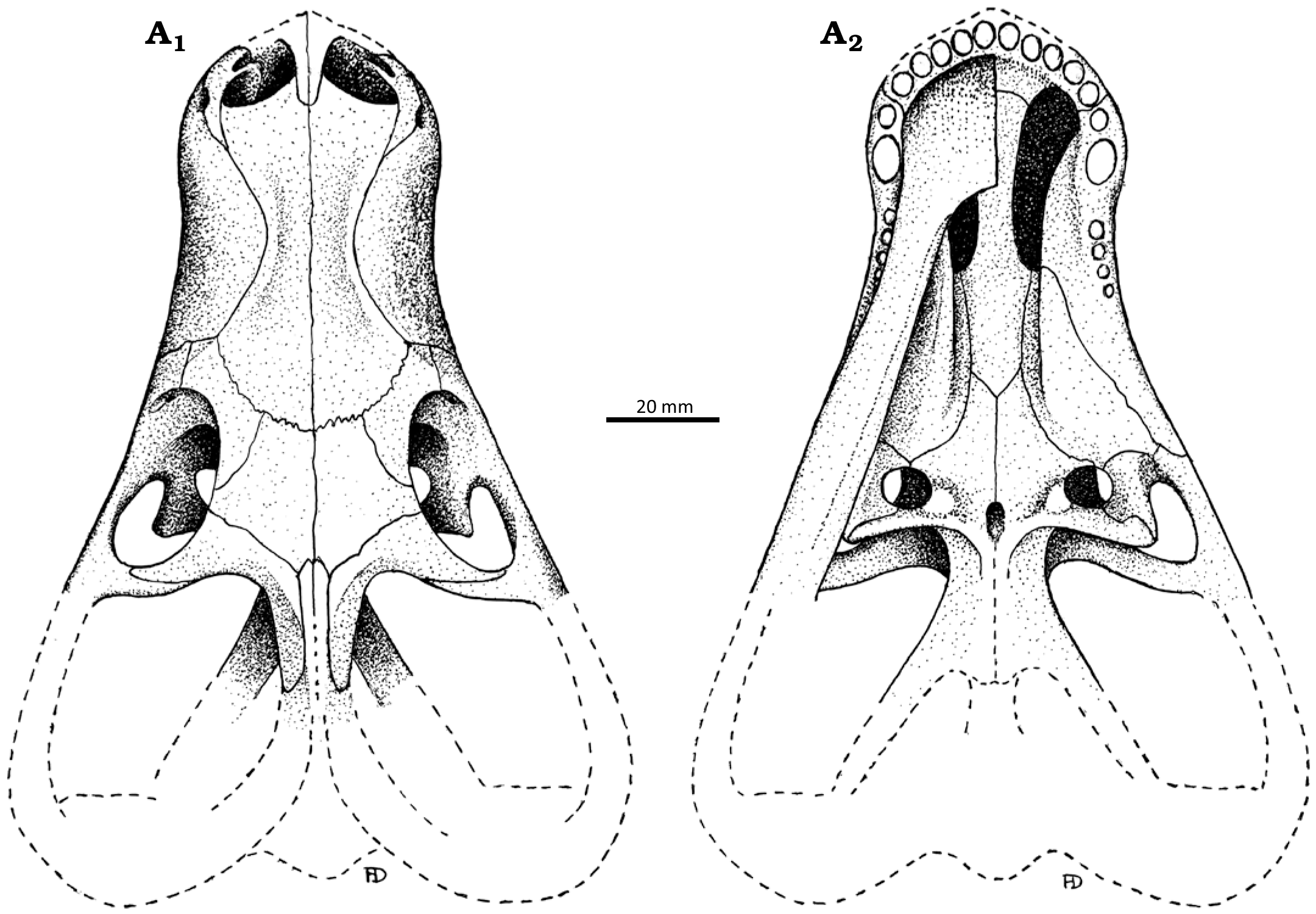
Illustrations of the holotype of Cradognathus albanensis (AMG 4208)

Cradognathus broadly resembles the related Moschorhinus, with a low and broad snout typical of akidnognathids, large incisors, well-developed canines and similarly smaller postcanine teeth and single precanine tooth. It is relatively delicate for an akidnognathid, with a comparatively long and narrower snout that is pinched behind the canines between the nose and the eyes (resembling Promoschorhynchus and the more gracile Olivierosuchus than Moschorhinus). This constriction is more pronounced in Cradognathus than other akidnognathids with pinched snouts (e.g. Promoschorynchus, Olivierosuchus and Jiufengia). The snout is pointed, with the nasal process of the premaxilla extending forwards beyond and overhanging the incisors. The lower jaw is likewise relatively slender and slopes gently to the tip, unlike the more pronounced "chin" of Moschorhinus, although it is still relatively thickened at the dentary symphysis where it supports the incisors and canines.

Cradognathus is also distinguished by features of the palate. The interpterygoid vacuity, an enclosed space between the two pterygoid bones of the palate, is relatively small and triangular, unlike the slit-shaped vacuity of other akidnognathids. Similarly, while other akidnognathids have a sharp bony keel ahead of the vacuity, Cradognathus has a shorter diamond-shaped tuberosity. Lateral to this tuberosity, the transverse processes of the pterygoids, which extend sideways across the roof of the mouth to the edge of the skull, are sharply pointed. They sport downward flanges (ventromedial flanges) that curve out and forwards along the transverse processes, ending in rough tuberosities adjacent to rounded suborbital vacuities (holes beneath the eyes). At the front of the mouth between the opening of the internal nostrils (or choanae), the suture between the vomer down the middle and the premaxilla in front is notably crescent-shaped compared to other akidnognathids.

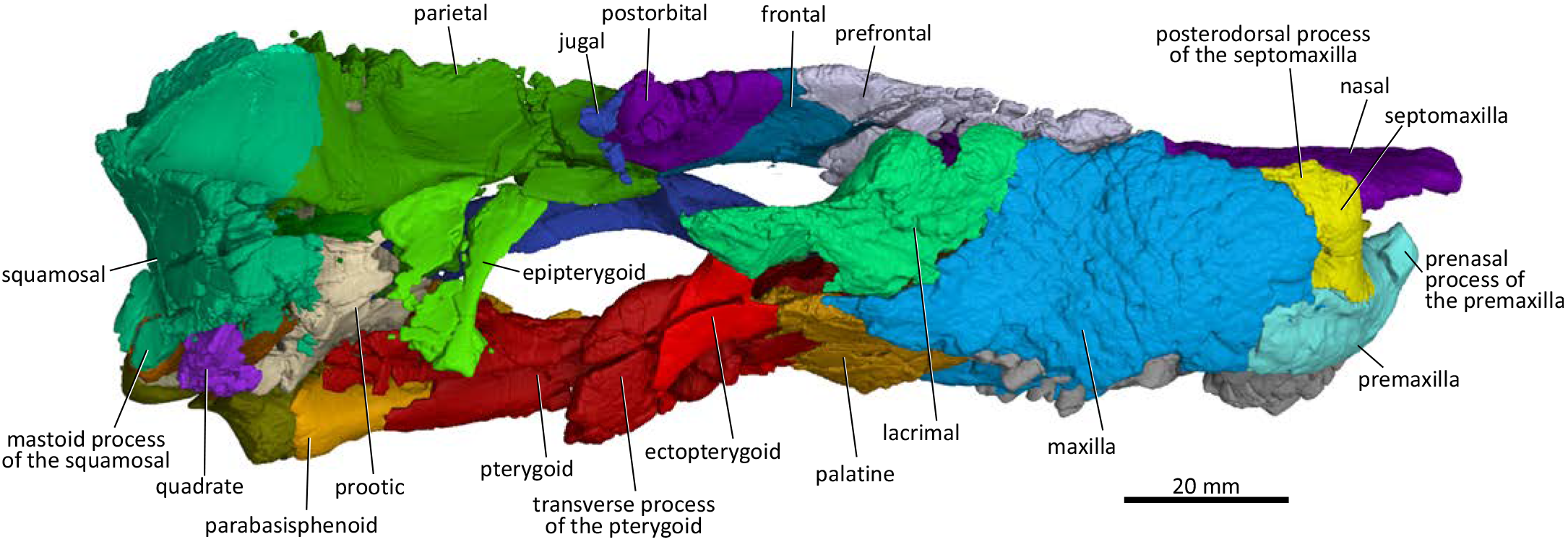
3D reconstruction of the skull of Cradognathus CGP/1/2301 in lateral view

On the roof of the skull there is a prominent ridge running down the midline of the frontal and tapering onto the nasal bones, a trait characteristic of akidnognathids, though it is narrower and sharper in Cradognathus than others (such as Moschorhinus and Olivierosuchus). Behind the eyes, the roof of the skull between the large temporal fenestra is drawn into a narrow, sharp sagittal crest for jaw muscle attachment. Like most akidnognathids (except Euchambersia and possibly Jiufengia) Cradognathus has a pineal foramen, the opening for the pineal (or "third") eye in front of this crest.

Cradognathus can also be distinguished by its dental formula. It only has three lower incisors, unlike most other akidnognathids which typically have four (a trait it shares only with Annatherapsidus). Cradognathus has a single precanine tooth and four postcanines in each upper jaw, fewer than Promoschorhynchus and Shiguaignathus but more than Moschorhinus and Olivierosuchus—only Jiufengia has the same number of postcanines. A gap, or diastema, between the canine and first postcanine distinguishes Cradognathus from other akidnognathids apart from Jiufengia.

== Classification ==
When Brink first described Cradognathus in 1959 (as "Hewittia") he recognised a close relationship between it and Moschorhinus, proposing that they belonged to their own distinct subgroup of therocephalians together with Euchambersia ("moschorhinids") that he distinguished from the Whaitsiidae. As Cradognathus went largely unacknowledged in research of therocephalian taxonomy and relationships, this attribution remained unexamined until it was redescribed in 2025. Lloyd and Durand's re-examination supported Brink's original referral and corroborated it with a phylogenetic analysis, the first to include Cradognathus, where it was recovered as a derived member of Akidnognathidae (=Moschorhinidae).

Among the akidnognathid traits they identified in Cradognathus include the frontonasal crest, thickened dentary symphysis, a palatine fossa for the lower canine, large and anteriorly facing nostril openings, and a broad anterior portion of the vomer. The combined anatomy of the interpterygoid vacuity and tuberosity, dental formula, and curving ventromedial flanges of the pterygoids with lateral tuberosities, however, are unique to Cradognathus amongst akidnognathids.

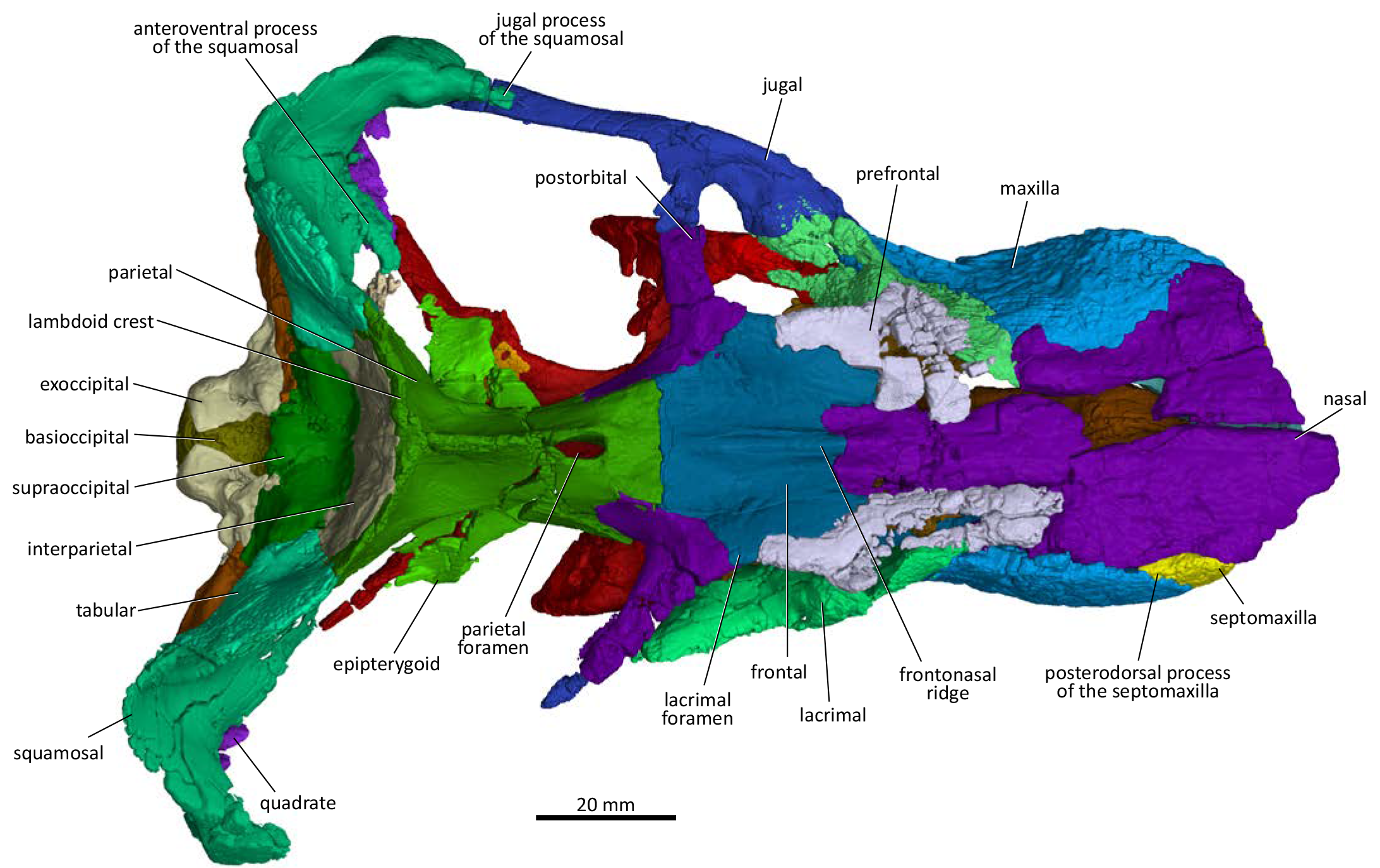
3D reconstruction of the skull of Cradognathus CGP/1/2301 in dorsal view

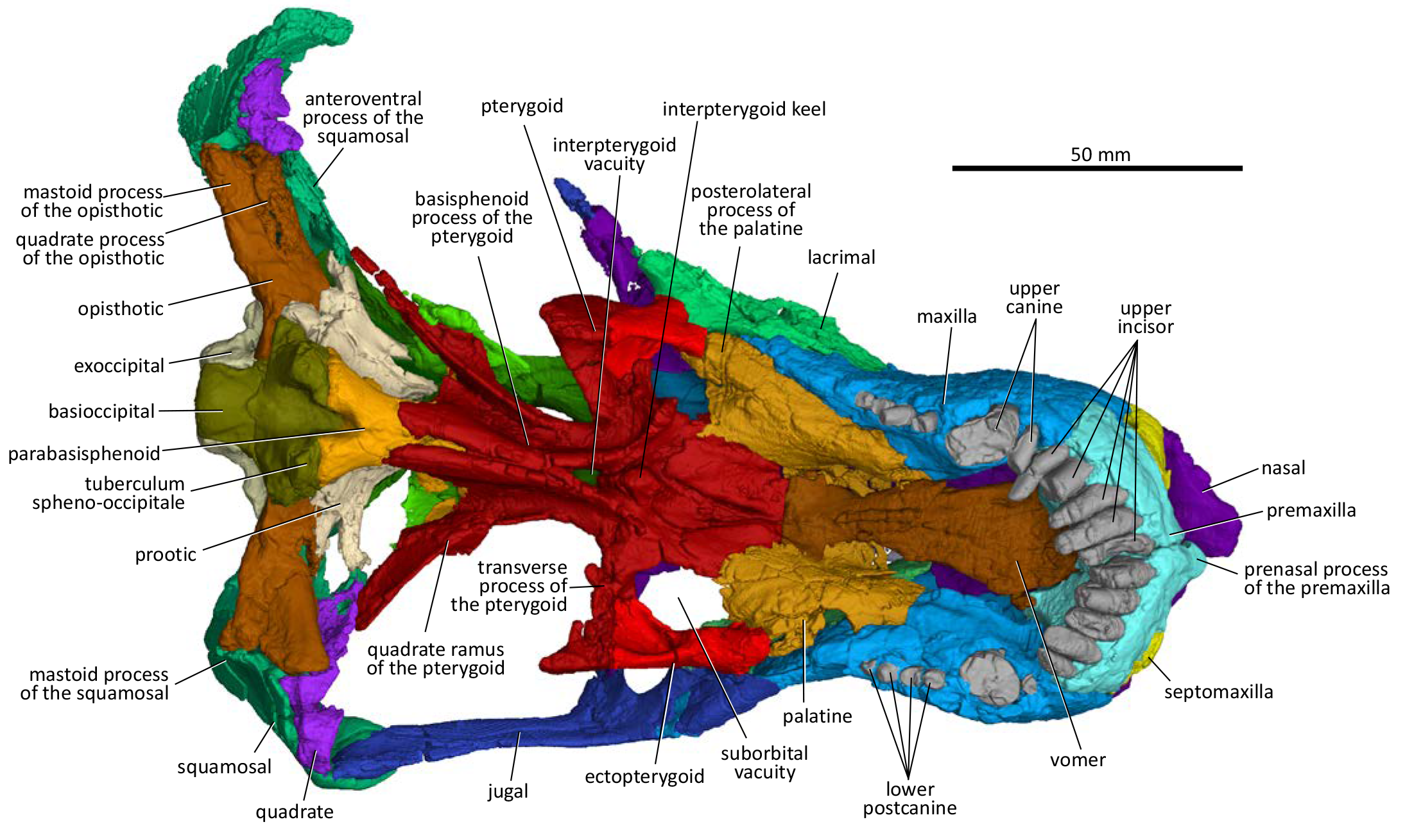
3D reconstruction of the skull of Cradognathus CGP/1/2301 in ventral view

The cladogram below depicts the results of Lloyd and Durand's 2025 phylogenetic analysis, simplified to focus on the relationships of Cradognathus within Akidnognathidae and with other bolded names representing collapsed nodes:

- Therocephalia
  - Lycosuchus
  - - Gorynychus
    - Scylacosauria
      - **Scylacosauridae**
      - Eutherocephalia
        - - Scylacosuchus
          - - Nanictidops
            - - Caodeyao
              - Purlovia
          - - Whaitsioidea
              - Ophidostoma
              - - **Hofmeyriidae**
                - **Whaitsiidae**
            - **Bauriamorpha**
        - - - Perplexisaurus
            - - Chthonosaurus
              - Ichibengops
          - Akidnognathidae
            - Annatherapsidus
            - - Shiguaignathus
              - - Jiufengia
                - - USNM PAL 412421
                  - - Akidnognathus
                    - - - Promoschorhynchus
                        - Olivierosuchus
                      - - **Cradognathus**
                        - - Cerdosuchoides
                          - Moschorhinus
                          - - Euchambersia mirabilis
                            - Euchambersia liuyudongi

== Palaeoecology ==
Cradognathus was a member of the Lystrosaurus maccaigi-Moschorhinus Subzone of the Daptocephalus Assemblage Zone, a collection of fauna in South Africa that lived at the very end of the Permian before the Permian-Triassic mass extinction. The subzone saw several faunal turnovers, particularly amongst the predators, but is broadly characterised both by the presence of the herbivorous dicynodont Lystrosaurus maccaigi and the predatory therocephalian Moschorhinus, a close relative of Cradognathus. The environment of the L. maccaigi-Moschorhinus subzone has been interpreted as well-drained floodplains, with a lower water table than the preceding subzone and so consequently a relatively drier environment, with less meandering river systems allowing longer periods of time for exposed mature soils to develop between sediment deposition.

Cradognathus is known only from the Elandsberg Member of the Balfour Formation, and also overlapped in time with a third akignognathid, Promoschorhynchus, as well as other smaller therocephalians, including Nanictidops and the baurioids Lycideops, Ictidosuchoides, Polycynodon and Scaloporhinus. Alongside Lystrosaurus maccaigi, Cradognathus coexisted with the large herbivorous dicynodonts Daptocephalus, Dicynodon, Dinanomodon, Lystrosaurus curvatus, Pelanomodon and Oudenodon, as well as the smaller Diictodon, Dicynodontoides, Emydops, Emydorhinus. The top predators were the large gorgonopsians Inostrancevia africana and Arctognathus, also represented by the much smaller Cyonosaurus, though they are a relatively depauperate part of the fauna compared to their earlier diversity. Rarer members of the terrestrial fauna were the cynodonts Cynosaurus and Nanictosaurus, the biarmosuchian Ictidorhinus, the reptiles Owenetta, Spondylolestes (both procolophonoids) and the large herbivore Pareiasaurus (a pareiasaur). In the waterways there was the temnospondyl amphibian Rhinesuchus and the fish Atherstonia and Namaichthys.
