= Moschorhinus =

Moschorhinus Temporal range: Late Permian–Early Triassic (Changhsingian to Induan) 253.48–251.7 Ma
- Skeletal reconstruction of Moschorhinus by Brandon P. Stuart. Scale bar equals 100 mm (3.9 in).

Scientific classification
- Kingdom: Animalia
- Phylum: Chordata
- Clade: Synapsida
- Clade: Therapsida
- Clade: †Therocephalia
- Family: †Akidnognathidae
- Genus: †Moschorhinus; Broom, 1920
- Species: †M. kitchingi

Binomial name
- †Moschorhinus kitchingi Broom, 1920

Synonyms
- Moschorhinus esterhuyseni Broom, 1940; Moschorhinus minor Broom, 1936; Moschorhinus natalensis Brink, 1958a; Moschorhinus warreni (Broom, 1932); Scymnosaurus warreni Broom, 1907; Tigrisuchus simus Owen, 1876

Genus of synapsid from late Permian and early Triassic South Africa

Moschorhinus is an extinct genus of therocephalian synapsid consisting of one species: M. kitchingi, which has been found in the Late Permian to Earliest Triassic of the South African Karoo Supergroup. Moschorhinus was first described by Robert Broom in 1920. Additional species, M. esterhuyseni, M. minor, M. natalensis, and M. warreni, have been proposed although they were later considered to be synonymous with M. kitchingi.

Moschorhinus is considered to be a member of the family of therocephalians known as Akidnognathidae. Akidnognathids were one of the families within eutherocephalians and were small to large sized therocephalians. Moschorhinus was a large carnivorous therocephalian, reaching 1.1–1.5 metres (3.6–4.9 ft) in total body length with the largest skull comparable to that of a lion in size, and had a broad, blunt snout which bore long, straight canines. These adaptations suggested it hunted much like a felid and was a functioned as a macropredatory mesocarnivore within the upper subzone of the Daptocephalus Assemblage Zone, niche partitioning with the contemporary gorgonopsians by occupying a different lifestyle and ecological niche.

While most abundant in the Late Permian, it survived into the Early Triassic in small numbers after the Late Permian Extinction, though these Triassic survivors had stunted growth. Following the extinction event, Moschorhinus ecologically replaced the gorgonopsians as the largest predator in the assemblage prior to the arrival of archosauriforms. Moschorhinus would go extinct 160,000 years after the first wave of extinctions, being replaced by archosauriforms and cynodonts.

== Taxonomy ==
The genus name Moschorhinus is derived from the Ancient Greek words μόσχος (mos'-khos) moschos for calf or young animal, and rhin/rhino- for nose or snout, in reference to its short, broad snout. The species name, kitchingi, refers to Mr. James Kitching, who originally found (but did not describe) the specimen.

Kitching discovered the holotype specimen, a skull (best preserved, the palate), in the Karoo Supergroup in South Africa, near the village of Nieu-Bethesda. It was first described by paleontologist Robert Broom in 1920. It is now one of the best known and most recognizable therapsids of the supergroup.

Broom had previously named another species of therocephalian in 1907 from KwaZulu-Natal, Scymnosaurus warreni, that he later moved to Moschorhinus in 1932 as M. warreni, maintaining it as a distinct species. M. warreni was later recognised as a probable synonym of M. kitchingi by Kitching in his unpublished PhD thesis, and a re-description of the holotype in 2023 by David Groenewald and Christian Kammerer confirmed this proposal. As the older name, M. warreni would have taxonomic priority over M. kitchingi for the species. However, Groenewald and Kammerer (2023) believed it would be premature to establish M. warreni as the correct name, pending a revision of akidnognathid therocephalian taxonomy and the possibility that even older names may have seniority.

Moschorhinus remains have been found most prominently in the Upper Permian to Lower Triassic Beaufort Group.

=== Classification ===
Moschorhinus is a therocephalian, a member of the clade Eutheriodontia and the sister taxon to cynodonts and modern mammals. Moschorhinus is classified into the family Akidnognathidae, along with other large, carnivorous therapsids with strong skulls and large upper canines. While the oldest akidnognathids were uncovered in Africa, the phylogenetic placement of Annatherapsidus, Shiguaignathus and Jiufengia, suggests the group evolved within Laurasia.

Additionally, phylogenetic modeling suggests akidnognathids evolved in the Capitanian stage of the Middle Permian. Cladogram models by Liu and Abdala recovered Moschorhinus is recovered as a sister taxon to Cerdosuchoides. However, the discovery of Cradognathus suggests an polytomy between Moschorhinus, Cerdosuchoides, and Euchambersia.

The cladogram based on Liu and Abdala (2022), which largely shared the topology recovered by Huttenlocker and Sidor (2016):

- Therocephalia
  - Lycosuchus
  - - Gorynychus
    - Scylacosauria
      - Scylacosauridae
      - Eutherocephalia
        - Scylacosuchus
        - - - Whaitsioidea
              - Ophidostoma
              - - - Hofmeyria
                  - - Ictidostoma
                    - Mirotenthes
                - Whaitsiidae
            - Baurioidea
          - - Chthonosauridae
            - Akidnognathidae
              - Annatherapsidus
              - - Shiguaignathus
                - - Jiufengia
                  - - USNM PAL 412421
                    - - Akidnognathus
                      - - - Olivierosuchus
                          - Promoschorhynchus
                        - - - Moschorhinus
                            - Cerdosuchoides
                          - Euchambersia

Cladogram by Lloyd and Durand (2025):

- Therocephalia
  - Lycosuchus
  - - Gorynychus
    - Scylacosauria
      - Scylacosauridae
      - Eutherocephalia
        - - Scylacosuchus
          - - Nanictidops
            - - Caodeyao
              - Purlovia
          - - Whaitsioidea
              - Ophidostoma
              - - Hofmeyriidae
                - Whaitsiidae
            - Bauriamorpha
        - - - Perplexisaurus
            - - Chthonosaurus
              - Ichibengops
          - Akidnognathidae
            - Annatherapsidus
            - - Shiguaignathus
              - - Jiufengia
                - - USNM PAL 412421
                  - - Akidnognathus
                    - - - Promoschorhynchus
                        - Olivierosuchus
                      - - Cradognathus
                        - - Cerdosuchoides
                          - Moschorhinus
                          - - Euchambersia mirabilis
                            - Euchambersia liuyudongi

== Description ==
=== Size ===
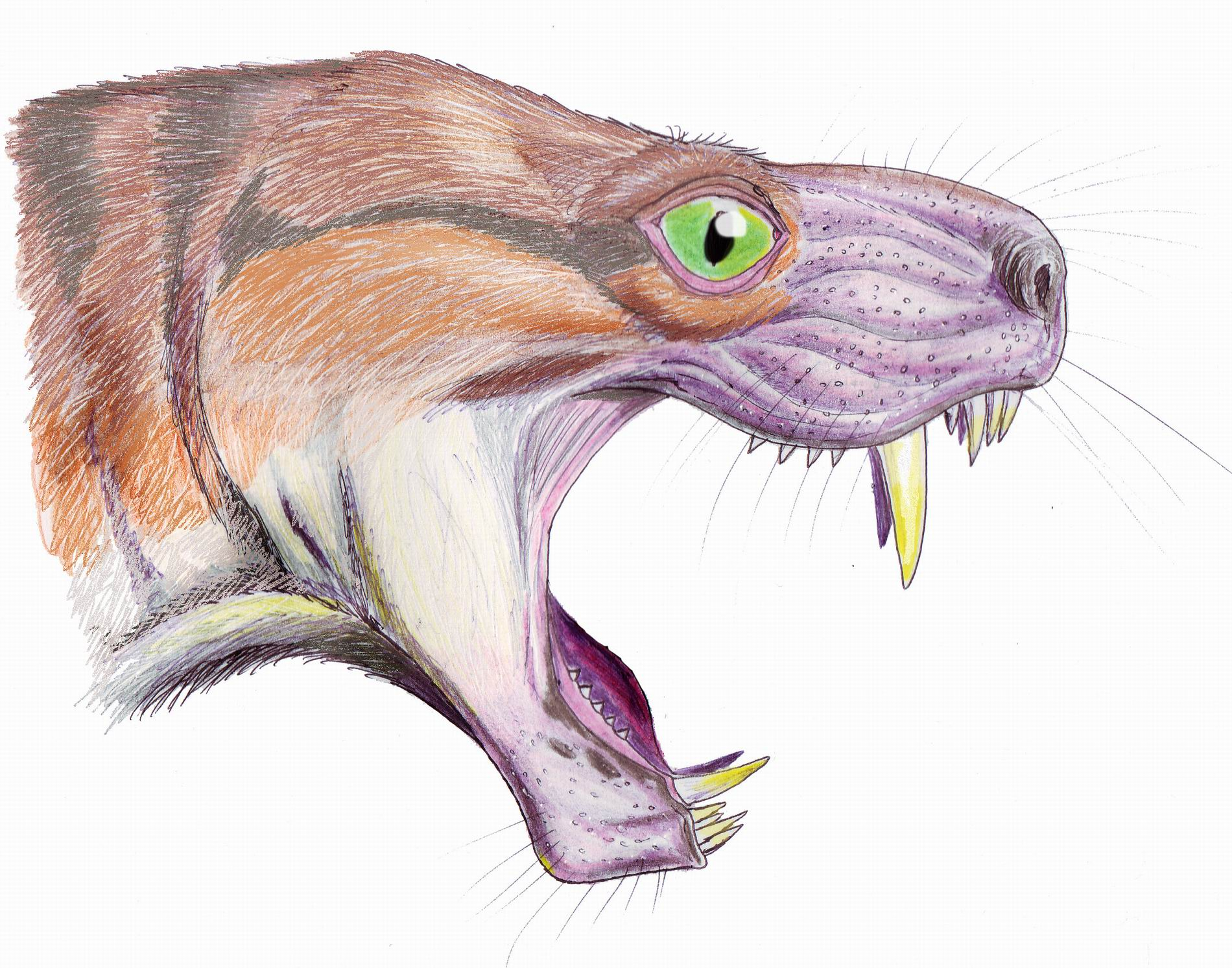
Artist interpretation of Moschorhinus, with hypothetical hair.

Moschorhinus was a medium to large therocephalian and the largest known akidnognathid, reaching 1.1–1.5 metres (3.6–4.9 ft) in total body length. The largest Moschorhinus skull measured 260 mm (10 in) in length. NMQR 3351, a specimen with a skull length of 240 mm (9.4 in), was estimated to have a body length of 1.1–1.3 metres (3.6–4.3 ft) and weighed 84.3 kilograms (186 lb). Permian specimens were larger than Triassic specimens, with Permian skulls averaging 207 mm (8.1 in) in length, while that of Triassic skull averaged 179 mm (7.0 in).

=== Skull ===
The skull is similar to that of the gorgonopsians, with large temporal fenestrae (three in total as a synapsid) and a convexly bowed palate. The snout of Moschorhinus is characteristically short and broad. The blunt tip of the snout features a ridge running down the midline to the frontal bone. The lower jaw is much broader than that of any other therocephalian. The upper snout projects a bit beyond the incisors in juveniles. The nostrils were large and positioned towards the tip of the snout.

The palate is convex, with a broad, triangular vomer, with paired tubercles, rounded projections pointing ventrally, similar to other akidnognathids. The palatine bones (forming the back of the roof of the mouth) are enlarged and thick, especially on their outer edges where they are joined to the maxilla. On their inner edges, the palatines are joined to the pterygoid and vomer on the nose, forming part of the circumference of the nasal cavity. Between the palatine and maxilla, just behind the canines, are large foramens, presumably to allow for nerves. A slanting ridge along the middle of the palatine presumably supported a soft palate, which allowed air to travel between the nose and the lungs.

The closely related Promoschorhynchus shows stiff folds (choanal crest) on the border of the nasal passage and the throat, used to keep it open and to allow for breathing while eating. The development of a secondary palate in the skull gradually evolved in therocephalians, and the choanal crest is featured in all later therocephalians.

Tracing the roof of the skull, Moschorhinus possesses small prefrontal bones above the eyes, followed by large, widened frontal bones. The parietals form a narrow sagittal crest along the midline of the skull, which houses a very basic pineal foramen. Indentations can be seen in the temporal fossae, depressions on either side of the crest, indicating the presence of many blood vessels and nerves supplying the brain.

The lacrimal bone is larger than the reduced prefrontal, and forms the majority of the eye socket. The lacrimal has a bony boss (a rounded knob) on the orbit, and a large foramen towards its inner side. The lower edge of the eye socket is formed the jugal and maxillary bones. The jugal ends at the eye socket, and is not convex, as in several later therocephalians.

=== Dentition ===
Moschorhinus is thought to have had a dental formula of I6.C1.M3, with 6 incisors, 1 canine, and 3 postcanines in either side of the upper jaw. The incisors are housed in the premaxillae. They are large, curve slightly, and have a bell-shaped cross-section. They had smooth cutting surfaces, and, unlike those of other therocephalians, lacked facets or striae resulting from abrasion and wear. The large canines are held within the maxillae, and are quickly identifiable features of Moschorhinus. In length, these canines were comparable to gorgonopsians, although they were more round in the cross-section. While there is no real modern analogue, the most similar living example would be the clouded leopard (Neofelis nebulosa).

Like other therocephalians, Moschorhinus had a reduced number of postcanines which were housed in the maxillae. In most therocephalians, the “teeth,” or rather toothlike projection (denticulations) of the pterygoid bones, are greatly reduced or missing, and in Moschorhinus they are absent.

=== Postcranial remains ===
==== Vertebrae ====
Atlas-axis and third cervical vertebrae

Moschorhinus had a presacral vertebral count of 27, which is consistent with other therocephalians, which suggests compared to other therapsid clades, therocephalians had a highly conversed number of presacral vertebrae. The axial skeleton of Moschorhinus has remarkable similarities to Scaloposaurus along with differentiation, along with morphological changes in the ribs and vertebral structures in the transitional region. The seventh cervical vertebrae is noted to have been a transition to the dorsal region with the projection of the neural spine becoming more dorsal, the neural arch having an absence of the lateral ridge on the lateral margin, and an increase in the anteroposterior width. The ribs of the seventh cervical is more anteroposteriorly broader than preceding cervical ribs and nearly equal to succeeding dorsal ribs in length.

==== Ribs ====
The cervical ribs were dichocephalous, with the tubercula of the fourth, fifth, and sixth cervical rib being dorsoventrally tall and anteroposteriorly broad. The tuberculum of the seventh cervical rib was more robust than the preceding ribs, being dorsoventrally taller and anteroposteriorly broader. The capitulum of the fifth cervical rib was noted to have been dorsoventrally low and slender. The proximal portion of the shafts was posteroventrally directed, mediolaterally thin, and gets progressively anteroposteriorly broader from the fifth cervical rib.

The caudal ribs have been recovered for Moschorhinus, however, they weren't well exposed. Caudal ribs were fused to their respective transverse processes and were noted to have anteroposteriorly short shafts that were projected similarly to the related Olivierosuchus and basal therocephalians.

==== Pectoral girdle ====
The scapula of Moschorhinus was similar to that of other therocephalians by having an elongated scapular blade, a convex lateral surface, and lacking an acromion process. Compared to other eutherocephalians, akidnognathids had more a robust scapula. The coracoid and clavicle were found to have little differences between other therocephalians. However, the clavicle can be distinguished with scalloped edges of the ventral end, which may be an autapomorphy for the genus.

The interclavicle was remarkably small in comparison to the rest of its skeleton and differed from the spoon-shaped interclavicles of basal therocephalians.

==== Forelimbs ====
The right humerus of Moschorhinus (NMQR 48 and NMQR 3351)

Compared to other eutherocephalians, the scapula of Moschorhinus and other akidnognathids were generally more robust. The humerus was more similar to basal therocephalians in the degree of its robustness and expansion of the epiphyses, compared to the comparatively narrow epiphyses of eutherocephalians. However, compared to basal therocephalians, the humerus supported a large, well-developed deltopectoral crest and lacked a ectepicondylar foramen. The radius and ulna were noted to have been relatively similar to other therocephalians.

The manus was broad and short, closely resembling basal therocephalians, differentiating from Olivierosuchus, which had a more slender manus.

==== Hindlimbs ====
The femur was similar to other therocephalians with the presence of a slight curvature and three distinct trochanters. The midline position within internal trochanter was similar to that of therocephalians with the exception of baurioid Choerosaurus.

== Paleobiology ==
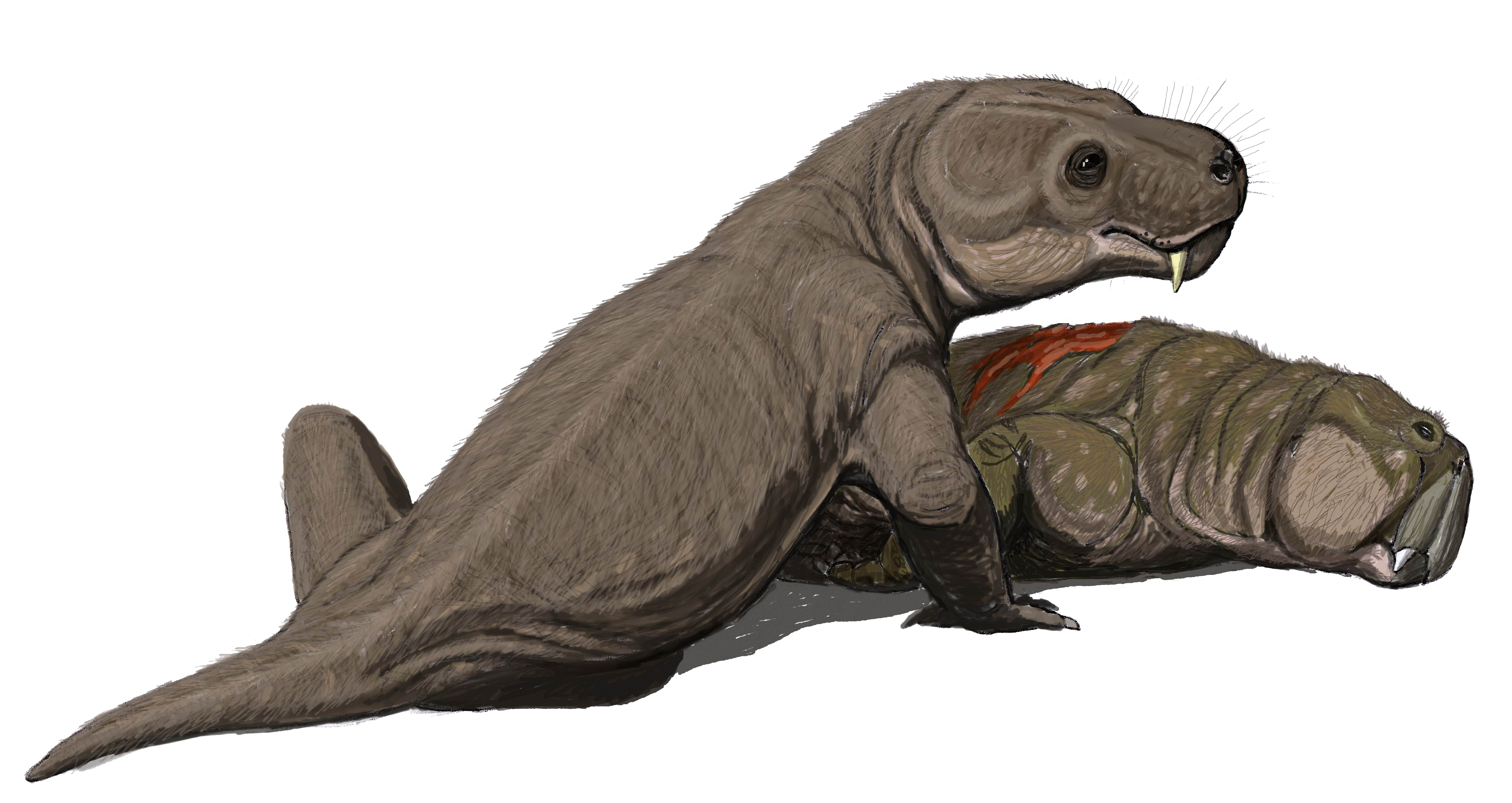
Life reconstruction of Moschorhinus feeding on a Lystrosaurus

=== Growth ===
Histological analysis by Huttenlocker and Botha (2013) found Triassic Moschorhinus specimens grew faster than Permian ones and had an attenuated growth period. This resulted in reduced body size in the former, largely believed to be an effect of the harsher environmental variability after the Permian Extinction (Lilliput effect). In comparison, Permian specimens had a prolonged growth rate, with small Permian specimens representing early or late subadults approaching asymptotic sizes, rather than being juveniles. In a following paper, Huttenlocker and Botha found overall number of tissue vascularity increased with body size among therocephalians as noted in lycosuchids, scylacosaurids, and Moschorhinus. Compared to other akidnognathids, Moschorhinus had a greater number of cortical vascularity.

=== Predatory behavior ===
Following the extinction of basal therocephalians (lycosuchids and scylacosaurids), eutherocephalians were predominantly small-bodied and were likely insectivores. However, some eutherocephalians such as Moschorhinus were able to re-evolved large body sizes and macropredatory behavior. Valkenburgh and Jenkins (2002) hypothesized the combination of long, robust canines and flattened incisors suggests Moschorhinus was a cat-like predator, being able to pierce skin and hold onto struggling prey with its long canines. They suggested this was the earliest known instance of this hunting behavior. Singh et al. (2024) conducted an ecomorphological analysis on the mandible of non-mammalian synapsids and recovered as Moschorhinus a grip and rip attacker (GRA). The authors noted GRA specialists likely targeted relatively smaller prey as the elongation of their jaws was unsuited for extended struggle with larger prey. However, they also noted more robust forms were capable of targeting larger, similar sized prey.

== Paleoecology ==
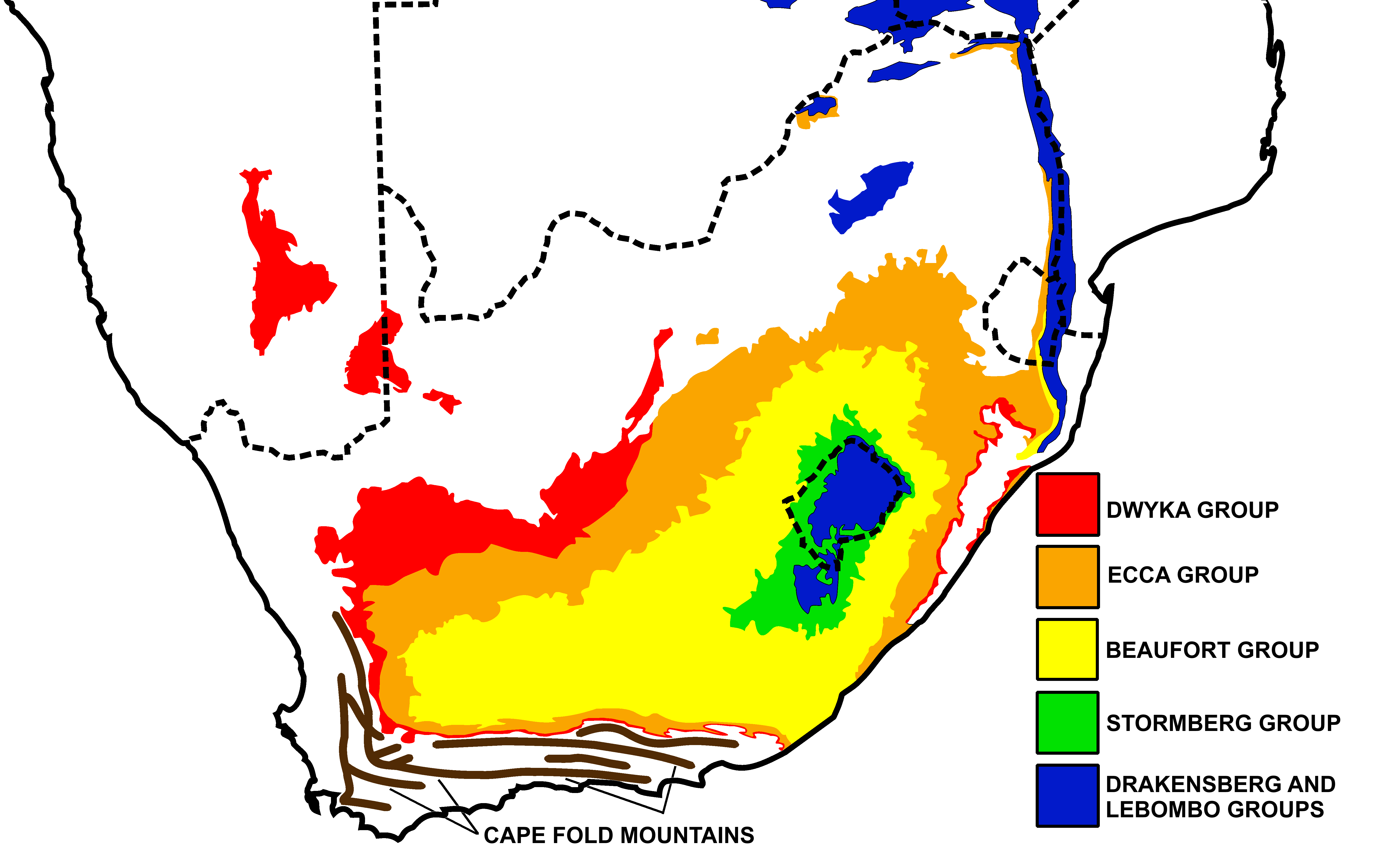
The Karoo Supergroup and its outcrops

=== Daptocephalus Assemblage Zone ===
Moschorhinus first appeared in the Lystrosaurus maccaigi-Moschorhinus subzone of the Daptocephalus Assemblage Zone. Ash-fall deposits suggests the subzone dates between 253.48 ± 0.15 to 252.24 ± 0.11. The upper subzone was thought to have been a well-drained floodplain. The Lystrosaurus maccaigi-Moschorhinus subzone had notable changes in the environment compared to the older Dicynodon-Theriognathus subzone, with an increase in aridification, which saw the decline of lacustrine floodplains, which were replaced by well-drained floodplains. During the transition, gorgonopsians, such as rubidgeines and Lyaencops went extinct. Following the extinction of the rubidgeines, the Laurasian Inostrancevia filled in the vacant niche as the apex predator. Additionally, the whaitsiid Theriognathus also went extinct during the transition, being replaced by Moschorhinus. The turnover event also saw a notable extinctions among dicynodonts such as Diictodon feliceps and Aulacephalodon bainii. It also saw the first appearance of Lystrosaurus maccaigi, which became increasing abundant following the end of the transition.

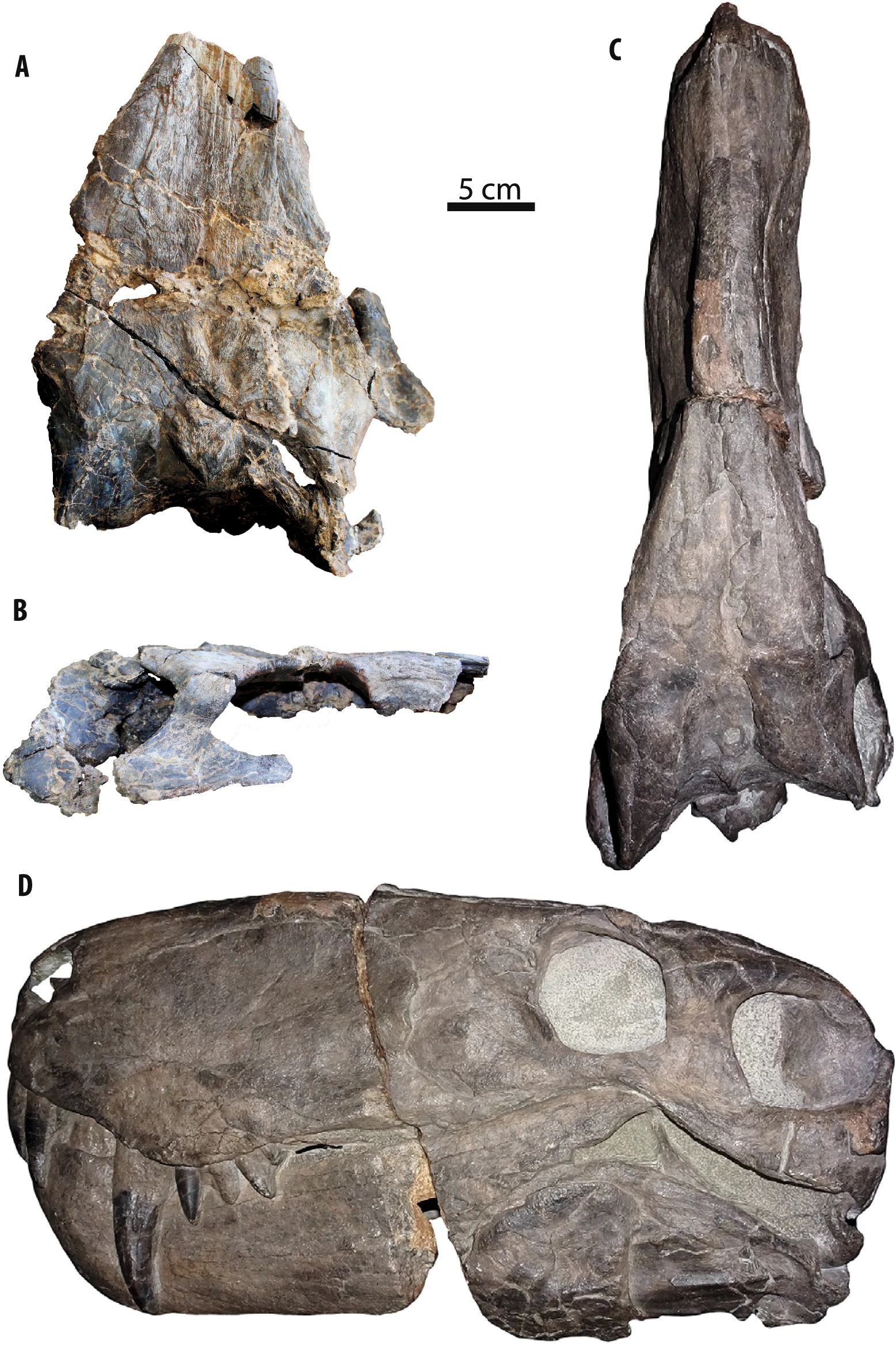
Cranial remains of Inostrancevia africana. Inostrancevia was the apex predator in the Lystrosaurus maccaigi-Moschorhinus subzone following the extinction of Rubidgea atrox.

Contemporary therapsids included dicynodonts such as Dicyodon lacerticeps, Dinanomodon gilli, Daptocephalus leoniceps, Pelanomodon moschops, and Lystrosaurus, therocephalians such as Lycideops longcips, Nanictidops kitchingi, Promoschorhynchus, Polycynodon elegans and Cradognathus, cynodonts such as Cynosaurus suppostus, Nanictosaurus kitchingi, and Vetusodon elikhulu, the biarmosuchian Ictidorhinus matinsi, and gorgonopsians such as Cyonosaurus longiceps, Arctognathus curvimola, and Inostrancevia africana. Sauropsids were represented by the pareiasaur Pareiasaurus serridens, the owenettid Owenetta rubidgei, and Spondylolesyes rubidgei, with amphibians including rhinesuchid temnospondyls Rhinesuchus and Uranpcentrodon senekalensis.

The presence of similar sized predators within the mesocarnivorous niche suggests some form of niche partitioning was present. Moschorhinus had more robust forelimbs and hindlimbs than the small-bodied gorgonopsians, which were more gracile in comparison. Its metacarpals and phalanges were shorter compared to the stylopod and zeugopod. In comparison, gorgonopsians had longer and larger metacarpals and phalanges, which suggests a different lifestyle and ecological niche between small-bodied gorgonopsians and Moschorhinus. The anatomy of their canines were also different, with the conical canines of Moschorhinus being adapted for withstanding, while the blade-like canines of gorgonopsians was better suited for slashing, as well as "puncture and pull" biting. The combination of its robust cranial and postcranial anatomy, as well as its rapid and consistent growth may have given it a competitive advantage over the similar sized gorgonopsians.

The end of the assemblage zone coincided with the Permian-Triassic mass extinction, which saw the extinction of gorgonopsians, pareisaurs, and most dicynodonts. Therocephalians were also noted to have a decline in diversity and saw the extinction of Whaitsioidea. Of the fauna from the upper Daptocephalus AZ, only the dicynodont Lystrosaurus, and therocephalians Moschorhinus, Tetracynodon, and Promoschorhynchus (supposed Triassic specimens of Ictidosuchoides have been reassigned to this genus) survived the extinction. Following the extinction of the gorgonopsians, Moschorhinus would ecologically replace the gorgonopsians and became the largest predator in the Karoo Basin.

=== Lystrosaurus declivis Assemblage Zone ===
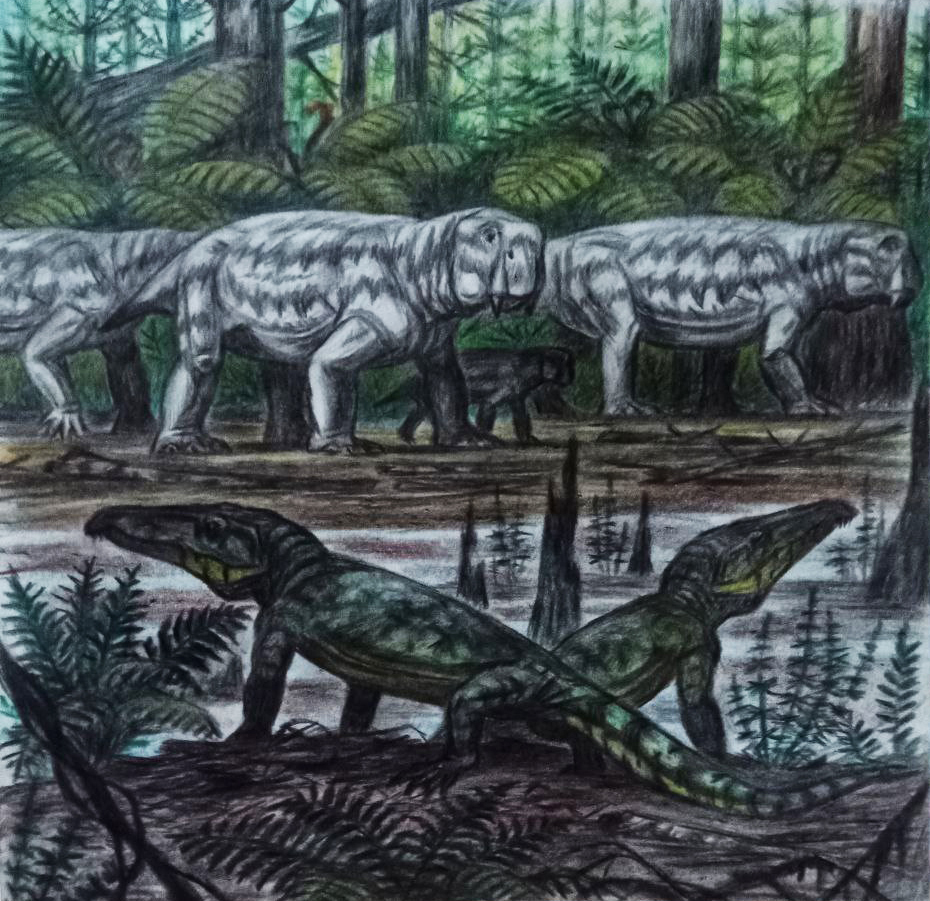
Life reconstruction of Lystrosaurus murrayi and Proterosuchus fergusi, both present in the Lystrosaurus declivis Assemblage Zone

The Lystrosaurus declivis Assemblage Zone is marked by the appearance of Lystrosaurus declivis and Lystrosaurus murrayi. Sauropsids were represented by archosauriforms Proterosuchus fergusi, Prolacerta broomi, Heleosuchus griesbachi and Noteosuchus colletti, the lepidosauromorpha Paliguana white, parareptiles Saurodektes kitchingorum, Coletta seca, Procolophon trigoniceps, Sauropareion anoplus, and Phonodus dutoitorum. Appearance of Triassic therapsids were represented by dicynodont Lsytrosaurus and Myosaurus gracilis, therocephalians Olivierosuchus parringtoni, Regisaurus jacobi, Scaloposaurus constrictus, Tetracynodon darti, and Ericiolacerta parva, and cynodonts Platycraniellus elegans, Progalesaurus lootsbergensis, Galesaurus planiceps, Thrinaxodon liorhinus. Amphibians were represented by temnospondyls such as Rhytidosteus capensis, Broomistega putterilli, Micropholis stowi, Thabanchuia oomie, Lydekkerina huxleyi, Eolydekkerina magna, Kestrosaurus dreyeri, and an indeterminate Trematosauridae.

Following the appearance of Proterosuchus, Moschorhinus was no longer the largest predator in the Karoo Basin. Compared to Permian Moschorhinus, Triassic Moschorhinus were smaller than the former, likely in response to the harsher conditions of the Early Triassic. Despite the decrease in size, Moschorhinus was still the largest therocephalian of the Triassic.

=== Extinction ===
Moschorhinus went extinct in the earliest Triassic, roughly 160,000 years after the Permian Extinction as the result of the second wave of extinction. This second wave of extinction wiped out 80–95% of animal species was caused by to a hypoxia event. The hypoxia event appears to have led to stunted growth, intense seasons, reduced ecosystem diversity, and a loss of forests. Following the extinction of Moschorhinus, the archosauriform Proterosuchus and cynodonts.
