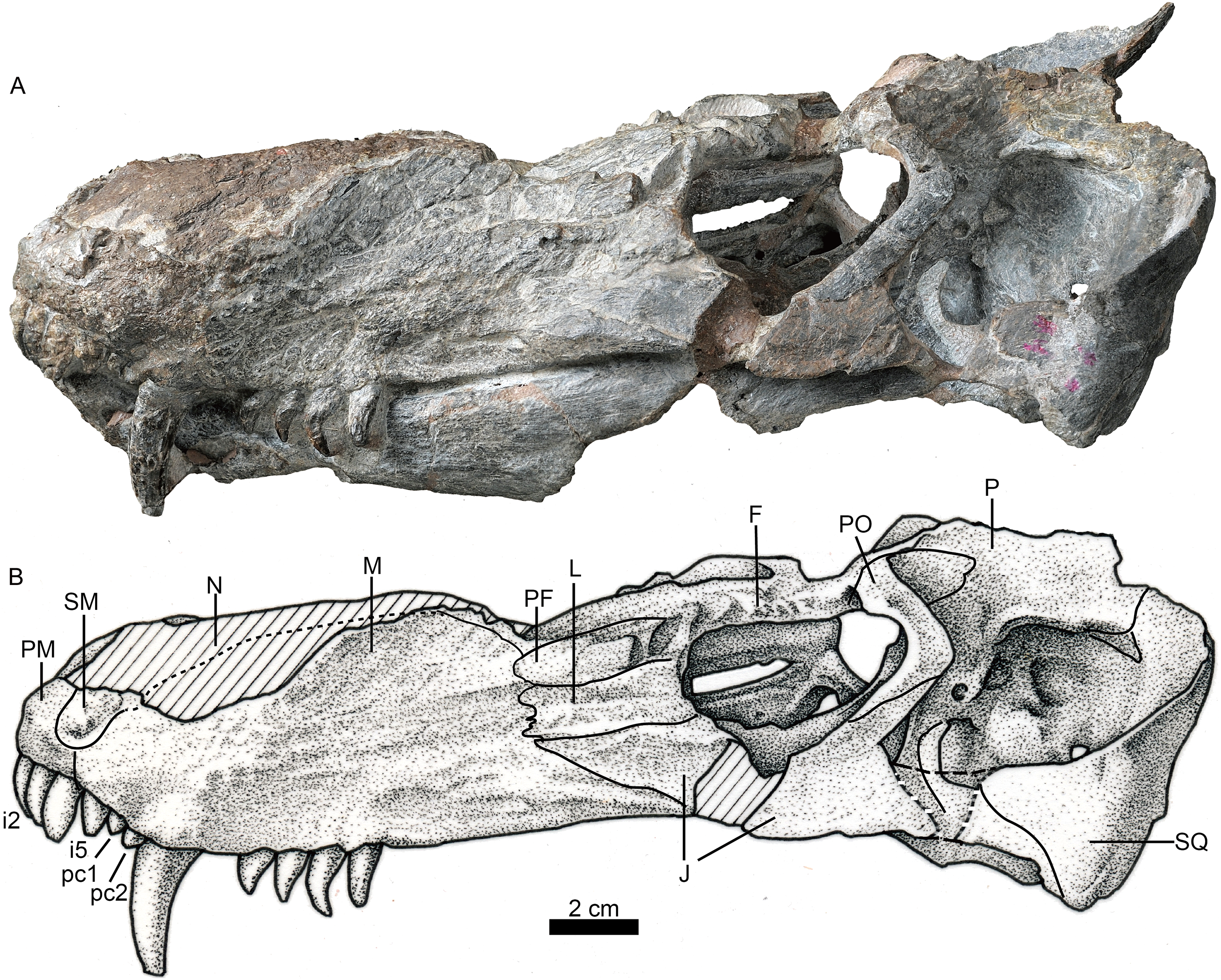
- Holotype skull of Jiufengia jiai

Scientific classification
- Kingdom: Animalia
- Phylum: Chordata
- Clade: Synapsida
- Clade: Therapsida
- Clade: †Therocephalia
- Clade: †Eutherocephalia
- Family: †Akidnognathidae; Nopcsa, 1928

Genera
- List: † Akidnognathus Haughton, 1918; † Moschorhinus Broom, 1920; † Euchambersia Broom, 1931; † Cerdosuchoides Broom, 1936; † Notaelurodon Broom, 1936; † Pelictosuchus Broom, 1940; † Proalopecopsis Brink & Kitching, 1951; † Promoschorhynchus Brink, 1954; † Annatherapsidus Kuhn, 1963; † Zorillodontops Cluver, 1969; † Olivierosuchus Kammerer & Sidor, 2002; † Shiguaignathus Liu & Abdala, 2017; † Jiufengia Liu & Abdala, 2019; † Cradognathus Lloyd & Durand, 2025

Synonyms
- Euchambersiidae Boonstra, 1934; Annatherapsididae Kuhn, 1963; Moschorhinidae Mendrez, 1974

= Akidnognathidae =

Akidnognathidae Temporal range: Late Permian-Early Triassic 256–247 Ma Suspected Middle Permian origin

Extinct family of therapsids

Akidnognathidae is an extinct family of therocephalian therapsids from the Late Permian and Early Triassic of South Africa, Russia and China. The family includes many large-bodied therocephalians that were carnivorous, including Moschorhinus and Olivierosuchus. One akidnognathid, Euchambersia, may even have been venomous. Akidnognathids have robust skulls with a pair of large caniniform teeth in their upper jaws. The family is morphologically intermediate between the more basal therocephalian group Scylacosauridae and the more derived group Baurioidea.

== Research history ==
The first known fossils of akidnognathids consists of two skulls which were discovered during a series of excavations carried out from 1899 until 1914 by Vladimir Amalitsky and his companion Anna P. Amalitsky in the Northern Dvina, in present-day European Russia. In an article published posthumously in 1922, Amalitsky established a new taxon of therocephalians under the name Anna petri, in honor of his companion. In his description he judges it to be similar to Scylacosaurus. In 1963, Oskar Kuhn proposed changing the name of the genus to Annatherapsidus, seeing that Anna was an already preoccupied taxon. Currently, Annatherapsidus is the only akidnognathid known from Russian territory.

The first akidnognathid to be described was the type genus Akidnognathus, named in 1918 by Sidney Henry Haughton from a skull discovered by reverend John H. Whaits in the Beaufort Group, South Africa. The specimen comes more precisely from the upper Cistecephalus Assemblage Zone, within the Karoo Supergroup. It is in the Karoo supergroup where the majority of known akidnognathids will be identified, with at least two additional genera, namely Euchambersia and Proalopecopsis, also from the upper Cistecephalus Assemblage Zone.

Akidnognathids were historically only reported from Russia and South Africa, but it was from 2017 that paleontologists Jun Liu and Fernando Abdala described several taxa from the Naobaogou Formation, in Inner Mongolia, China, from several fossils collected on this fossil site since 2009. Among these described taxa, the two authors identify a second species of Euchambersia, a genus that was previously reported only in South Africa.

== Classification ==
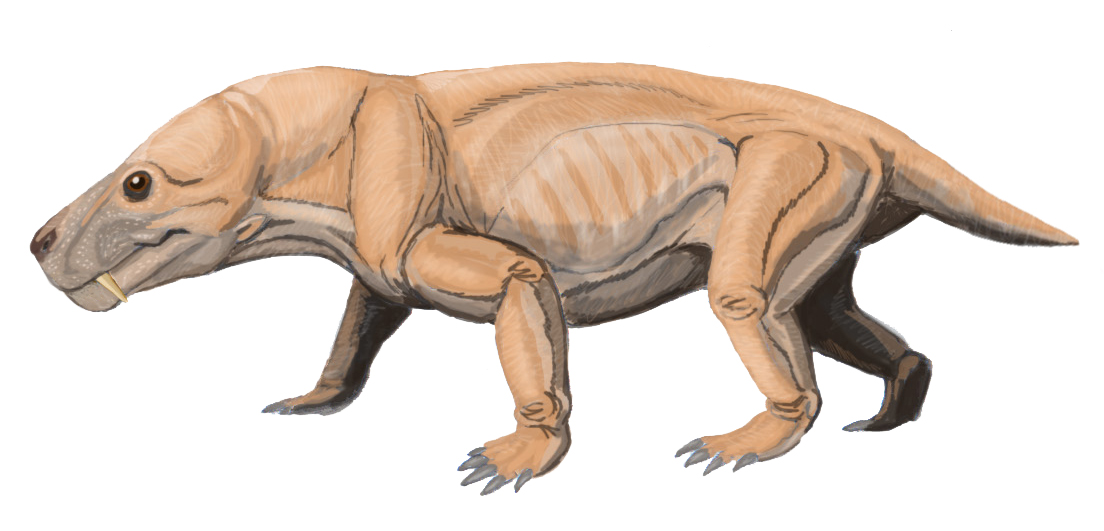
Life restoration of Moschorhinus kitchingi.

The first family-level name used to classify an akidnognathid was Euchambersidae, erected by South African paleontologist Lieuwe Dirk Boonstra in 1934, in reference for the genus Euchambersia, which is possibly one of the oldest known venomous tetrapods. Noting that the taxon is written in improper Latin, German paleontologist Friedrich von Huene changed the spelling of the name to Euchambersiidae in 1940. The taxon Akidnognathidae was first named in 1954 by South African paleontologists Haughton and Adrian Smuts Brink, basing their proposal on Akidnognathinae, which was created in 1928 by Ferenc Nopcsa. Nopcsa originally established Akidnognathinae as a subfamily of the Scaloposauridae, which currently appears to be a wastebasket taxon. In the classification of Haughton and Brink, the akidnognathids includes several therocephalians still recognized as such as well as several other genera, now classified as scylacosaurids. English and American paleontologists D. M. S. Watson and Alfred Romer moved many of these therocephalians into the family Whaitsiidae in 1956, although many were moved back to Akidnognathidae in later years.

In 1974, Christiane Mendrez established the family Moschorhinidae, while recognizing three subfamilies making it up, namely Annatherapsidinae, Moschorhininae and Euchambersiinae. In 1975, the same author proposed another name to designate the group, Annatherapsididae, although she maintained the validity of the three subfamilies previously cited. In their phylogenetic revision of therapsids published in 1986, James Hopson and Herb Barghusen supported Mendrez's hypothesis that the group included three subfamilies, but both authors preferred to use the name Euchambersiidae instead. While the name Euchambersiidae may have priority over Akidnognathidae because it was named first, Akidnognathidae is currently considered as the valid name because it is based on the first named genus of the group, Akidnognathus, this latter having been named in 1918 while Euchambersia was named in 1931. It is on the basis of this affirmation that this name has achieved wider acceptance within the scientific literature. In 1974, Leonid Petrovich Tatarinov proposed uniting the Akidnognathidae (then named Annatherapsididae), the Whaitsiidae and the Moschowhaitsiidae within a superfamily called Whaitsioidea. Multiple authors have disagreed with this proposition, but others like Mikhail Ivakhnenko in 2008 and Adam Huttenlocker in 2009, share Tatarinov's point of view. However, phylogenies led by Huttenlocker and Christian Sidor found that the Akidnognathidae was instead closest to the Chthonosauridae, with the two forming the sister group to the group containing the Whaitsioidea and the Baurioidea. Subsequent classifications published after this study tend to follow this pattern.

The cladogram below follows a phylogenetic analysis led by Jun Liu and Fernando Abdala in 2022, largely sharing the topology recovered by Huttenlocker and Sidor:

- Therocephalia
  - Lycosuchus
  - - Gorynychus
    - Scylacosauria
      - Scylacosauridae
      - Eutherocephalia
        - Scylacosuchus
        - - - Whaitsioidea
              - Ophidostoma
              - - - Hofmeyria
                  - - Ictidostoma
                    - Mirotenthes
                - Whaitsiidae
            - Baurioidea
          - - Chthonosauridae
            - Akidnognathidae
              - Annatherapsidus
              - - Shiguaignathus
                - - Jiufengia
                  - - USNM PAL 412421
                    - - Akidnognathus
                      - - - Olivierosuchus
                          - Promoschorhynchus
                        - - - Moschorhinus
                            - Cerdosuchoides
                          - Euchambersia

== Distribution ==
Akidnognathids are known from various fossils identified in Russia, South Africa and China. However, a skull from an undescribed taxon was identified in the Fremouw Formation, Antarctica, and is dated to the Lower Triassic.
