= Naobaogou Formation =

Geological formation in Daqing Mountains, China

- Stratigraphic range: Lopingian?
- Type: Geological formation
- Sub-units: Members I-III
- Underlies: Laowopu Formation
- Overlies: Shiyewan Formation
- Thickness: More than 1000 m

Lithology
- Primary: Siltstone
- Other: Conglomerate

Location
- Coordinates: 40.7°N 110.4°E
- Region: Inner Mongolia
- Country: China
- Extent: Daqing Mountains
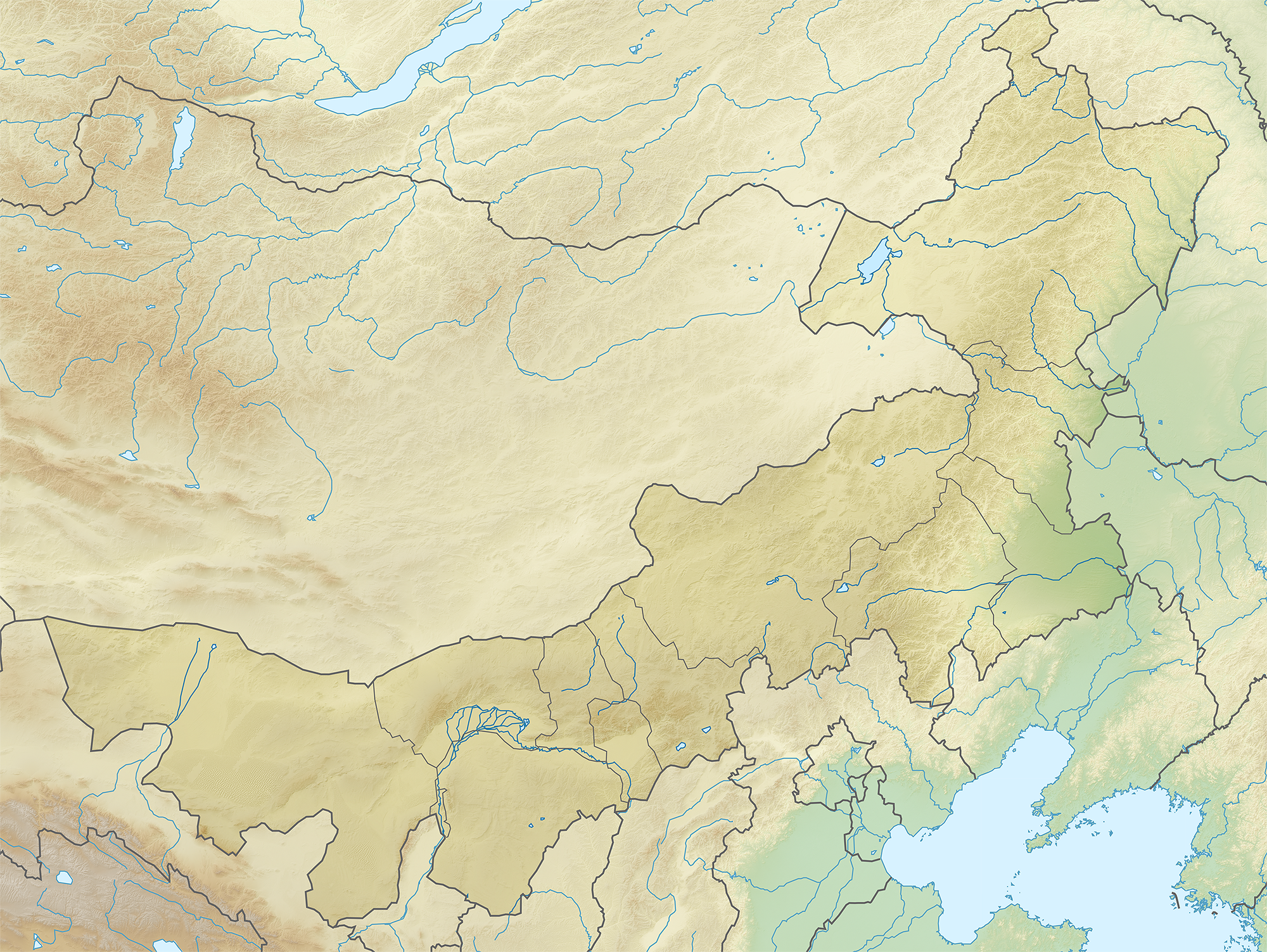
- Naobaogou Formation (China) Naobaogou Formation (Inner Mongolia) Location of Naobaogou formation

The Naobaogou Formation is a geological formation in the Daqing Mountains of China. It is likely of Lopingian (Late Permian) age. It consists of three rhythms of sediment, labeled members I-III primarily of purple siltstone, but each with a thick basal conglomerate bed. It is notable for its fossil content, producing one of the most diverse Late Permian vertebrate faunas outside Russia and South Africa.

== Vertebrate fauna ==
Color key: Taxon / Reclassified taxon / Taxon falsely reported as present / Dubious taxon or junior synonym / Ichnotaxon / Ootaxon / Morphotaxon	Notes; Uncertain or tentative taxa are in small text; ~~crossed out~~ taxa are discredited.

=== Synapsids ===
==== Dicynodonts ====
Dicynodonts of the Naobaogou Formation
Genus	Species	Locality	Material	Notes	Images
Daqingshanodon	D. limbus		Skull	A dicynodont	
Dicynodontia	Indeterminate		Partial skulls	Five additional morphotypes in addition to Daqingshanodon and Turfanodon, two of which are closely related to the former taxon and three or four related to Jimusaria.	
Jimusaria	J. monanensis		Skulls, cervicals, scapula	A dicynodontoid dicynodont	
Turfanodon	T. jiufengensis		Relatively complete skeleton and skulls	A dicynodontoid dicynodont	

==== Therocephalians ====
Therocephalians of the Naobaogou Formation
Genus	Species	Locality	Material	Notes	Images
Caodeyao	C. liuyufengi		Partial skull, mandible, humerus	A eutherocephalian, closely related to Purlovia.	
Euchambersia	E. liuyudongi		Skull and lower jaw	An akidnognathid therocephalian	
Jiufengia	J. jiai		Partial skull and postcranial skeleton	An akidnognathid therocephalian	
Shiguaignathus	S. wangi		Partial skull	An akidnognathid therocephalian	

=== Pareiasaurs ===
Pareiasaurs of the Naobaogou Formation
Genus	Species	Locality	Material	Notes	Images
Elginia	E. wuyongae		Partial skull	A pareiasaur	
Yinshanosaurus	Y. angustus		Partial articulated skeleton and skull	A pareiasaur	

=== Reptiliomorphs ===
Reptiliomorphs of the Naobaogou Formation
Genus	Species	Locality	Material	Notes	Images
Gansurhinus	G. naobaogouensis		Relatively complete skeleton of an immature individual	A captorhinid	
Laosuchus	L. hun		Partial skull and postcranial skeleton	A chroniosuchian	
