= Gorochovetzia =

Gorochovetzia Temporal range: Late Permian

Scientific classification
- Kingdom: Animalia
- Phylum: Chordata
- Clade: Synapsida
- Clade: Therapsida
- Clade: †Therocephalia
- Family: †Hofmeyriidae
- Genus: †Gorochovetzia; Ivakhnenko, 2011

Type species
- †G. sennikovi Ivakhnenko, 2011

Extinct genus of therapsids from the Late Permian of Russia

Gorochovetzia is an extinct genus of therocephalian therapsids from the Late Permian of Russia. Fossils have been found in the Gorokhovetsky District of Vladimir Oblast. Gorochovetzia is a member of the family Hofmeyriidae. Its type and only species is G. sennikovi, named in 2011. The skull is short and very robust. The canine teeth are large, while those behind them have enlarged crowns and serrated edges. The lower jaw is deep and curved upward.
