= Pelictosuchus =

Pelictosuchus Temporal range: Late Permian

Scientific classification
- Domain: Eukaryota
- Kingdom: Animalia
- Phylum: Chordata
- Clade: Synapsida
- Clade: Therapsida
- Clade: †Therocephalia
- Family: †Akidnognathidae
- Genus: †Pelictosuchus; Broom, 1940

Type species
- †Pelictosuchus paucidens Broom, 1940

Extinct genus of therapsids from the Late Permian of South Africa

Pelictosuchus is an extinct genus of therocephalian therapsids from the Late Permian of South Africa. It is classified in the family Akidnognathidae. The type species Pelictosuchus paucidens was named by South African paleontologist Robert Broom in 1940 from the Dicynodon Assemblage Zone.

Pelictosuchus was once classified in the family Nanictidopidae. Pelictosuchus and other therocephalians traditionally classified as nanictidopids have thin postorbital bars forming the back margins of the eye sockets and parietal bones that form a low sagittal crest at the top of the skull. They were thought to be closely related to another family of therocephalians called Scaloposauridae, although they differed from scaloposaurids in having higher, narrower skulls. Pelictosuchus is no longer classified as a nanictidopid, and is instead considered a member of Akidnognathidae.
