= Ichibengops =

Ichibengops Temporal range: Late Permian

Scientific classification
- Kingdom: Animalia
- Phylum: Chordata
- Clade: Synapsida
- Clade: Therapsida
- Clade: †Therocephalia
- Clade: †Eutherocephalia
- Genus: †Ichibengops; Huttenlocker et al., 2015

Type species
- †Ichibengops munyamadziensis Huttenlocker et al., 2015

Extinct genus of therapsids from Zambia during the Late Permian

Ichibengops is an extinct genus of therocephalian therapsids known from the type species Ichibengops munyamadziensis, which lived in what is now Zambia during the Late Permian. Ichibengops was named in 2015 on the basis of fossils found in the Wuchiapingian-age Madumabisa Mudstone Formation in the Luangwa Basin. Therocephalians have been known from the Luangwa Basin for decades, yet Ichibengops was the first endemic Zambian therocephalian to have been described in detail. Phylogenetic analysis indicates that it is a basal member of the clade Eutherocephalia, lying just outside a clade containing hofmeyriids, whaitsiids, and baurioids. Ichibengops is the sister taxon of the Russian therocephalian Chthonosaurus; together they form one of several known African-Russian sister taxon pairs of eutherocephalians, which indicate that eutherocephalians could freely disperse across most of Pangea during the Late Permian. Like the fellow therocephalian Euchambersia, Ichibengops might have had venom glands, as evidenced by grooves above its teeth.
