= Zorillodontops =

Zorillodontops Temporal range: Early Triassic

Scientific classification
- Domain: Eukaryota
- Kingdom: Animalia
- Phylum: Chordata
- Clade: Synapsida
- Clade: Therapsida
- Clade: †Therocephalia
- Family: †Akidnognathidae
- Genus: †Zorillodontops
- Species: †Z. gracilis

Binomial name
- †Zorillodontops gracilis Cluver, 1969

Extinct genus of therapsids from the Early Triassic of South Africa

Zorillodontops is an extinct genus of therocephalian therapsids from the Early Triassic of South Africa.

== See also ==
- List of therapsids
