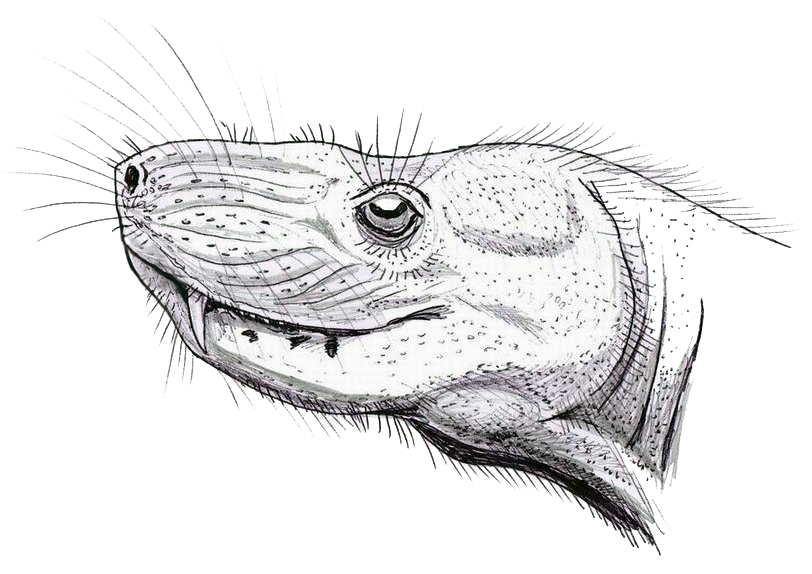

Scientific classification
- Kingdom: Animalia
- Phylum: Chordata
- Clade: Synapsida
- Clade: Therapsida
- Clade: †Therocephalia
- Superfamily: †Whaitsioidea
- Genus: †Hofmeyria; Broom, 1935

Type species
- Hofmeyria atavus Broom, 1935

= Hofmeyria =

Hofmeyria Temporal range: Wuchiapingian

Extinct genus of therapsids

Distinguished from the Late Permian junior synonym of Akidnognathus "Hofmeyria".

Hofmeyria is an extinct genus of therocephalians.

== See also ==
- List of therapsids
