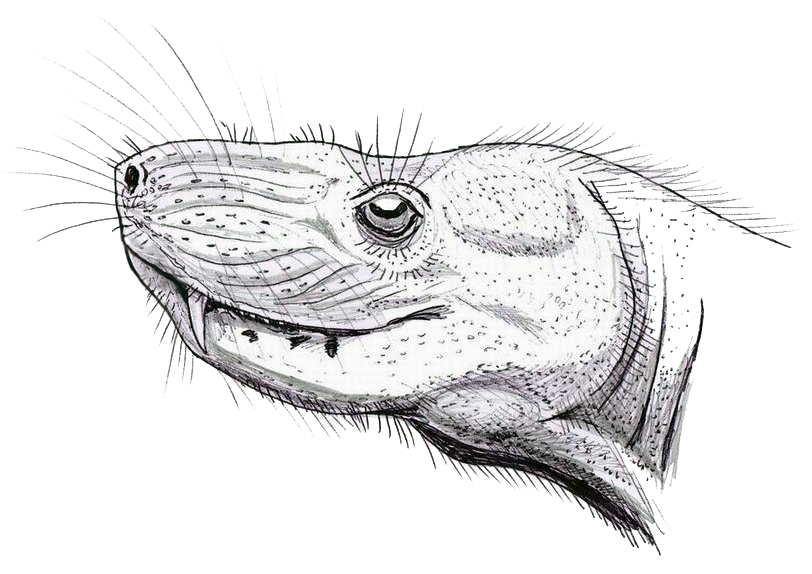

Scientific classification
- Kingdom: Animalia
- Phylum: Chordata
- Clade: Synapsida
- Clade: Therapsida
- Clade: †Therocephalia
- Clade: †Eutherocephalia
- Family: †Hofmeyriidae; Broom, 1935

Genera
- Gorochovetzia; Hofmeyria; Ictidostoma; Mirotenthes

= Hofmeyriidae =

Hofmeyriidae Temporal range: Permian

Extinct family of therapsids

Hofmeyriidae is a family of therocephalian therapsids. It includes the genus Ictidostoma and others.
