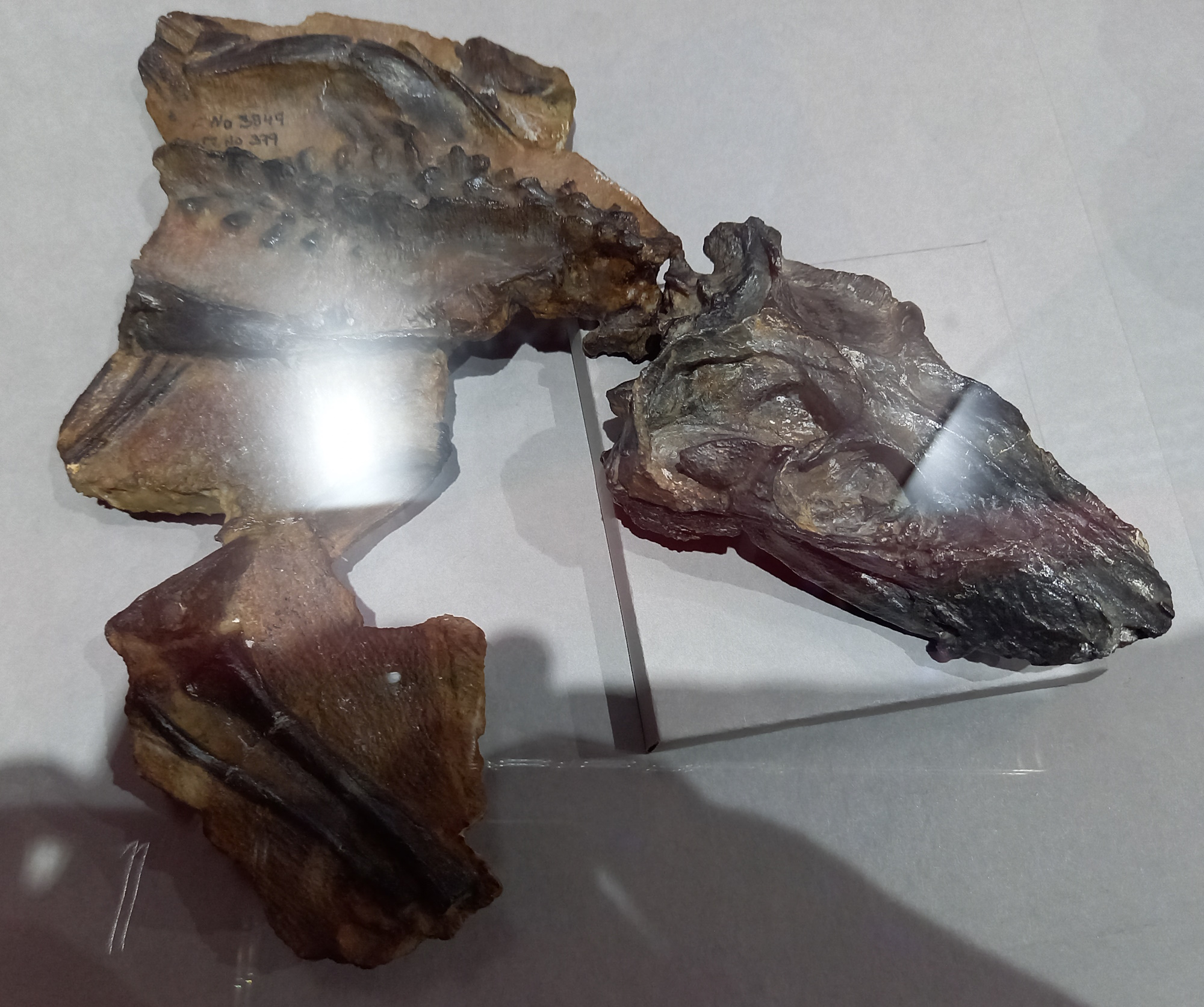
- Fossil specimen displayed at the Nagoya City Science Museum

Scientific classification
- Kingdom: Animalia
- Phylum: Chordata
- Clade: Synapsida
- Clade: Therapsida
- Clade: †Therocephalia
- Family: †Akidnognathidae
- Genus: †Olivierosuchus; Kammerer & Sidor, 2002

Species
- †O. parringtoni Brink, 1965 (type)

Synonyms
- †"Olivieria parringtoni" Brink, 1965

= Olivierosuchus =

Olivierosuchus Temporal range: Early Triassic

Extinct genus of therapsids from the early Triassic of South Africa

Olivierosuchus is an extinct genus of therocephalian therapsids. It is a member of the family Akidnognathidae. Fossils of Olivierosuchus have been found from the Early Triassic Lystrosaurus Assemblage Zone in South Africa. Unlike other akidnognathids such as Moschorhinus, it has a narrow snout and fewer postcanine teeth. As a distinguishing feature, Olivierosuchus also has a sharp ridge near the choana, an opening in the skull palate. Bumps and projections cover the pterygoid, a bone that forms part of the palate.

Olivierosuchus was a top predator of the lower Lystrosaurus Assemblage Zone (LAZ) and lived alongside other large therapsids like Moschorhinus. The high diversity of akidnognathids in the LAZ suggests that the group recovered quickly from the Permian-Triassic extinction event, a mass extinction in which many other therapsid groups disappeared.

A burrow cast described in 2010 from the LAZ has been attributed to Olivierosuchus or a related therocephalian. The burrow is straight and wide and includes an entry ramp and living chamber. Remains of a juvenile Lystrosaurus dicynodont were found in the cast, but the individual was likely too small to dig the burrow. It is possible that the burrow was home to an Olivierosuchus that had stashed the remains of the dicynodont as its prey in the tunnel. Carnivorous tetrapods typically create straight burrows and often store food in them, providing evidence for this interpretation of the South African burrow.
