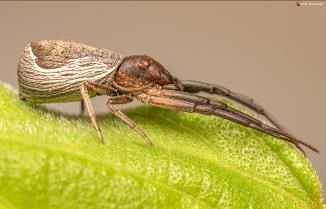
- Hewittia gracilis female in lateral view, South Africa

Scientific classification
- Kingdom: Animalia
- Phylum: Arthropoda
- Subphylum: Chelicerata
- Class: Arachnida
- Order: Araneae
- Infraorder: Araneomorphae
- Family: Thomisidae
- Genus: Hewittia; Lessert, 1928
- Species: H. gracilis

Binomial name
- Hewittia gracilis Lessert, 1928

= Hewittia =

Monotypic genus of spiders

Hewittia is a monotypic genus of African crab spiders containing the single species, Hewittia gracilis. It was first described by Roger de Lessert in 1928.

== Description ==
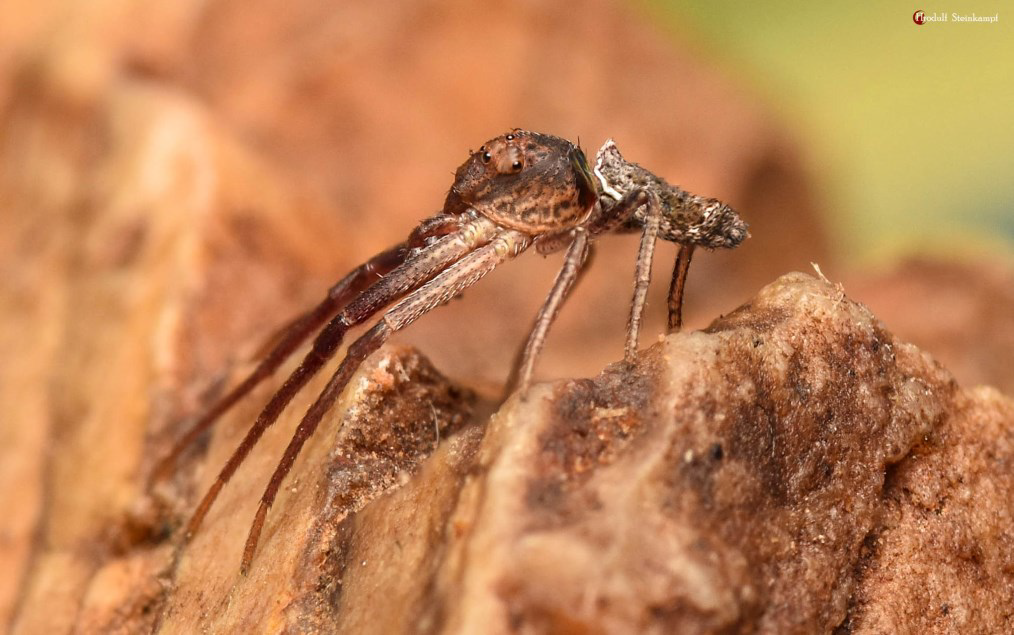
Hewittia gracilis male in lateral view, South Africa

Female H. gracilis have a total length of 3–4 millimetres (0.12–0.16 in), with both the prosoma (cephalothorax) opisthosoma (abdomen) being longer than wide. Colouration of the opisthosoma varies from greyish-white with two dark spots to almost entirely brown, though always with a thin white band circling the dorsal carapace. The prosoma is high and rounded in front and slopes forwards, while the rear edge is bluntly truncated.

The eyes are arranged in two rows, the anterior (front row) slightly wider than the posterior (back row), with the lateral eyes of both being three times larger than the median eyes. Like other crab spiders the front two pairs of legs are much longer than the hind pair.

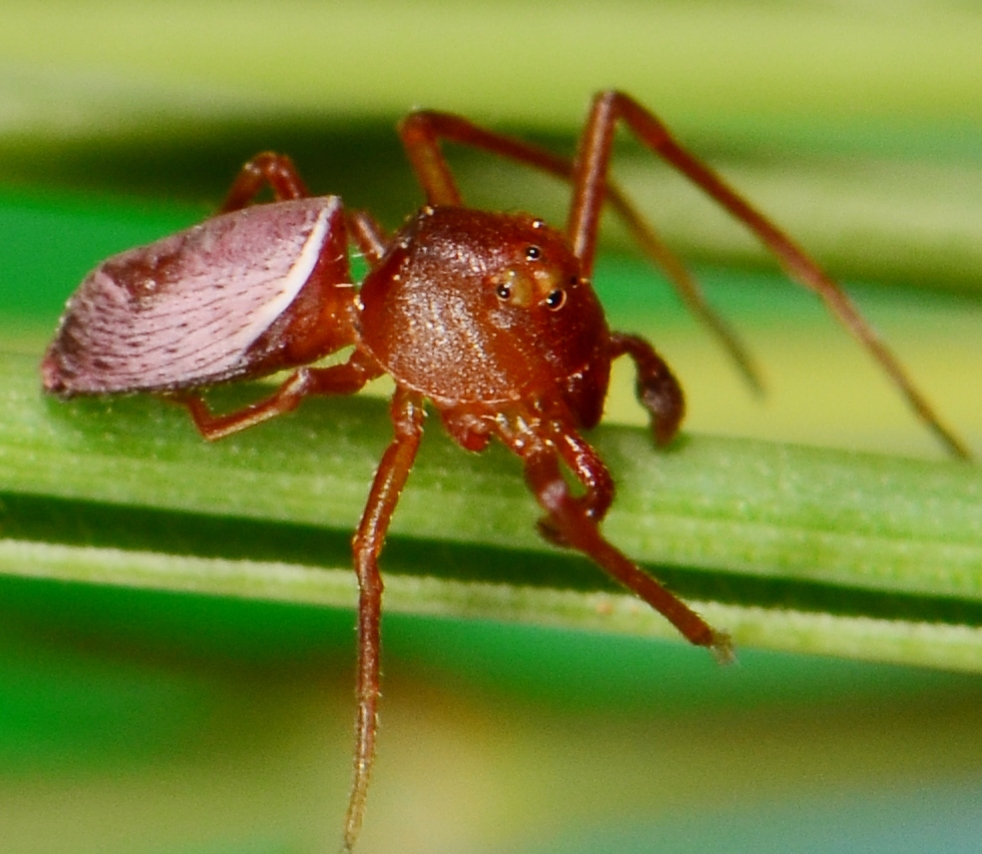
male

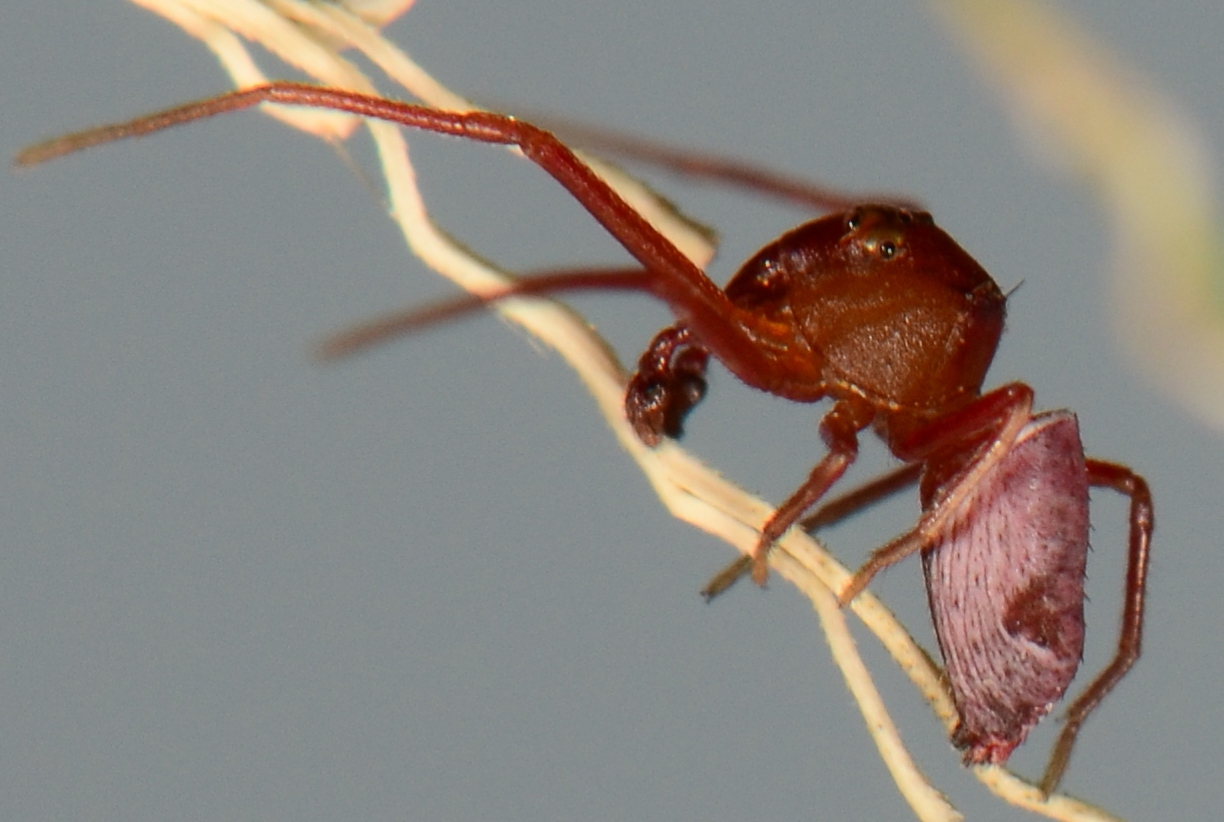
male

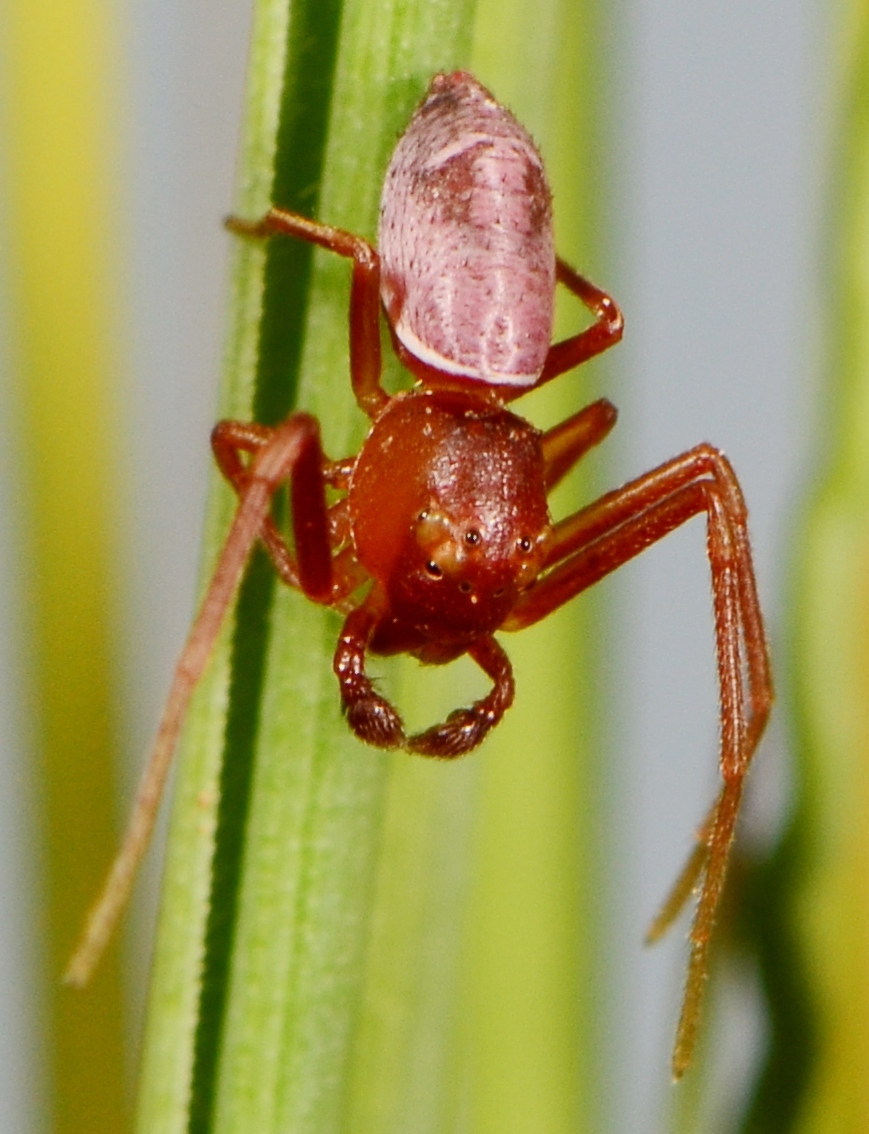
male

== Habitat ==
H. gracilis live in low vegetation, including shrubs and grasses, and are typically active during day.

== Distribution ==
H. gracilis was originally described from the Democratic Republic of Congo, and has since been found in the Ivory Coast, Namibia and South Africa.

== See also ==
- List of Thomisidae species
