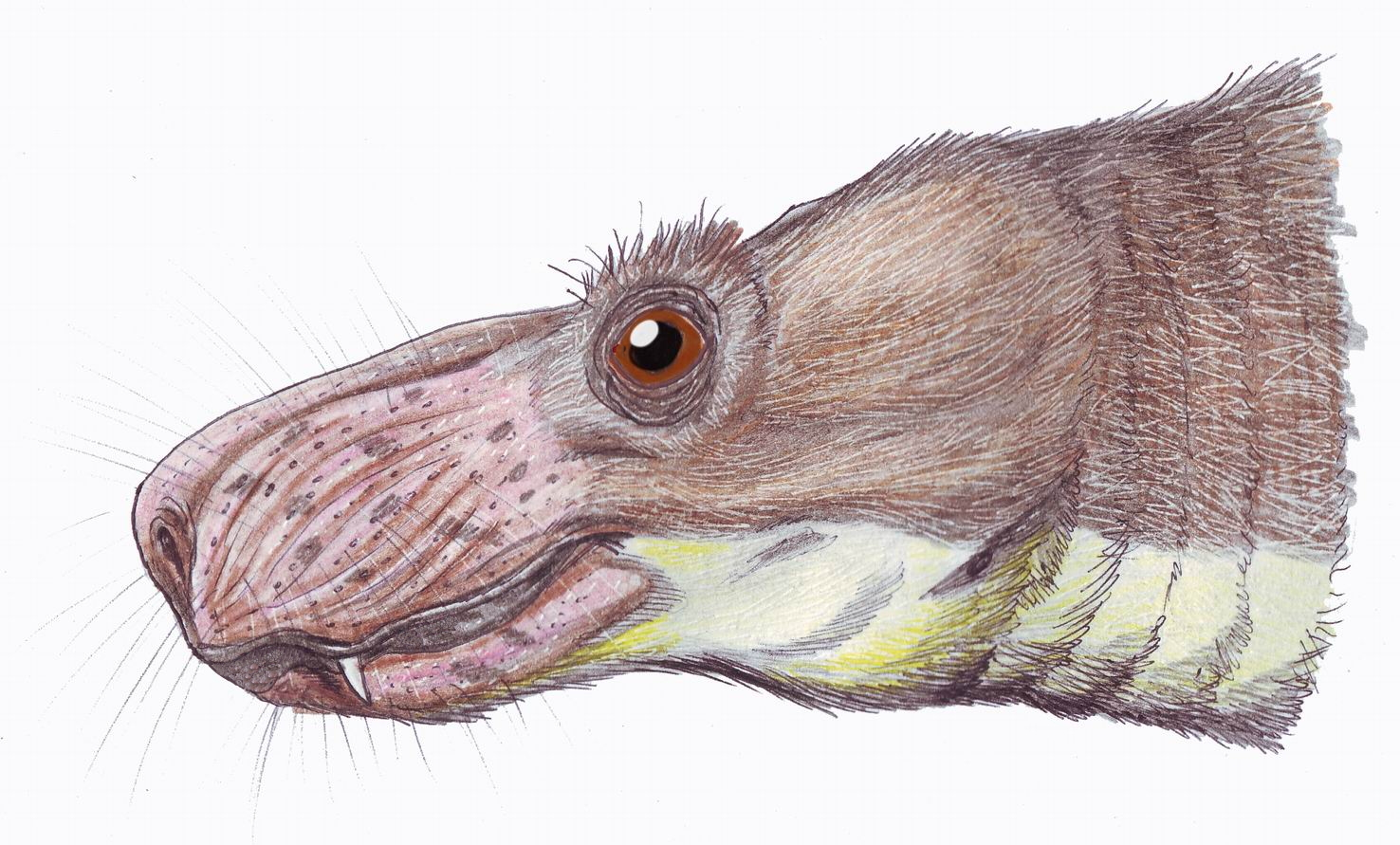

Scientific classification
- Kingdom: Animalia
- Phylum: Chordata
- Clade: Synapsida
- Clade: Therapsida
- Clade: †Therocephalia
- Family: †Akidnognathidae
- Genus: †Annatherapsidus; Kuhn, 1961

Type species
- †Annatherapsidus petri Kuhn, 1961

Species
- †A. petri (Amalitzky, 1922 [originally Anna petri]) (type); †A. postum Ivachnenko, 2011.

Synonyms
- Anna Amalitzky, 1922 (preoccupied Risso, 1826)

= Annatherapsidus =

Annatherapsidus Temporal range: Late Permian (Wuchiapingian-Changhsingian) ~256–251.9 Ma

Extinct genus of mammals

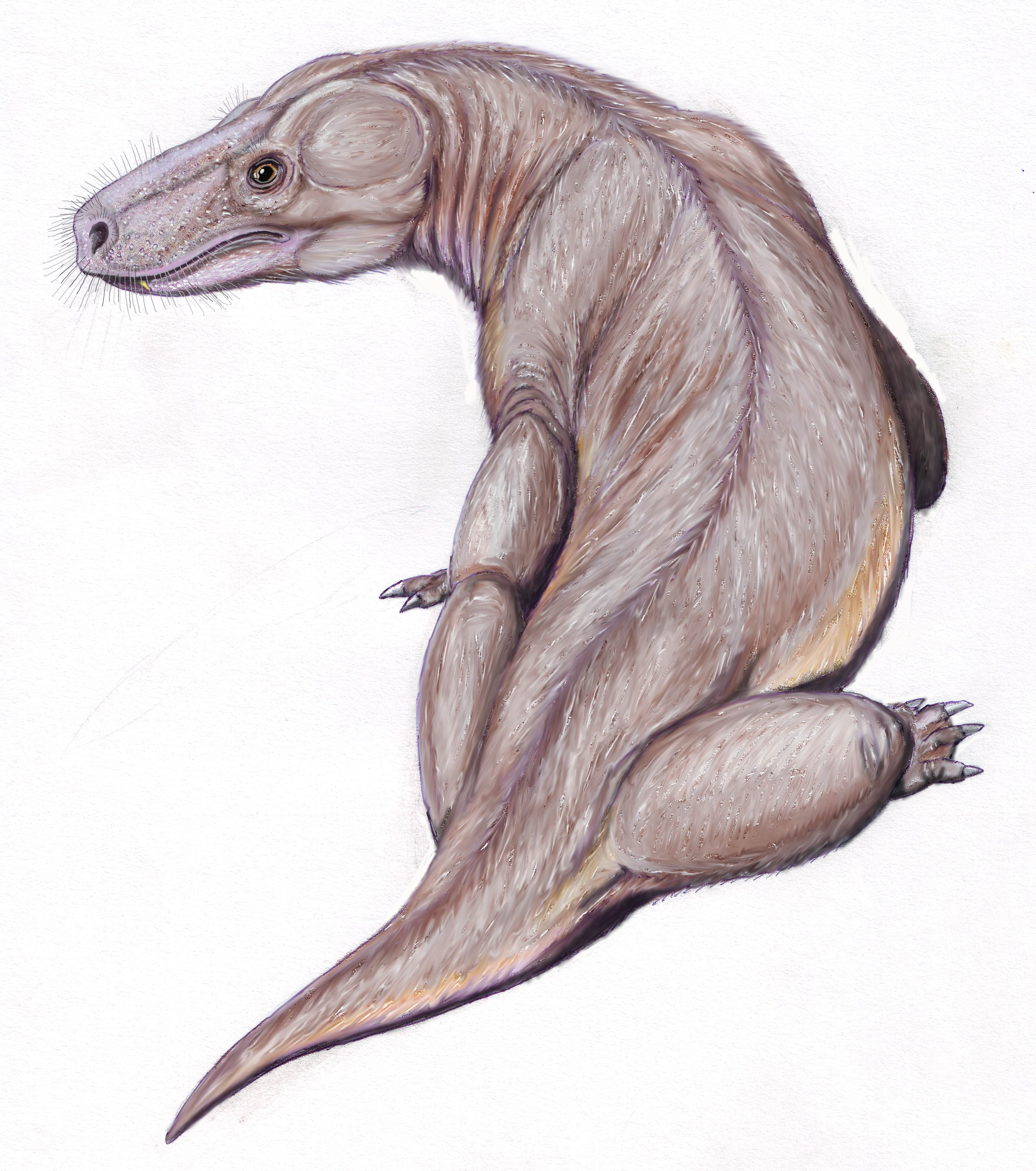
Restoration

Annatherapsidus is an extinct genus of therocephalians from the Upper Permian of Russia. It was a fairly small animal with a length of 91 cm and a 22 cm skull. It was originally named Anna petri, but the genus name was already taken, so it was renamed to Annatherapsidus.

== See also ==
- List of therapsids
