= Promoschorhynchus =

Promoschorhynchus Temporal range: Late Permian - Early Triassic

Scientific classification
- Domain: Eukaryota
- Kingdom: Animalia
- Phylum: Chordata
- Clade: Synapsida
- Clade: Therapsida
- Clade: †Therocephalia
- Family: †Akidnognathidae
- Genus: †Promoschorhynchus; Brink, 1954

Species
- †P. platyrhinus Brink, 1954 (type)

Genus of therapsids from the Late Permian and Early Triassic of South Africa

Promoschorhynchus is a genus of akidnognathid therocephalians from the Late Permian and Early Triassic of South Africa. Unlike many other therapsids, Promoschorhynchus survived the Permian-Triassic extinction event.
