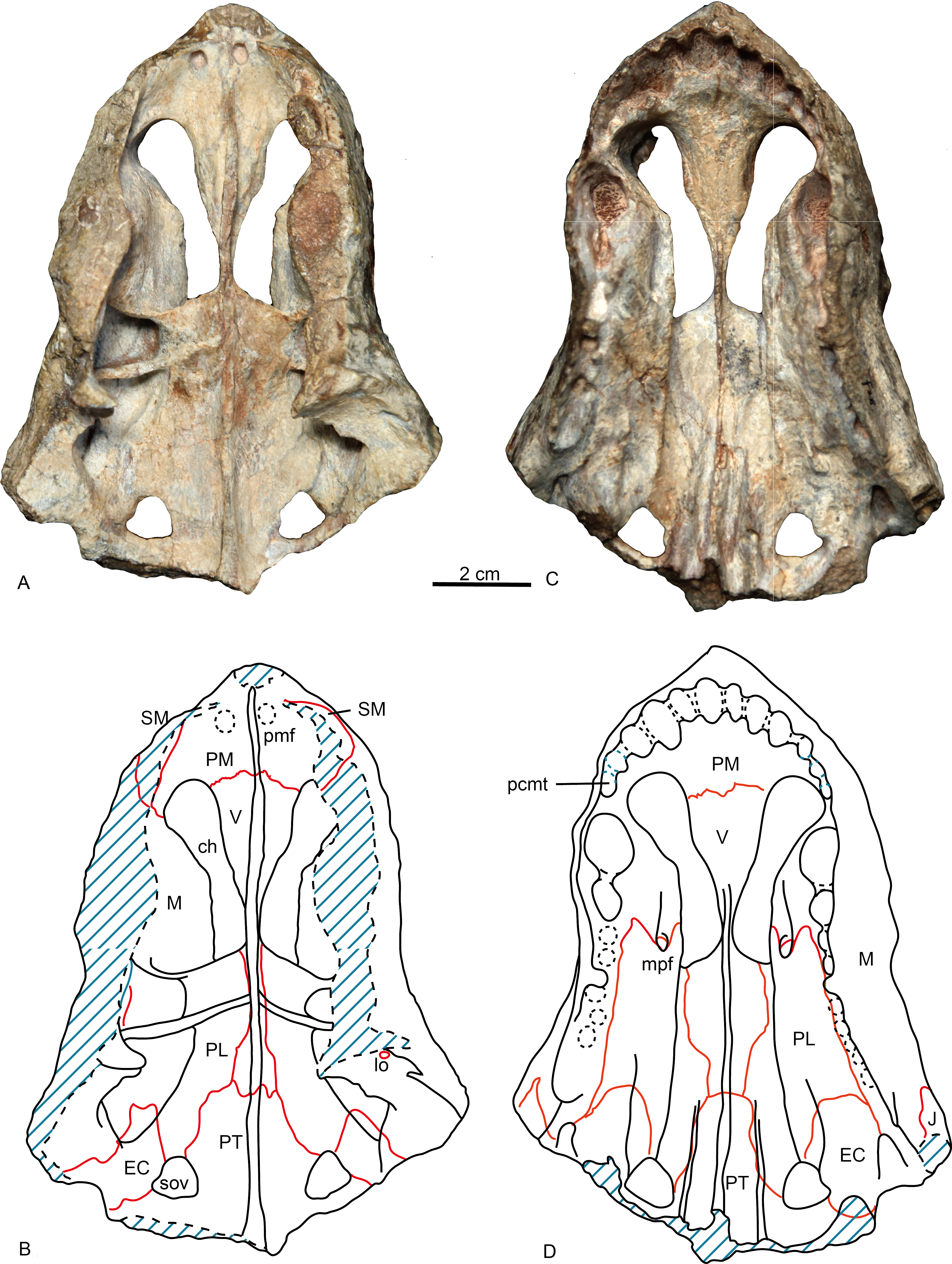
- Holotype skull shown from above and below

Scientific classification
- Kingdom: Animalia
- Phylum: Chordata
- Clade: Synapsida
- Clade: Therapsida
- Clade: †Therocephalia
- Family: †Akidnognathidae
- Genus: †Shiguaignathus; Liu & Abdala, 2017
- Species: †S. wangi

Binomial name
- †Shiguaignathus wangi Liu & Abdala, 2017

= Shiguaignathus =

Shiguaignathus Temporal range: Lopingian

Extinct genus of therapsid from Late Permian China

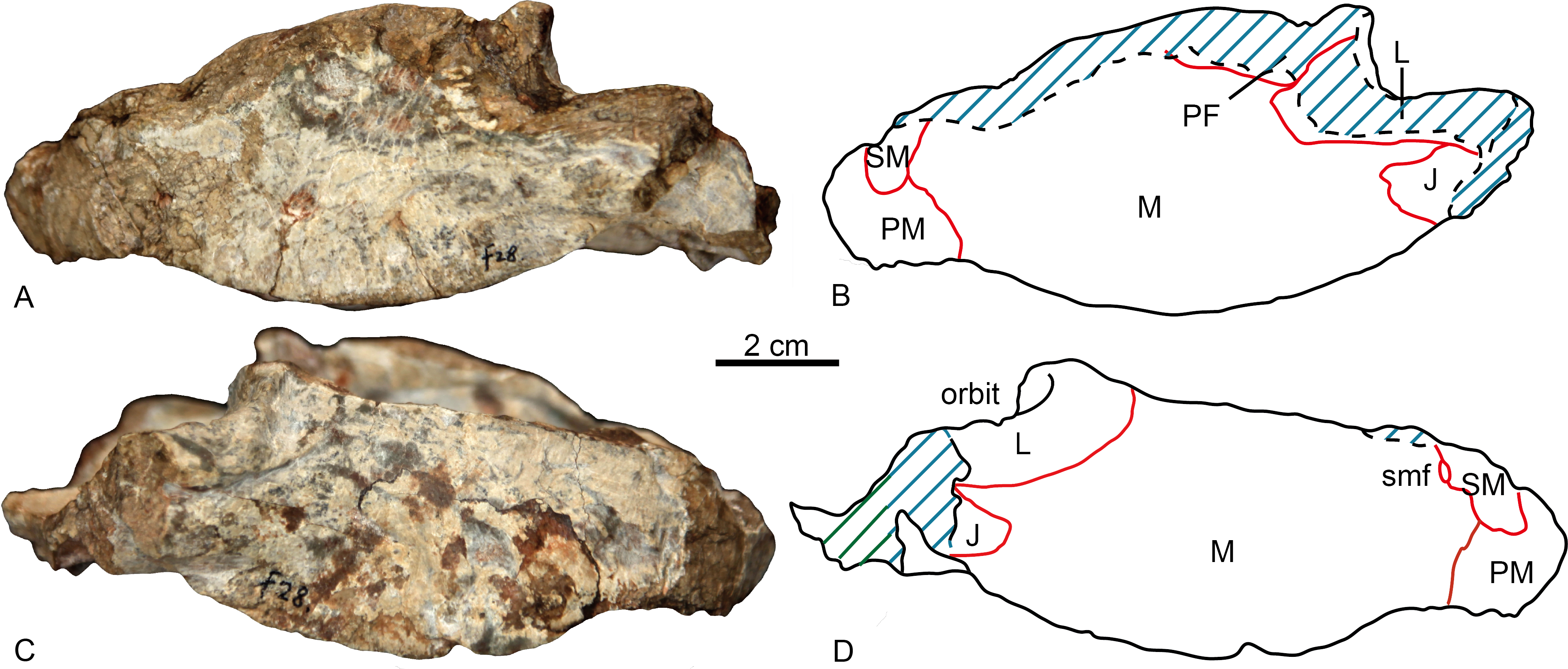
Skull shown from the sides

Shiguaignathus is an extinct genus of therocephalian therapsid that lived in what is now China during the Late Permian. It was found in the Naobaogou Formation and is known from a partial skull. It was found to be a basal member of Akidnognathidae.

== See also ==
- List of synapsids
