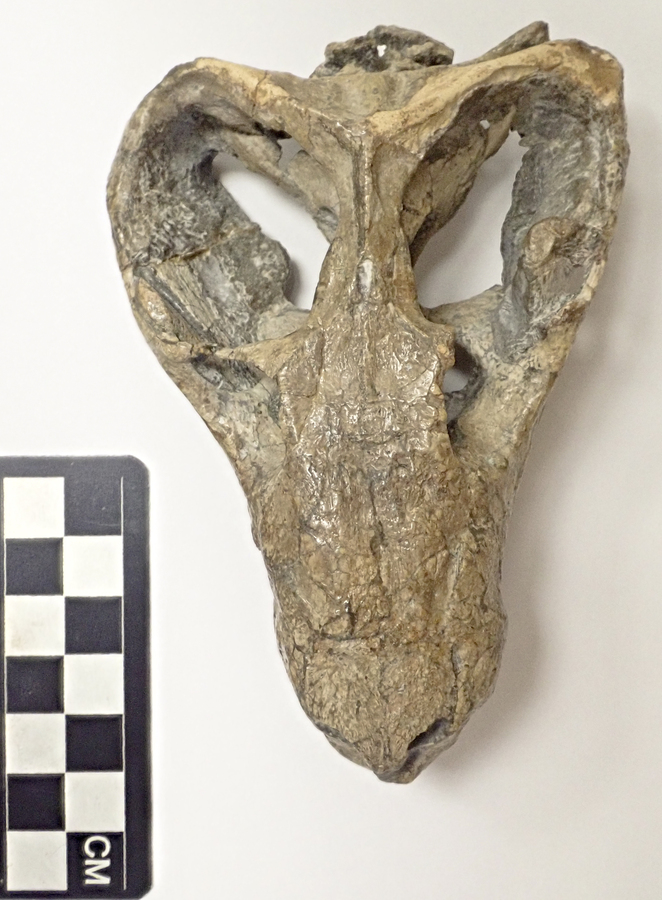

Scientific classification
- Kingdom: Animalia
- Phylum: Chordata
- Clade: Synapsida
- Clade: Therapsida
- Clade: †Therocephalia
- Superfamily: †Whaitsioidea
- Genus: †Mirotenthes; J. Attridge 1956

Type species
- Mirotenthes digitipes

= Mirotenthes =

Mirotenthes Temporal range: 259.9 – 254.17 Ma

Genus of therocephalian

Mirotenthes digitipes is a genus of therocephalian known from the Late Permian Cistecephalus Assemblage Zone of South Africa.

== Description ==
Mirotenthes had long bones possessing very thick bone walls for its relatively small size.
