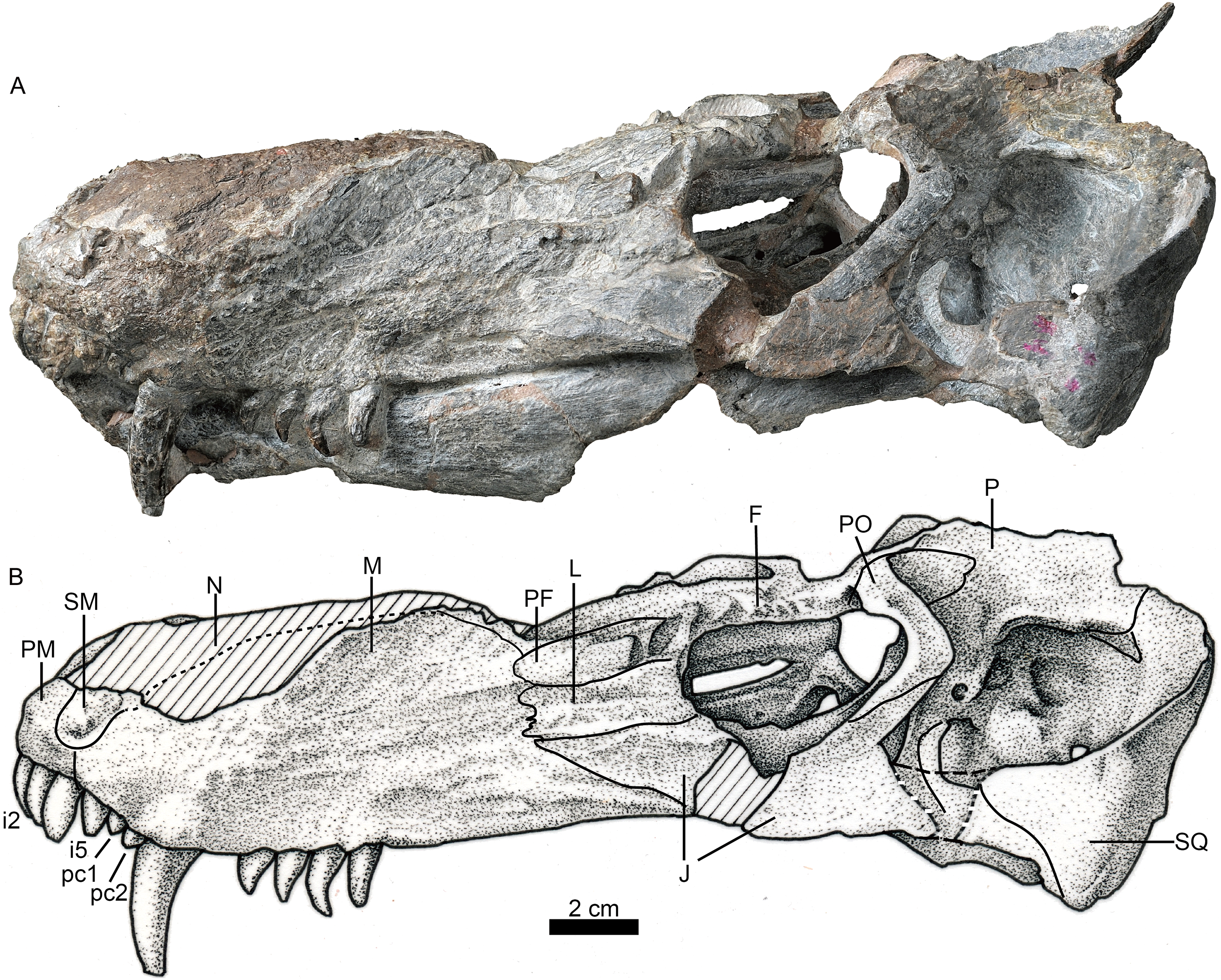

Scientific classification
- Kingdom: Animalia
- Phylum: Chordata
- Clade: Synapsida
- Clade: Therapsida
- Clade: †Therocephalia
- Family: †Akidnognathidae
- Genus: †Jiufengia; Liu & Abdala, 2019

Type species
- Jiufengia jiai Liu & Abdala, 2019

= Jiufengia =

Jiufengia Temporal range: Late Permian

Extinct genus of therocephalian

Jiufengia is an extinct genus of therocephalian in the family Akidnognathidae. It is known from a single species, Jiufengia jiai, from the Late Permian Naobaogou Formation in China.
