= Polycynodon =

Polycynodon Temporal range: Late Permian

Scientific classification
- Domain: Eukaryota
- Kingdom: Animalia
- Phylum: Chordata
- Clade: Synapsida
- Clade: Therapsida
- Clade: †Therocephalia
- Superfamily: †Baurioidea
- Genus: †Polycynodon; Broom and Robinson, 1948

Type species
- †Polycynodon elegans (Broom, 1940) (originally Octocynodon elegans)

Extinct genus of therapsids from the Late Permian of South Africa

Polycynodon is an extinct genus of therocephalians from the Late Permian of South Africa. It is known from the Cistecephalus Assemblage Zone. The type species was first described as Octocynodon elegans by South African paleontologist Robert Broom in 1940, but the name Octocynodon was preoccupied by a genus of labrid fish first described in 1904. Along with John T. Robinson, Broom instated Polycynodon as a replacement name for O. elegans in 1948. Polycynodon is classified in Baurioidea, although its relationship to other baurioid therocephalians is uncertain.
