= Akidnognathus =

Scientific classification
- Domain: Eukaryota
- Kingdom: Animalia
- Phylum: Chordata
- Clade: Synapsida
- Clade: Therapsida
- Clade: †Therocephalia
- Family: †Akidnognathidae
- Genus: †Akidnognathus; Haughton, 1918

Extinct genus of therapsids

Akidnognathus is an extinct genus of therocephalians.

== See also ==
- List of therapsids
