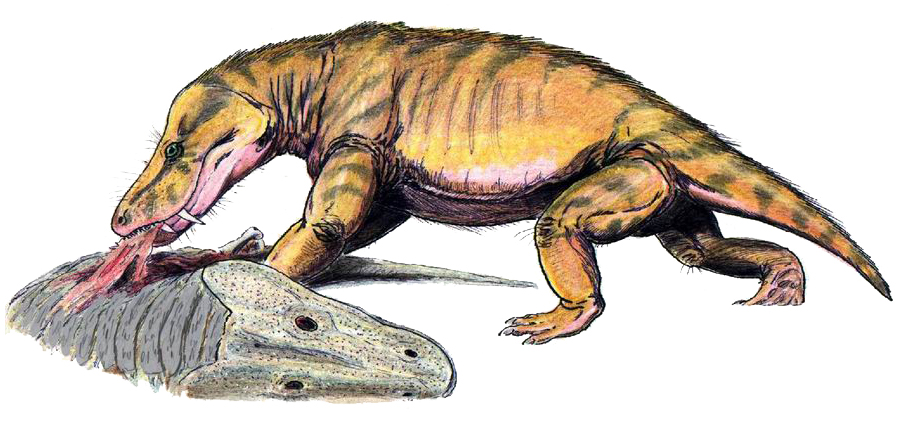
- Restoration of Scylacosuchus

Scientific classification
- Domain: Eukaryota
- Kingdom: Animalia
- Phylum: Chordata
- Clade: Synapsida
- Clade: Therapsida
- Clade: †Therocephalia
- Clade: †Eutherocephalia
- Genus: †Scylacosuchus; Tatarinov, 1968

Type species
- †Scylacosuchus orenburgensis Tatarinov, 1968

= Scylacosuchus =

Scylacosuchus Temporal range: Late Permian (Lopingian)

Extinct genus of therapsids from Permian Russia

Scylacosuchus is an extinct genus of therocephalian therapsids. It was a predatory eutherocephalian that lived in Lopingian epoch. Its fossils were found in Orenburg Oblast of Russia. The type species is Scylacosuchus orenburgensis.
