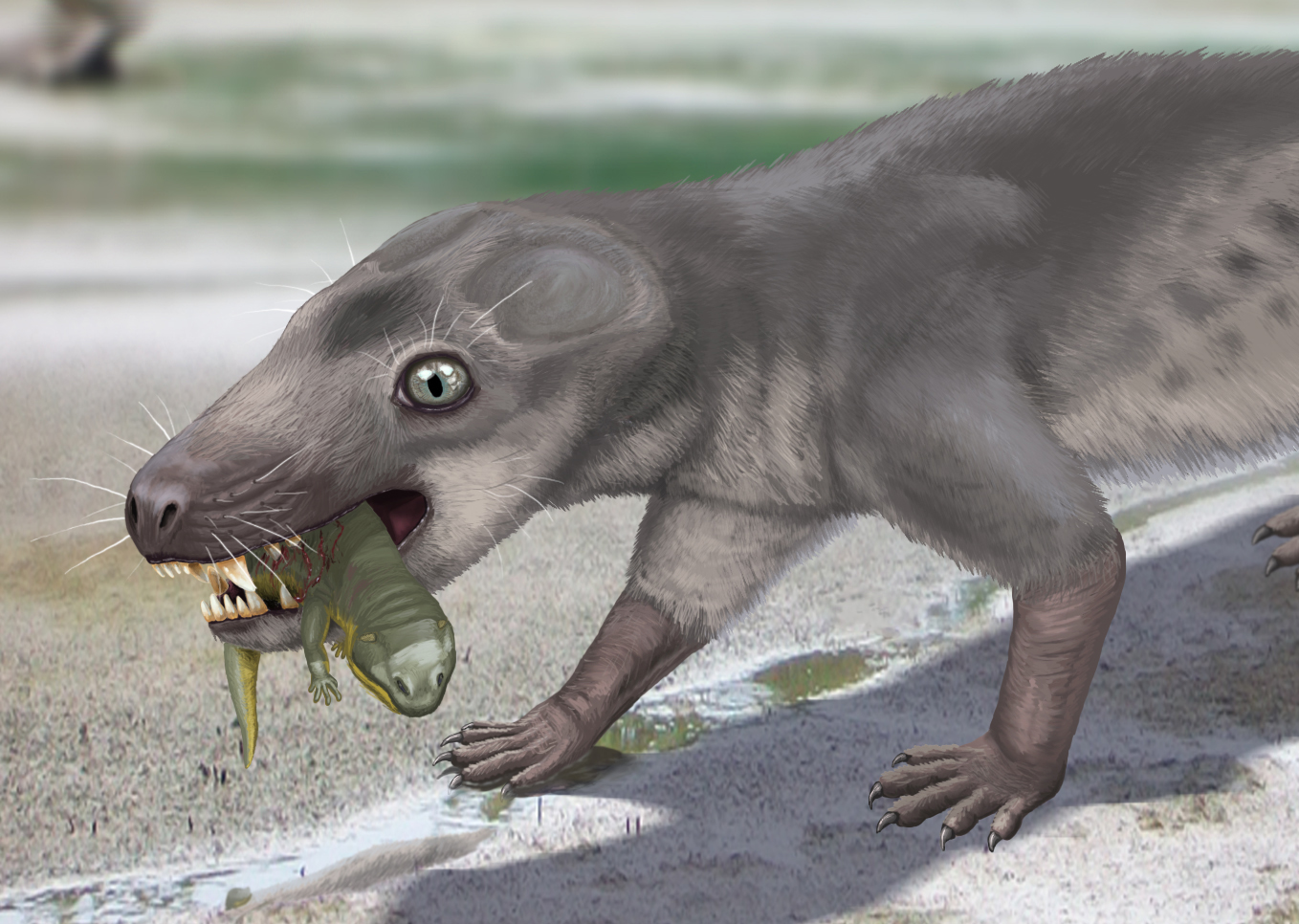
- Life restoration of Chthonosaurus velocidens

Scientific classification
- Kingdom: Animalia
- Phylum: Chordata
- Clade: Synapsida
- Clade: Therapsida
- Clade: †Therocephalia
- Clade: †Eutherocephalia
- Genus: †Chthonosaurus; Vjuschkov 1955

Type species
- †Chthonosaurus velocidens Vjuschkov 1955

= Chthonosaurus =

Chthonosaurus Temporal range: Late Permian ~260–253 Ma

Extinct genus of therapsids from the Late Permian of Russia

Chthonosaurus is an extinct genus of eutherocephalian therapsids from the Late Permian Kutulukskaya Formation of Russia. The type species Chthonosaurus velocidens was named in 1955.
