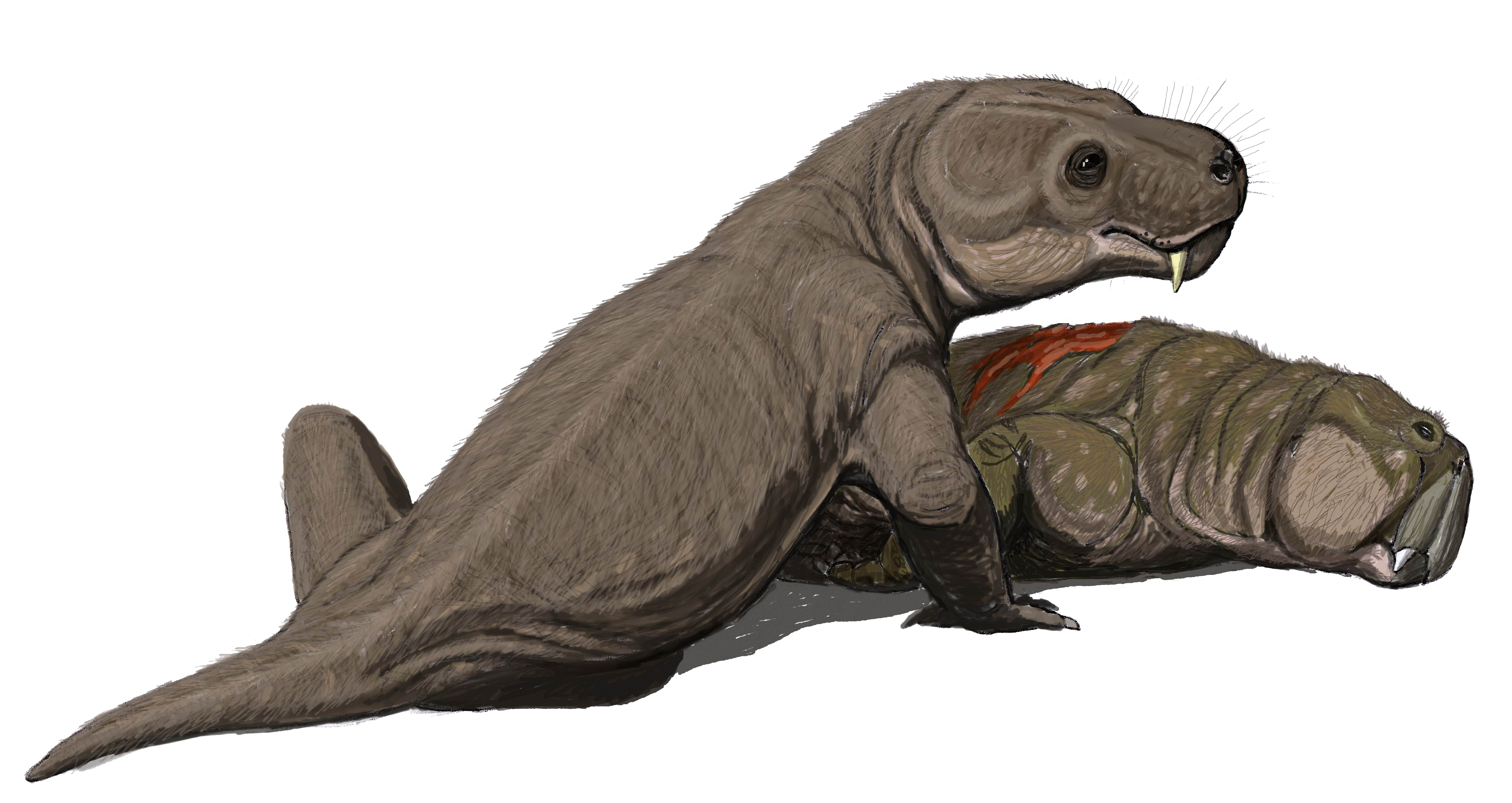
- Life restoration of the eutherocephalian Moschorhinus preying on the dicynodont Lystosaurus.

Scientific classification
- Kingdom: Animalia
- Phylum: Chordata
- Clade: Synapsida
- Clade: Therapsida
- Clade: †Therocephalia
- Clade: †Scylacosauria
- Clade: †Eutherocephalia; Hopson and Barghusen, 1986

Families and genera
- Caodeyao; Nanictidops; Perplexisaurus; Purlovia; Scylacosuchus; Akidnognathidae; Baurioidea; Chthonosauridae; Chthonosaurus; Ichibengops; Whaitsioidea; Ophidostoma; Hofmeyriidae; Whaitsiidae

= Eutherocephalia =

Eutherocephalia Temporal range: Middle Permian—Middle Triassic, 266–242 Ma

Extinct clade of therapsids

Eutherocephalia ("true beast head") is an extinct clade of advanced therocephalian therapsids. Eutherocephalians are distinguished from the lycosuchids and scylacosaurids, two early therocephalian families. While lycosuchids and scyalosaurids became extinct by the earliest Late Permian period, eutherocephalians persisted to the end of the Permian and managed to survived the Permian–Triassic extinction event. The group eventually became extinct in the Middle Triassic.

== Characteristics ==
The Eutherocephalians evolved several mammal-like traits through convergent evolution with Cynodontia. Among those traits were the loss of palatine teeth and the reduction of the parietal eye. The latter organ is instrumental in thermoregulation among lizards and snakes, indicating both eutherocephalians and cynodonts were evolving toward a more active, homeothermic lifestyle, though the eye never fully disappeared in the eutherocephalians.

== Classification ==
The clade Eutherocephalia contains the majority of therocephalians, yet the phylogenetic relations of the groups within it remain unclear. Eutherocephalia is supported as a true clade in many phylogenetic analyses, but the placement of groups like Akidnognathidae, Hofmeyriidae, Whaitsiidae, and Baurioidea, all of which lie within Eutherocephalia, remains debated.
