= 2017 in paleontology =

Paleontology or palaeontology is the study of prehistoric life forms on Earth through the examination of plant and animal fossils. This includes the study of body fossils, tracks (ichnites), burrows, cast-off parts, fossilised feces (coprolites), palynomorphs and chemical residues. Because humans have encountered fossils for millennia, paleontology has a long history both before and after becoming formalized as a science. This article records significant discoveries and events related to paleontology that occurred or were published in the year 2017.

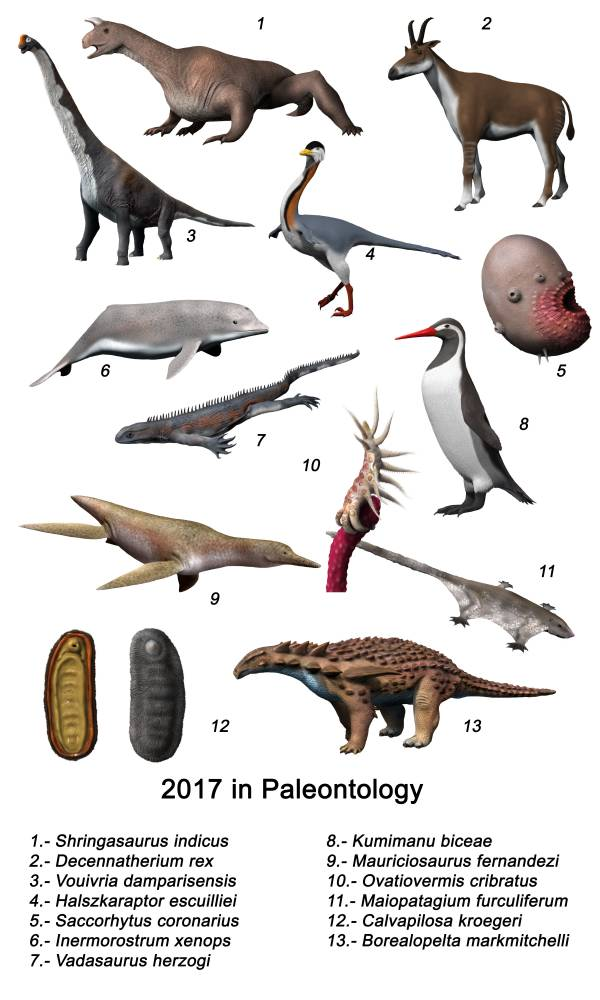
Important taxa described (but not necessarily validly named) in 2017

== Cnidarians ==
=== Research ===
- Ou et al. (2017) consider early Cambrian species Galeaplumosus abilus and Chengjiangopenna wangii to be junior synonyms of Xianguangia sinica, interpret fossils attributed to members of these species as parts of the same organism and consider X. sinica to be likely stem-cnidarian.
- Pseudooides prima is interpreted as a cnidarian and a senior synonym of Hexaconularia sichuanensis by Duan et al. (2017).
- Fossilized cnidarian medusae are described from the Cambrian Zabriskie Quartzite (California, United States) by Sappenfield, Tarhan & Droser (2017), representing the oldest macrofossil evidence of cnidarian medusae from the Phanerozoic reported so far.
- A study on the morphology of phosphatic tubes of Sphenothallus from the Early Ordovician Fenxiang Formation (China), as well as the Silurian and Early Devonian of Podolia (Ukraine), and its implications for the evolution of symmetry in the body plan of cnidarians is published by Dzik, Baliński & Sun (2017).
- A study on the succession of coral assemblages through the Ordovician–Silurian transition in South China is published by Wang et al. (2017).
- A study on the extant and fossil stony corals, intending to determine whether fossil corals lived in symbiosis with photosynthesizing dinoflagellates, is published by Tornabene et al. (2017).

=== New taxa ===
Name	Novelty	Status	Authors	Age	Unit	Location	Notes	Images
Acanthophyllum filiforme	Sp. nov	Valid	Coen-Aubert	Devonian (Givetian)		Mauritania	A rugose coral belonging to the family Ptenophyllidae.	
Acanthophyllum sougyi	Sp. nov	Valid	Coen-Aubert	Devonian (Givetian)		Mauritania	A rugose coral belonging to the family Ptenophyllidae.	
Agetolites angullongensis	Sp. nov	Valid	Zhen, Wang & Percival	Late Ordovician	Angullong Formation	Australia	A tabulate coral.	
Aulohelia carbonica	Sp. nov	Valid	Niko & Fujikawa	Carboniferous (Viséan)	Akiyoshi Limestone Group	Japan	A tabulate coral.	
Bothrophyllum gorbachevensis	Sp. nov	Valid	Fedorowski	Carboniferous (Bashkirian)		Ukraine	A rugose coral belonging to the family Bothrophyllidae.	
Bothrophyllum kalmyussi	Sp. nov	Valid	Fedorowski	Carboniferous (Bashkirian)		Ukraine	A rugose coral belonging to the family Bothrophyllidae.	
Cambroctoconus koori	Sp. nov	Valid	Peel	Cambrian Stage 4 or Stage 5	Henson Gletscher Formation	Greenland	A possible member of Octocorallia.	
Charactophyllum mauritanicum	Sp. nov	Valid	Coen-Aubert	Devonian (Givetian)		Mauritania	A rugose coral belonging to the family Disphyllidae.	
Charactophyllum soraufi	Sp. nov	Valid	Coen-Aubert	Devonian (Givetian)		Mauritania	A rugose coral belonging to the family Disphyllidae.	
Dianqianophyllum	Gen. et sp. nov	Valid	Liao & Ma	Devonian (Givetian)		China	A rugose coral. Genus includes new species D. bianqingense.	
Dibunophylloides columnatus	Sp. nov	Valid	Fedorowski	Carboniferous (Bashkirian)		Ukraine	A rugose coral belonging to the family Aulophyllidae.	
Dibunophylloides paulus	Sp. nov	Valid	Fedorowski	Carboniferous (Bashkirian)		Ukraine	A rugose coral belonging to the family Aulophyllidae.	
Dibunophylloides similis	Sp. nov	Valid	Fedorowski	Carboniferous (Bashkirian)		Ukraine	A rugose coral belonging to the family Aulophyllidae.	
Dibunophyllum medium	Sp. nov	Valid	Fedorowski	Carboniferous (Bashkirian)		Ukraine	A rugose coral belonging to the family Aulophyllidae.	
Enniskillenia multiseptata	Sp. nov	Valid	Bamber & Rodríguez in Bamber et al.	Carboniferous (Mississippian)		Canada	A rugose coral.	
Fungiaphyllia	Gen. et sp. nov	Valid	Melnikova & Roniewicz	Early Jurassic (Hettangian/Sinemurian–Pliensbachian)		Afghanistan	A stony coral belonging to the family Latomeandridae. The type species is Fungiaphyllia communis.	
Gillismilia	Nom. nov	Valid	Lathuilière, Charbonnier & Pacaud	Early Jurassic (Pliensbachian)		France	A coral; a replacement name for Palaeocyathus Alloiteau (1956).	
Guembelastraea dronovi	Sp. nov	Valid	Melnikova & Roniewicz	Early Jurassic (Hettangian/Sinemurian)		Afghanistan	A stony coral belonging to the family Tropiastraeidae, a species of Guembelastraea.	
Lithostrotion termieri	Sp. nov	Valid	Rodríguez & Somerville in Rodríguez, Somerville & Said	Carboniferous (Viséan)	Azrou-Khenifra Basin	Morocco	A rugose coral belonging to the family Lithostrotionidae.	
Macgeea tourneuri	Sp. nov	Valid	Coen-Aubert	Devonian (Givetian)		Mauritania	A rugose coral belonging to the family Phillipsastreidae.	
Nina	Gen. et 3 sp. et comb. nov	Junior homonym	Fedorowski	Carboniferous (Serpukhovian and Bashkirian)		Ukraine	A rugose coral belonging to the family Bothrophyllidae. The type species is N. donetsiana; genus also includes new species N. dibimitaria and N. magna, as well as "Bothrophyllum" berestovensis Vassilyuk (1960). The generic name is preoccupied by Nina Horsfield (1829).	
Oppelismilia spectabilis	Sp. nov	Valid	Melnikova & Roniewicz	Early Jurassic (Hettangian/Sinemurian)		Afghanistan	A stony coral belonging to the family Oppelismiliidae, a species of Oppelismilia.	
Parepismilia dolichostoma	Sp. nov	Valid	Melnikova & Roniewicz	Early Jurassic (Hettangian–early Sinemurian)		Afghanistan	A stony coral belonging to the family Parepismiliidae, a species of Parepismilia.	
Parepismilia dronovi	Sp. nov	Valid	Melnikova & Roniewicz	Early Jurassic (Hettangian/Sinemurian)		Afghanistan	A stony coral belonging to the family Parepismiliidae, a species of Parepismilia.	
Periplacotrochus	Gen. et comb. et sp. nov	Valid	Cairns	Late Eocene to middle Miocene		Australia	A flabellid coral. Genus includes P. deltoideus (Duncan, 1864), P. corniculatus (Dennant, 1899), P. elongatus (Duncan, 1864), P. pueblensis (Dennant, 1903), P. inflectus (Dennant, 1903) and P. magnus (Dennant, 1904), as well as new species P. cudmorei.	
Petrophyllia niimiensis	Sp. nov	Valid	Niko, Suzuki & Taguchi	Miocene	Bihoku Group	Japan	A stony coral.	
Protomichelinia funafusensis	Sp. nov	Valid	Niko	Early Permian	Funafuseyama Limestone	Japan	A tabulate coral belonging to the order Favositida and the family Micheliniidae.	
Qinscyphus	Gen. et sp. nov	Valid	Liu et al.	Cambrian (Fortunian)	Kuanchuanpu Formation	China	A probable crown jellyfish belonging to the family Olivooidae. The type species is Q. necopinus.	
Rozkowskia lenta	Sp. nov	Valid	Fedorowski	Carboniferous (Bashkirian)		Ukraine	A rugose coral belonging to the family Aulophyllidae.	
Scoliopora hosakai	Sp. nov	Valid	Niko, Ibaraki & Tazawa	Middle Devonian		Japan	A tabulate coral belonging to the order Favositida and the family Alveolitidae.	
Sinaster	Gen. et sp. nov	Valid	Wang et al.	Early Cambrian	Kuanchuanpu Formation	China	A member of Medusozoa belonging to the family Olivooidae. The type species is S. petalon.	
Stephanophyllia plattenwaldensis	Sp. nov	Valid	Baron-Szabo	Early Cretaceous (late Aptian to Albian)	Garschella Formation	Austria	A stony coral belonging to the family Micrabaciidae.	
Sterictopathes	Gen. et sp. nov	Valid	Baliński & Sun	Ordovician (early Floian)	Fenxiang Formation; Honghuayuan Formation	China	A black coral related to Sinopathes reptans. The type species is S. radicatus.	
Voragoaxum	Gen. et sp. nov	Valid	Fedorowski	Carboniferous (Bashkirian)		Ukraine	A rugose coral belonging to the family Aulophyllidae. The type species is V. cavum.	
Zaphrentites etheringtonensis	Sp. nov	Valid	Bamber & Rodríguez in Bamber et al.	Carboniferous (Mississippian)		Canada	A rugose coral.	
Zaphrentites lerandi	Sp. nov	Valid	Bamber & Rodríguez in Bamber et al.	Carboniferous (Mississippian)		Canada	A rugose coral.	

== Bryozoans ==
=== Research ===
- Epizoic bryozoans are reported on fossil crabs from the Miocene Mishan Formation (Iran) by Key et al. (2017).

=== New taxa ===
Name	Novelty	Status	Authors	Age	Unit	Location	Notes	Images
Acupipora mexicana	Sp. nov	Valid	Ernst & Vachard	Carboniferous (middle Pennsylvanian)		Mexico		
Adeonellopsis sandbergi	Sp. nov	Valid	Di Martino, Taylor & Portell	Early Miocene	Chipola Formation	United States (Florida)	A cheilostome bryozoan belonging to the family Adeonidae.	
'Akatopora' wilmseni	Sp. nov	Valid	Martha, Niebuhr & Scholz	Late Cretaceous (mid-late Turonian)	Strehlen Formation	Germany	A cheilostome bryozoan.	
Atactotoechus vaulxensis	Sp. nov	Valid	Ernst et al.	Carboniferous (Mississippian)		Belgium	A bryozoan.	
Bashkirella arnaoense	Sp. nov	Valid	Suárez Andrés & Wyse Jackson	Devonian (Eifelian)	Moniello Formation	Spain	A member of Fenestrata belonging to the family Chasmatoporidae.	
Bigeyina cantabrica	Sp. nov	Valid	Suárez Andrés & Wyse Jackson	Devonian (Emsian–early Eifelian)	Moniello Formation	Spain	A member of Fenestrata belonging to the family Semicosciniidae.	
Bigeyina spinosa	Sp. nov	Valid	Suárez Andrés & Wyse Jackson	Devonian (Emsian–early Eifelian)	Moniello Formation	Spain	A member of Fenestrata belonging to the family Semicosciniidae.	
Bragella	Gen. et sp. nov	Valid	Di Martino et al.	Eocene–Oligocene transition		Tanzania	A cheilostome bryozoan. Genus includes new species B. pseudofedora.	
Buskia waiinuensis	Sp. nov	Valid	Di Martino et al.	Pleistocene	Nukumaru Limestone	New Zealand	A member of Ctenostomatida belonging to the superfamily Vesicularioidea and the family Buskiidae.	
Cheiloporina clarksvillensis	Sp. nov	Valid	Di Martino, Taylor & Portell	Early Miocene	Chipola Formation	United States (Florida)	A cheilostome bryozoan belonging to the family Cheiloporinidae.	
Cigclisula solenoides	Sp. nov	Valid	Di Martino, Taylor & Portell	Early Miocene	Chipola Formation	United States (Florida)	A cheilostome bryozoan belonging to the family Colatooeciidae.	
Coeloclemis zefrehensis	Sp. nov	Valid	Ernst et al.	Devonian (Frasnian)	Bahram Formation	Iran	A trepostome bryozoan.	
Diplosolen akatjevense	Sp. nov	Valid	Viskova & Pakhnevich	Middle Jurassic (Callovian)		Russia	A bryozoan belonging to the class Stenolaemata and the order Tubuliporida.	
Ditaxipora lakriensis	Sp. nov	Valid	Sonar & Pawar	Miocene (Burdigalian)	Chhasra Formation	India	A member of the family Catenicellidae.	
Eridopora moravica	Sp. nov	Valid	Tolokonnikova, Kalvoda & Kumpan	Carboniferous (Tournaisian)		Czech Republic		
Escharoides joannae	Sp. nov	Valid	Di Martino, Taylor & Portell	Early Miocene	Chipola Formation	United States (Florida)	A cheilostome bryozoan belonging to the family Romancheinidae.	
Euthyrhombopora tenuis	Sp. nov	Valid	Ernst et al.	Devonian (Frasnian)	Bahram Formation	Iran	A rhabdomesine cryptostome bryozoan.	
Exechonella minutiperforata	Sp. nov	Valid	Di Martino, Taylor & Portell	Early Miocene	Chipola Formation	United States (Florida)	A cheilostome bryozoan belonging to the family Exechonellidae.	
Exidmonea baghi	Sp. nov	Valid	Zágoršek, Yazdi & Bahrami	Miocene	Qom Formation	Iran	A cyclostome bryozoan.	
Fabifenestella almazani	Sp. nov	Valid	Ernst & Vachard	Carboniferous (middle Pennsylvanian)		Mexico		
Fenestrapora elegans	Sp. nov	Valid	Suárez Andrés & Wyse Jackson	Devonian (late Emsian–early Eifelian)	Moniello Formation	Spain	A member of Fenestrata belonging to the family Semicosciniidae.	
Filites robustus	Sp. nov	Valid	Suárez Andrés & Wyse Jackson	Devonian (Emsian–early Eifelian)	Moniello Formation	Spain	A member of Fenestrata belonging to the family Acanthocladiidae.	
Floridina subantiqua	Sp. nov	Valid	Di Martino, Taylor & Portell	Early Miocene	Chipola Formation	United States (Florida)	A cheilostome bryozoan belonging to the family Onychocellidae.	
Foratella cervisia	Sp. nov	Valid	Taylor & Martha	Late Cretaceous (Cenomanian)	Beer Head Limestone Formation	United Kingdom	A cheilostome bryozoan.	
Hagiosynodos simplex	Sp. nov	Valid	Di Martino, Taylor & Portell	Early Miocene	Chipola Formation	United States (Florida)	A cheilostome bryozoan belonging to the family Cheiloporinidae.	
Heteractis tanzaniensis	Sp. nov	Valid	Di Martino et al.	Eocene–Oligocene transition		Tanzania	A cheilostome bryozoan.	
Hillmeropora	Gen. et sp. nov	Valid	Martha, Niebuhr & Scholz	Late Cretaceous (mid-late Turonian)	Strehlen Formation	Germany	A cheilostome bryozoan genus belonging to the family Calloporidae. Type species H. pavonina; genus also includes Membranipora procurrens Brydone, 1929.	
Jablonskipora	Gen. et sp. nov	Valid	Martha & Taylor	Early Cretaceous (Albian)	Upper Greensand	United Kingdom	A cheilostome bryozoan. The type species is J. kidwellae.	
Kalvariella antiqua	Sp. nov	Valid	Suárez Andrés & Wyse Jackson	Devonian (Emsian–early Eifelian)	Moniello Formation	Spain	A member of Fenestrata belonging to the family Acanthocladiidae.	
Lacrimula crassa	Sp. nov	Valid	Di Martino et al.	Eocene–Oligocene transition		Tanzania	A cheilostome bryozoan.	
Lacrimula kilwaensis	Sp. nov	Valid	Di Martino et al.	Eocene–Oligocene transition		Tanzania	A cheilostome bryozoan.	
Margaretta pentaceratops	Sp. nov	Valid	Di Martino, Taylor & Portell	Early Miocene	Chipola Formation	United States (Florida)	A cheilostome bryozoan belonging to the family Margarettidae.	
Metrarabdotos aquaeguttum	Sp. nov	Valid	Ramalho, Távora & Zagorsek	Early Miocene	Pirabas Formation	Brazil	A member of Lepralielloidea belonging to the family Metrarabdotosidae.	
Metrarabdotos capanemensis	Sp. nov	Valid	Ramalho, Távora & Zagorsek	Early Miocene	Pirabas Formation	Brazil	A member of Lepralielloidea belonging to the family Metrarabdotosidae.	
Metrarabdotos elongatum	Sp. nov	Valid	Ramalho, Távora & Zagorsek	Early Miocene	Pirabas Formation	Brazil	A member of Lepralielloidea belonging to the family Metrarabdotosidae.	
Microeciella kolomnensis	Sp. nov	Valid	Viskova & Pakhnevich	Middle Jurassic (Callovian)		Russia	A bryozoan belonging to the suborder Tubuliporina and the family Oncousoeciidae.	
Microporella rusti	Sp. nov	Valid	Di Martino et al.	Pleistocene	Nukumaru Limestone	New Zealand	A member of the family Microporellidae.	
Nellia winstonae	Sp. nov	Valid	Di Martino, Taylor & Portell	Early Miocene	Chipola Formation	United States (Florida)	A cheilostome bryozoan belonging to the family Quadricellariidae.	
Nevianipora isfahani	Sp. nov	Valid	Zágoršek, Yazdi & Bahrami	Miocene	Qom Formation	Iran	A cyclostome bryozoan.	
'Onychocella' barbata	Sp. nov	Valid	Martha, Niebuhr & Scholz	Late Cretaceous (late Cenomanian)	Dölzschen Formation	Germany	A cheilostome bryozoan. Taylor, Martha & Gordon (2018) transferred this species to the genus Kamilocella.	
Onychocella saxoniae	Sp. nov	Valid	Martha, Niebuhr & Scholz	Late Cretaceous (late Cenomanian)	Dölzschen Formation	Germany	A cheilostome bryozoan.	
Paralicornia interdigitata	Sp. nov	Valid	Di Martino, Taylor & Portell	Early Miocene	Chipola Formation	United States (Florida)	A cheilostome bryozoan belonging to the family Candidae.	
Paraseptopora geometrica	Sp. nov	Valid	Suárez Andrés & Wyse Jackson	Devonian (late Emsian–early Eifelian)	Moniello Formation	Spain	A member of Fenestrata belonging to the family Septoporidae.	
Paraseptopora irregularis	Sp. nov	Valid	Suárez Andrés & Wyse Jackson	Devonian (Emsian–early Eifelian)	Moniello Formation	Spain	A member of Fenestrata belonging to the family Septoporidae.	
Pharopora	Gen. et sp. nov	Valid	Wyse Jackson, Ernst & Suárez Andrés	Carboniferous (Tournaisian)	Hook Head Formation	Ireland	A member of Cryptostomata belonging to the family Rhabdomesidae. The type species is P. regularis.	
Pleuromucrum epifanioi	Sp. nov	Valid	Di Martino, Taylor & Portell	Early Miocene	Chipola Formation	United States (Florida)	A cheilostome bryozoan belonging to the family Phidoloporidae.	
Pleuromucrum liowae	Sp. nov	Valid	Di Martino, Taylor & Portell	Early Miocene	Chipola Formation	United States (Florida)	A cheilostome bryozoan belonging to the family Phidoloporidae.	
Polyascosoecia iranica	Sp. nov	Valid	Zágoršek, Yazdi & Bahrami	Miocene	Qom Formation	Iran	A cyclostome bryozoan.	
Puellina quadrispinosa	Sp. nov	Valid	Di Martino, Taylor & Portell	Early Miocene	Chipola Formation	United States (Florida)	A cheilostome bryozoan belonging to the family Cribrilinidae.	
Revalotrypa inopinata	Sp. nov	Valid	Fedorov, Koromyslova & Martha	Ordovician (Floian)		Russia	An esthonioporate bryozoan belonging to the family Revalotrypidae.	
Revalotrypa yugaensis	Sp. nov	Valid	Fedorov, Koromyslova & Martha	Ordovician (Floian)		Russia	An esthonioporate bryozoan belonging to the family Revalotrypidae.	
Schizolepraliella	Gen. et sp. nov	Valid	Di Martino, Taylor & Portell	Early Miocene	Chipola Formation	United States (Florida)	A Schizoporella-like cheilostome bryozoan of uncertain phylogenetic placement. The type species is S. nancyae.	
Selenaria lyrulata	Sp. nov	Valid	López-Gappa, Pérez & Griffin	Early Miocene	Monte León Formation	Argentina	A bryozoan belonging to the family Selenariidae.	
Spiniflabellum jacksoni	Sp. nov	Valid	Di Martino, Taylor & Portell	Early Miocene	Chipola Formation	United States (Florida)	A cheilostome bryozoan belonging to the family Cribrilinidae.	
Steginoporella tiara	Sp. nov	Valid	Gordon, Voje & Taylor	Early Pleistocene		New Zealand	A member of Cheilostomata belonging to the family Steginoporellidae.	
Stylopoma farleyensis	Sp. nov	Valid	Di Martino, Taylor & Portell	Early Miocene	Chipola Formation	United States (Florida)	A cheilostome bryozoan belonging to the family Schizoporellidae.	
Stylopoma leverhulme	Sp. nov	Valid	Di Martino, Taylor & Portell	Early Miocene	Chipola Formation	United States (Florida)	A cheilostome bryozoan belonging to the family Schizoporellidae.	
Thalamoporella bitorquata	Sp. nov	Valid	Di Martino, Taylor & Portell	Early Miocene	Chipola Formation	United States (Florida)	A cheilostome bryozoan belonging to the family Thalamoporellidae.	
Thalamoporella hastigera	Sp. nov	Valid	Di Martino, Taylor & Portell	Early Miocene	Chipola Formation	United States (Florida)	A cheilostome bryozoan belonging to the family Thalamoporellidae.	
Thalamoporella ogivalis	Sp. nov	Valid	Di Martino, Taylor & Portell	Early Miocene	Chipola Formation	United States (Florida)	A cheilostome bryozoan belonging to the family Thalamoporellidae.	
Thalamoporella papalis	Sp. nov	Valid	Di Martino, Taylor & Portell	Early Miocene	Chipola Formation	United States (Florida)	A cheilostome bryozoan belonging to the family Thalamoporellidae.	
Thalamoporella polygonalis	Sp. nov	Valid	Di Martino, Taylor & Portell	Early Miocene	Chipola Formation	United States (Florida)	A cheilostome bryozoan belonging to the family Thalamoporellidae.	
Trypostega vokesi	Sp. nov	Valid	Di Martino, Taylor & Portell	Early Miocene	Chipola Formation	United States (Florida)	A cheilostome bryozoan belonging to the family Trypostegidae.	
Turbicellepora giardinai	Sp. nov	Valid	Di Martino, Taylor & Portell	Early Miocene	Chipola Formation	United States (Florida)	A cheilostome bryozoan belonging to the family Celleporidae.	
Utropora parva	Sp. nov	Valid	Suárez Andrés & Wyse Jackson	Devonian (Emsian–early Eifelian)	Moniello Formation	Spain	A member of Fenestrata belonging to the family Semicosciniidae.	
Vix scolaroi	Sp. nov	Valid	Di Martino, Taylor & Portell	Early Miocene	Chipola Formation	United States (Florida)	A cheilostome bryozoan belonging to the family Vicidae.	
Wilbertopora manubriformis	Sp. nov	Valid	Taylor & Martha	Late Cretaceous (Cenomanian)	Beer Head Limestone Formation	United Kingdom	A cheilostome bryozoan.	
Wilbertopora ostiolatoides	Sp. nov	Valid	Martha, Niebuhr & Scholz	Late Cretaceous (mid-late Turonian)	Strehlen Formation	Germany	A cheilostome bryozoan.	

== Brachiopods ==
=== Research ===
- A study on the selectivity of brachiopod extinctions during the Ordovician–Silurian extinction events is published by Finnegan, Rasmussen & Harper (2017).
- A study on the patterns of biomineralization of Late Permian brachiopod shells and on their implications for inferring the environmental disruptions associated with the Permian–Triassic extinction event is published by Garbelli, Angiolini & Shen (2017).

=== New taxa ===
Name	Novelty	Status	Authors	Age	Unit	Location	Notes	Images
Acrothyra bonnia	Sp. nov	Valid	Skovsted et al.	Cambrian Stage 4	Forteau Formation	Canada (Newfoundland and Labrador)	A member of Acrotretida belonging to the family Acrotretidae.	
Anarhynchia smithi	Sp. nov	Valid	Pálfy et al.	Early Jurassic (Pliensbachian)	Inklin Formation	Canada (British Columbia)		
Atelelasma longisulcum	Sp. nov	Valid	Liljeroth et al.	Ordovician	Dunabrattin Limestone Formation; Tramore Limestone Formation	Ireland	A member of Strophomenata belonging to the order Billingsellida and the family Clitambonitidae.	
Atychorhynchia	Gen. et sp. nov	Valid	Baeza-Carratalá, Reolid & García Joral	Early Jurassic (late Pliensbachian–early Toarcian)	Zegrí Formation	Spain	A member of Rhynchonellida belonging to the family Norellidae. The type species is A. falsiorigo.	
Avdeevella	Gen. et sp. nov	Valid	Baranov	Ordovician		Russia	The type species is A. mica.	
Bilobia alichovae	Sp. nov	Valid	Madison	Ordovician (Sandbian)		Russia (Leningrad Oblast)	A member of Strophomenida.	
Bittnerithyris	Gen. nov	Valid	Popov & Zakharov	Early Triassic (Olenekian)		Russia (Primorsky Krai)	A member of Terebratulida.	
Bronnothyris danaperensis	Sp. nov	Valid	Bitner & Müller	Eocene (Priabonian)		Ukraine	A member of Terebratulida belonging to the family Megathyrididae.	
Burrirhynchia albiensis	Sp. nov	Valid	Gaspard	Early Cretaceous (Albian)		France	A member of Rhynchonellida belonging to the family Tetrarhynchiidae.	
Colaptomena auduni	Sp. nov	Valid	Liljeroth et al.	Ordovician	Tramore Limestone Formation	Ireland	A member of Strophomenida belonging to the family Rafinesquinidae.	
Cyrtinaella? houi	Sp. nov	Valid	Lü & Ma	Devonian (late Frasnian)		China	A member of Spiriferinida.	
Cyrtospirifer ainosawensis	Sp. nov	Valid	Tazawa, Inose & Kaneko	Late Devonian	Ainosawa Formation	Japan	A member of Spiriferida belonging to the family Cyrtospiriferidae.	
Cyrtospirifer choanjiensis	Sp. nov	Valid	Tazawa	Late Devonian		Japan	A member of Spiriferida belonging to the family Cyrtospiriferidae.	
Dactylogonia costellata	Sp. nov	Valid	Liljeroth et al.	Ordovician	Dunabrattin Limestone Formation; Tramore Limestone Formation	Ireland	A member of Strophomenida belonging to the family Strophomenidae.	
Dirafinesquina antiqua	Sp. nov	Valid	Popov & Cocks	Ordovician (Dapingian)		Iran	A strophomenoid brachiopod.	
Discinisca suborbicularis	Sp. nov	Valid	Smirnova et al.	Late Jurassic		Russia		
Discinisca undata	Sp. nov	Valid	Smirnova in Smirnova et al.	Late Jurassic		Russia	A brachiopod belonging to the family Discinidae, a species of Discinisca.	
Elkanathyris	Gen. et sp. nov	Valid	Copper & Jin	Silurian (Aeronian)		Canada (Quebec)	An athyride brachiopod. The type species is E. pallula.	
Eoporambonites raziabadensis	Sp. nov	Valid	Popov & Cocks	Ordovician (Dapingian)		Iran	A porambonitoid brachiopod.	
Foveola ivari	Sp. nov	Valid	Holmer et al.	Ordovician (Sandbian)		Estonia	A member of Obolidae.	
Gypidula xui	Sp. nov	Valid	Lü & Ma	Devonian (late Frasnian)		China	A member of Pentamerida.	
Hesperorthis leinsterensis	Sp. nov	Valid	Liljeroth et al.	Ordovician	Dunabrattin Limestone Formation; Tramore Limestone Formation	Ireland	A member of Orthida belonging to the family Hesperorthidae.	
Hexigtenichonetes	Gen. et comb. nov	Valid	Shen in Shen et al.	Permian (Guadalupian)	Miaoling Formation	China	A member of Productida belonging to the family Rugosochonetidae. The type species is "Hemichonetes" hemipleura Li & Su in Li et al. (1980); genus also includes "Hemichonetes guangxingensis Li & Su in Li et al. (1980), "Hemichonetes subquadrata Li & Su in Li et al. (1980) and "Hemichonetes yanjiensis Li & Su in Li et al. (1980).	
Hibernobonites	Gen. et comb. nov	Valid	Liljeroth et al.	Ordovician	Dunabrattin Limestone Formation; Tramore Limestone Formation; Tourmakeady Limestone Formation?	Ireland	A member of Pentamerida belonging to the family Porambonitidae. The type species is "Atrypa" filosa M'Coy (1846); genus might also include "Porambonites" dubius Williams & Curry (1985).	
Howellites hibernicus	Sp. nov	Valid	Liljeroth et al.	Ordovician	Dunabrattin Limestone Formation; Tramore Limestone Formation	Ireland	A member of Orthida belonging to the family Dalmanellidae.	
Isophragma parallelum	Sp. nov	Valid	Liljeroth et al.	Ordovician	Dunabrattin Limestone Formation; Tramore Limestone Formation	Ireland	A member of Strophomenida belonging to the family Plectambonitidae.	
Joania ukrainica	Sp. nov	Valid	Bitner & Müller	Eocene (Priabonian)		Ukraine	A member of Terebratulida belonging to the family Megathyrididae.	
Karadagithyris boullierae	Sp. nov	Valid	Halamski & Cherif	Late Jurassic (Oxfordian)	Argiles de Saïda Formation	Algeria	A member of Terebratulida belonging to the family Muirwoodellidae.	
Karlsorus	Gen. et comb. nov	Valid	Jin & Holmer	Silurian (Wenlock)		Sweden	A new genus for "Pentamerus" gothlandicus Lebedev (1892).	
Koninckodonta sumuntanensis	Sp. nov	Valid	Baeza-Carratalá, Reolid & García Joral	Early Jurassic (late Pliensbachian–early Toarcian)	Zegrí Formation	Spain	A member of Athyridida belonging to the family Koninckinidae.	
Kurtothyris	Nom. nov	Valid	Shen in Shen et al.	Permian (late Cisuralian)	Chihsia Formation	China	A member of Spiriferida belonging to the family Skelidorygmidae; a replacement name for Litothyris Chang (1987). The type species is "Litothyris" anhuiensis Chang (1987).	
Kyrshabaktella diabola	Sp. nov	Valid	Skovsted et al.	Cambrian Stage 4	Forteau Formation	Canada (Newfoundland and Labrador)	A member of Linguloidea belonging to the family Kyrshabaktellidae.	
Lacunites ivantsovi	Sp. nov	Valid	Holmer et al.	Ordovician (early Darriwilian)		Russia	A paterinid brachiopod.	
Lamellaerhynchia carronensis	Sp. nov	Valid	Gaspard	Early Cretaceous (Albian)		France	A member of Rhynchonellida belonging to the family Cyclothyrididae.	
Leptagonia franca	Sp. nov	Valid	Mottequin & Simon	Carboniferous (Tournaisian)	Tournai Formation	Belgium	A member of Strophomenoidea belonging to the family Rafinesquinidae.	
Levipugnax? liui	Sp. nov	Valid	Lü & Ma	Devonian (late Frasnian)		China	A member of Rhynchonellida.	
Liaotarimella	Nom. nov	Valid	Shen in Shen et al.	Permian (Artinskian)	Wutankule Formation	China	A member of Productida belonging to the family Productellidae. A replacement name for Tarimella Chen (2004). The type species is "Tarimella" tarimensis Chen (2004).	
Lichuanorelloides	Gen. et sp. nov	Valid	Wang et al.	Early Triassic		China	Genus includes new species L. lichuanensis.	
Meristella? aksuensis	Sp. nov	Valid	Modzalevskaya et al.	Devonian (Lochkovian)		Tajikistan		
Nisusia guizhouensis	Sp. nov	Valid	Mao et al.	Cambrian	Kaili Formation; Qingxudong Formation	China	A brachiopod belonging to the subphylum Rhynchonelliformea, order Kutorginida and the family Nisusiidae.	
Nucleospira hannoniae	Nom. nov	Valid	Mottequin & Simon	Carboniferous (Tournaisian)	Tournai Formation	Belgium	A member of Athyridida belonging to the family Nucleospiridae; a replacement name for Athyris globulina de Koninck (1887).	
Onniella variabilis	Sp. nov	Valid	Harper, Parkes & Zhan	Ordovician (Katian)	Raheen Formation	Ireland	A dalmanelloid brachiopod belonging to the family Dalmanellidae.	
Ouraniorhynchus	Gen. et sp. nov	Valid	Modzalevskaya et al.	Devonian (Lochkovian)		Tajikistan	A brachiopod. Genus includes new species O. dronovi.	
Permocryptospirifer	Gen. et comb. nov	Valid	Shen & Grunt in Shen et al.	Permian (late Cisuralian and Guadalupian)	Chihsia Formation; Maokou Formation; Shazipo Formation	China	A member of Athyridida belonging to the family Athyrididae. The type species is "Cryptospirifer" omeishanensis Huang (1933); genus also includes "Cryptospirifer" minor Yang (1984) and "Cryptospirifer" shawanensis Jin et al. (1974).	
Piarorhynchella tazawai	Sp. nov	Valid	Popov & Zakharov	Early Triassic (Olenekian)		Russia (Primorsky Krai)	A member of Rhynchonellida.	
Platystrophia tramorensis	Sp. nov	Valid	Liljeroth et al.	Ordovician	Tramore Limestone Formation	Ireland	A member of Orthida belonging to the family Platystrophiidae.	
Pustulobolus	Gen. et sp. nov	Valid	Skovsted et al.	Cambrian Stage 3-4	Forteau Formation	Canada (Newfoundland and Labrador)	A member of Linguloidea belonging to the family Eoobolidae. The type species is P. triangulus.	
Qidongia	Gen. et sp. nov	Valid	Lü & Ma	Devonian (late Frasnian)		China	A member of Terebratulida. The type species is Q. tani.	
Rhipidomella discreta	Sp. nov	Valid	Cisterna et al.	Carboniferous (late Serpukhovian–Bashkirian)	El Paso Formation	Argentina	A brachiopod belonging to the group Orthida and the family Rhipidomellidae.	
Rioultina zalasensis	Sp. nov	Valid	Radwańska	Late Jurassic (Oxfordian)		Poland	A member of Thecideida belonging to the family Thecidellinidae.	
Sericoidea hibernica	Sp. nov	Valid	Harper, Parkes & Zhan	Ordovician (Katian)	Raheen Formation	Ireland	A plectambonitoid brachiopod belonging to the family Sowerbyellidae.	
Serratocrista scaldisensis	Sp. nov	Valid	Mottequin & Simon	Carboniferous (Tournaisian)	Tournai Formation	Belgium	A member of Orthotetida belonging to the family Schuchertellidae.	
Simehorthis	Gen. et sp. nov	Valid	Kebria-Ee Zadeh, Popov & Ghobadi Pour	Ordovician (Darriwilian)	Lashkarak Formation	Iran	A member of Orthida belonging to the family Hesperorthidae. Genus includes new species S. fascicostellata.	
Somalithyris lakhaparensis	Sp. nov	Valid	Mukherjee & Shome	Late Jurassic (Tithonian)		India		
Starnikoviella	Gen. et sp. nov	Valid	Baranov	Ordovician		Russia	The type species is S. settedabanica.	
Tectogonotoechia rivasi	Sp. nov	Valid	García-Alcalde & Herrera	Devonian (Pragian)	Nogueras Formation	Spain	A member of Rhynchonellida belonging to the superfamily Ancistrorhynchoidea and the family Iberirhynchiidae.	
Thomasaria? baii	Sp. nov	Valid	Lü & Ma	Devonian (late Frasnian)		China	A member of Spiriferida.	
Thomasaria? liangi	Sp. nov	Valid	Lü & Ma	Devonian (late Frasnian)		China	A member of Spiriferida.	
Tunethyris blodgetti	Sp. nov	Valid	Feldman	Middle Triassic	Saharonim Formation	Israel	A member of Terebratulida belonging to the family Dielasmatidae.	
Westonia mardini	Sp. nov	Valid	Mergl et al.	Cambrian (Furongian)	Sosink Formation	Turkey		
Xiangia	Gen. et sp. nov	Junior homonym	Lü & Ma	Devonian (late Frasnian)		China	A member of Spiriferida. The type species is X. liaoi. The generic name is preoccupied by Xiangia Peng (1987).	
Zhanorthis	Gen. et sp. nov	Valid	Popov & Cocks	Ordovician (Dapingian)		Iran	An orthoid brachiopod. Genus includes new species Z. gerdkuhensis.	
Ziyunospirifer	Nom. nov	Valid	Shen in Shen et al.	Early Carboniferous	Zhaojiashan Formation	China	A member of Spiriferida belonging to the family Choristitidae; a replacement name for Quizhouspirifer Xian (1982). The type species is "Quizhouspirifer" ziyunensis Xian (1982).	

== Echinoderms ==
=== Research ===
- Systematic revision of the North American members of the diploporitan family Holocystitidae is published by Sheffield & Sumrall (2017).
- Triassic members of the otherwise Paleozoic groups of sea urchins (the family Proterocidaridae), brittle stars (the family Eospondylidae) and starfish are reported by Thuy, Hagdorn & Gale (2017).
- Phylogenetic analysis and systematic revision of early to middle Paleozoic non-camerate crinoids published by Wright (2017).
- Systematic revision of Ordovician camerate crinoids published by Cole (2017).
- Major revision to the classification of fossil and extant Crinoidea by Wright et al. (2017), including the presentation of new phylogeny-based and rank-based classifications.
- A study on large-scale patterns of morphologic evolution in the Paleozoic radiation of eucladid crinoids is published by Wright (2017).
- A study on the internal morphology of the water vascular system in a specimen of a stem-ophiuroid species Protasterina flexuosa from the Ordovician (Katian) Kope Formation (Kentucky, United States) is published by Clark et al. (2017).
- A study on the paleoecology of the echinoderm species known from the upper Campanian Pierre Shale (including the crinoid Lakotacrinus brezinai), especially on their adaptations to the cold seep environment, is published by Kato, Oji & Shirai (2017).

=== New taxa ===
Name	Novelty	Status	Authors	Age	Unit	Location	Notes	Images
Amblypygus matruhensis	Sp. nov	Valid	Ali	Middle Miocene		Egypt	A sea urchin.	
Ambonacrinus	Gen. et sp. nov	Valid	Cole et al.	Ordovician (Katian)	Fombuena Formation	Spain	A diplobathrid camerate crinoid. Genus includes new species A. decorus.	
Andymetra toarcensis	Sp. nov	Valid	Hess & Thuy	Early Jurassic		France	A comatulid crinoid.	
Anthroosasterias	Gen. et sp. nov	Valid	Blake	Carboniferous	Gilmore City Formation	United States (Iowa)	A starfish belonging to the family Urasterellidae. Genus includes new species A. mikrotero.	
Antillaster farisi	Sp. nov	Valid	Ali	Middle Eocene		Egypt	A sea urchin.	
Aspidophiura? seren	Sp. nov	Valid	Ewin & Thuy	Jurassic	Oxford Clay Formation	United Kingdom	A brittle star.	
Ateleocystites? lansae	Sp. nov	Valid	McDermott & Paul	Ordovician (Katian)	Slade and Redhill Beds	United Kingdom	A mitrate belonging to the family Anomalocystitidae, possibly a species of Ateleocystites.	
Brissus mihalyi	Sp. nov.	Valid	Polonkai et al.	Middle Miocene	Leitha Limestone Formation	Hungary	A heart urchin belonging to the family Brissidae.	
Crepidosoma doylei	Sp. nov	Valid	Blake, Donovan & Harper	Silurian (Telychian)	Kilbride Formation	Ireland	A brittle star belonging to the group Oegophiurida and the family Encrinasteridae.	
Dalicrinus	Gen. et sp. nov	Valid	Cole et al.	Ordovician (Katian)	Fombuena Formation	Spain	A diplobathrid camerate crinoid. Genus includes new species D. hammanni.	
Diplodetus brisenoi	Sp. nov	Valid	Silva-Martínez et al.	Late Cretaceous (early Campanian)	Austin Formation	Mexico	A heart urchin belonging to the family Brissidae.	
Echinocyamus belali	Sp. nov	Valid	Ali	Middle Eocene		Egypt	A sea urchin.	
Enakomusium whymanae	Sp. nov	Valid	Ewin & Thuy	Jurassic	Oxford Clay Formation	United Kingdom	A brittle star.	
Eopatelliocrinus hispaniensis	Sp. nov	Valid	Cole et al.	Ordovician (Katian)	Fombuena Formation	Spain	A monobathrid camerate crinoid.	
Eotiaris guadalupensis	Sp. nov	Valid	Thompson in Thompson, Petsios & Bottjer	Permian (Capitanian)	Bell Canyon Formation	United States (Texas)	A sea urchin. The name first appeared in the publication of Thompson et al. (2015); however, it was published in an online only journal Scientific Reports and it was not registered with ZooBank, making it invalid until it was validated by Thompson, Petsios & Bottjer (2017).	
Felbabkacystis	Gen. et sp. nov	Valid	Nardin et al.	Cambrian (Drumian)	Jince Formation	Czech Republic	A transitional form between calyx-bearing and theca-bearing blastozoans. Genus includes new species F. luckae.	
Fombuenacrinus	Gen. et sp. nov	Valid	Cole et al.	Ordovician (Katian)	Fombuena Formation	Spain	A diplobathrid camerate crinoid. Genus includes new species F. nodulus.	
Forcipicrinus	Gen. et sp. nov	Valid	Hess & Thuy	Early Jurassic		France	An isocrinid crinoid. Genus includes new species F. normannicus.	
Globator roselli	Sp. nov	Valid	Carrasco	Eocene		Spain	A sea urchin related to members of the genus Conulus.	
Goniopygus emmae	Sp. nov	Valid	Forner i Valls	Late Cretaceous (Campanian)		Morocco	A sea urchin belonging to the group Arbacioida and the family Acropeltidae.	
Grigopyrgus	Gen. et comb. nov	Valid	Müller & Hahn	Early Devonian		Germany	A member of Edrioasteroidea belonging to the family Agelacrinitidae; a new genus for "Agelacrinites" curvatus Grigo (1995).	
Goyacrinus	Gen. et sp. nov	Valid	Cole et al.	Ordovician (Katian)	Fombuena Formation	Spain	A diplobathrid camerate crinoid. Genus includes new species G. gutierrezi.	
Heropyrgus	Gen. et sp. nov	Valid	Briggs et al.	Silurian	Herefordshire Lagerstätte	United Kingdom	A rhenopyrgid edrioasteroid. The type species is H. disterminus.	
Holocystites salmoensis	Sp. nov	Valid	Sheffield, Ausich & Sumrall	Ordovician (Hirnantian)	Ellis Bay Formation	Canada (Quebec)	A member of Diploporita belonging to the family Holocystitidae. Subsequently transferred to the genus Brightonicystis by Paul (2025).	
Metalia lindaae	Sp. nov	Valid	Ali	Middle Eocene		Egypt	A sea urchin.	
Monostychia alanrixi	Sp. nov	Valid	Sadler, Martin & Gallagher	Miocene	Colville Sandstone	Australia	A sea urchin.	
Monostychia macnamarai	Sp. nov	Valid	Sadler, Martin & Gallagher	Miocene	Colville Sandstone	Australia	A sea urchin.	
Monostychia robertirwini	Sp. nov	Valid	Sadler, Martin & Gallagher	Miocene	Colville Sandstone	Australia	A sea urchin.	
Moroccodiscus	Gen. et sp. nov	Valid	Reich et al.	Ordovician (Darriwilian)	Taddrist Formation	Morocco	A cyclocystoid echinoderm. Genus includes new species M. smithi.	
Oehlerticrinus peachi	Sp. nov	Valid	Donovan & Fearnhead	Early Devonian	Looe Basin	United Kingdom	A crinoid belonging to the group Monobathrida and the family Hexacrinitidae.	
Ophiotitanos smithi	Sp. nov	Valid	Ewin & Thuy	Jurassic	Oxford Clay Formation	United Kingdom	A brittle star.	
Ova rancoca	Sp. nov	Valid	Zachos	Paleocene (Thanetian)	Vincentown Formation	United States (New Jersey)	A sea urchin.	
Paerticrinus	Gen. et sp. nov	Valid	Wright & Toom	Silurian (Rhuddanian)		Estonia	A crinoid. Genus includes new species P. arvosus.	
Palaeocomaster structus	Sp. nov	Valid	Hess & Thuy	Early Jurassic		France	A comatulid crinoid.	
Persiacarpos	Gen. et sp. nov	Valid	Rozhnov & Parsley	Cambrian	Mila Formation	Iran	A member of Cornuta. Genus includes new species P. jefferiesi.	
Petalobrissus ossoi	Sp. nov	Valid	Forner i Valls	Late Cretaceous (Campanian)		Morocco	A sea urchin belonging to the group Cassiduloida and the family Faujasidae.	
Petalocrinus stenopetalus	Sp. nov	Valid	Mao et al.	Silurian (Aeronian)		China	A crinoid belonging to the family Petalocrinidae.	
Picassocrinus	Gen. et sp. nov	Valid	Cole et al.	Ordovician (Katian)	Fombuena Formation	Spain	A cladid crinoid. Genus includes new species P. villasi.	
Ronsocrinus	Gen. et sp. nov	Valid	Cordie & Witzke	Devonian (Givetian)		United States (Iowa)	A camerate crinoid belonging to the family Melocrinitidae. Genus includes new species R. rabia.	
Salenia palmyra	Sp. nov	Valid	Zachos	Paleocene (Danian)	Clayton Formation	United States (Alabama; Georgia (U.S. state))	A sea urchin.	
Sanducystis	Gen. et sp. nov	Valid	Zamora et al.	Cambrian (Furongian)	Sandu Formation	China	A stemmed echinoderm. The type species is S. sinensis.	
Singillatimetra truncata	Sp. nov	Valid	Hess & Thuy	Early Jurassic		France	An isocrinid crinoid.	
Solanocrinites jagti	Sp. nov	Valid	Hess & Thuy	Early Jurassic		France	A comatulid crinoid.	
Spinimetra	Gen. et sp. nov	Valid	Hess & Thuy	Early Jurassic		France	A comatulid crinoid. Genus includes new species S. chesnieri.	
Spirocrinus circularis	Sp. nov	Valid	Mao et al.	Silurian (Aeronian)		China	A crinoid belonging to the family Petalocrinidae.	
Spirocrinus dextrosus	Sp. nov	Valid	Mao et al.	Silurian (Aeronian)		China	A crinoid belonging to the family Petalocrinidae.	
Staurasterias	Gen. et sp. nov	Valid	Blake	Carboniferous	Keokuk Formation	United States (Indiana)	A starfish belonging to the family Urasterellidae. Genus includes new species S. elegans.	
Sumrallia	Gen. et sp. nov	Valid	Müller & Hahn	Early Devonian	Seifen Formation	Germany	A member of Edrioasteroidea. Genus includes new species S. rseiberti.	
Superstesaster	Gen. et sp. nov	Valid	Villier et al.	Early Triassic		United States (Utah)	A starfish. Genus includes new species S. promissor.	
Teleosaster	Gen. et sp. nov	Valid	Hunter & McNamara	Permian (Kungurian)	Cundlego Formation	Australia	A brittle star. Genus includes new species T. creasyi.	
Tintinnabulicrinus	Gen. et sp. nov	Valid	Wright & Toom	Ordovician (Katian)		Estonia	A crinoid. Genus includes new species T. estoniensis.	
Ulphaceaster	Gen. et sp. nov	Valid	Néraudeau et al.	Late Cretaceous (Cenomanian)		France	A sea urchin belonging to the family Archiaciidae. Genus includes new species U. sarthacensis.	
Vologesia rollingstones	Sp. nov	Valid	Schlüter & Wiese	Late Cretaceous (early Campanian)		Spain	A sea urchin belonging to the family Echinolampadidae.	

== Conodonts ==
=== Research ===
- A study on the conodont assemblage from the Silurian (Homerian) Rootsiküla Formation (Estonia), interpreted as occurring in the evaporite-bearing strata, and on the conodont diversity in various environments, is published by Jarochowska et al. (2017).
- Articulated skeletal remains of Hindeodus parvus, providing direct evidence of the number and arrangement of elements in the apparatus, are described from the Lower Triassic of China by Zhang et al. (2017).

=== New taxa ===
Name	Novelty	Status	Authors	Age	Unit	Location	Notes	Images
Acodus zeballus	Sp. nov	Valid	Voldman & Albanesi in Voldman et al.	Early Ordovician		Argentina		
Aldridgeognathus	Gen. et sp. nov	Valid	Miller et al.	Ordovician (Darriwilian)	Amdeh Formation	Oman	A member of Balognathidae. Genus includes new species A. manniki.	
Bispathodus ultimus corradinii	Subsp. nov	Valid	Söte, Hartenfels & Becker	Devonian (Famennian)		Germany		
Coelocerodontus hunanensis	Sp. nov	Valid	Dong & Zhang	Cambrian (Furongian)	Panjiazui Formation	China	A euconodont.	
Ctenopolygnathus parallelus	Sp. nov	Valid	Ovnatanova et al.	Late Devonian	Kedzyrschor Formation	Russia		
Fahraeusodus jachalensis	Sp. nov	Valid	Feltes & Albanesi in Serra et al.	Ordovician (Darriwilian)	Gualcamayo Formation; Las Aguaditas Formation; Las Chacritas Formation; San Juan Formation	Argentina		
Furnishina wangcunensis	Sp. nov	Valid	Dong & Zhang	Cambrian (Furongian)	Bitiao Formation	China	A member of Paraconodontida.	
Gothodus vetus	Sp. nov	Valid	Voldman & Albanesi in Voldman et al.	Early Ordovician		Argentina		
Guexispathodus	Gen. et comb. nov	Valid	Plasencia et al.	Middle Triassic	Mukheiris Formation; Saharonim Formation	Israel; Jordan	A member of the family Gondolellidae. The type species is "Neospathodus" shagami Benjamini & Chepstow-Lusty (1986); genus also includes "Pseudofurnishius" siyalaensis Sadeddin & Kozur (1992).	
Gullodus tieqiaoensis	Sp. nov	Valid	Sun et al.	Permian		China		
Icriodus ballbergensis	Sp. nov	Valid	Lüddecke, Hartenfels & Becker	Devonian (Famennian)		Germany		
Icriodus marieae	Sp. nov	Valid	Suttner, Kido & Suttner	Middle Devonian	Valentin Formation	Austria; France; Germany		
Idiognathodus boardmani	Sp. nov	Valid	Hogancamp & Barrick	Carboniferous (Gzhelian)	Heebner Shale	United States		
Idiognathodus itaitubensis	Sp. nov	Valid	Cardoso, Sanz-López & Blanco-Ferrera	Carboniferous (Pennsylvanian)	Tapajós Group	Brazil		
Idiognathoides luokunensis	Sp. nov	Valid	Hu & Qi in Hu et al.	Carboniferous (Bashkirian)		China		
Iowagnathus	Gen. et sp. nov	Valid	Liu et al.	Ordovician (Whiterock Stage)	Winneshiek Konservat-Lagerstätte	United States (Iowa)	Genus includes new species I. grandis.	
Kirilella	Gen. et comb. nov	Valid	Plasencia et al.	Middle Triassic		Austria; Canada; China; Egypt; Hungary; Israel; Italy; Japan; Jordan; Russia; Spain; United States	A member of the family Gondolellidae. The type species is "Polygnathus" mungoensis Diebel (1956); genus also includes "Tardogondolella" diebeli Kozur & Mostler (1971), "Epigondolella" mostleri Kozur in Kozur & Mock (1972) and "Metapolygnathus" longobardicus Kovács (1983).	
Laiwugnathus hunanensis	Sp. nov	Valid	Dong & Zhang	Cambrian (Drumian)	Huaqiao Formation	China	A member of Paraconodontida.	
Laiwugnathus transitans	Sp. nov	Valid	Dong & Zhang	Cambrian (Guzhangian and Paibian)	Chefu Formation	China	A member of Paraconodontida.	
Lenathodus	Gen. et sp. nov	Valid	Izokh in Izokh & Yazikov	Early Carboniferous		Russia	Genus includes new species L. bakharevi.	
Lugnathus	Gen. et sp. nov	Valid	Dong & Zhang	Cambrian Stage 10 and Early Ordovician (Tremadocian)	Panjiazui Formation	China	A member of Paraconodontida. Genus includes new species L. hunanensis.	
Marquezella	Gen. et comb. nov	Valid	Plasencia et al.	Middle Triassic		Austria; Bulgaria; China; France; Greece; Hungary; India; Italy; Japan; Russia; Slovakia; Slovenia; Spain	A member of the family Gondolellidae. The type species is "Gladigondolella" truempyi Hirsch (1971); genus also includes "Polygnathus" japonicus Hayashi (1968).	
Mayrodus	Gen. et sp. nov	Valid	Zhang, Jowett & Barnes	Silurian (Sheinwoodian)	Cape Phillips Formation	Canada (Nunavut)	A conodont of uncertain phylogenetic placement. The type species is M. melchini.	
Miaognathus	Gen. et sp. nov	Valid	Dong & Zhang	Cambrian Stage 10	Shenjiawan Formation	China	A member of Paraconodontida. Genus includes new species M. multicostatus.	
Millerodontus	Gen. et sp. nov	Valid	Dong & Zhang	Cambrian (Furongian)	Shenjiawan Formation	China	A euconodont. Genus includes new species M. intermedius.	
Mosherella praebudaensis	Sp. nov	Valid	Chen & Lukeneder	Late Triassic (Carnian)	Kasimlar Formation	Turkey		
Neopolygnathus communis yazikovi	Subsp. nov	Valid	Izokh in Izokh & Yazikov	Early Carboniferous		Russia		
Neopolygnathus crucesignatis	Sp. nov	Valid	Plotitsyn & Zhuravlev	Carboniferous (Tournaisian)		Russia		
Norigondolella carlae	Sp. nov	In press	Rigo et al.	Late Triassic (Carnian)	Scillato Formation	Austria; Italy; Turkey	A member of Ozarkodinida.	
Omanognathus	Gen. et sp. nov	Valid	Miller et al.	Ordovician (Darriwilian)	Amdeh Formation	Oman	A member of Balognathidae. Genus includes new species O. daiqaensis.	
Palmatolepis chernovi	Sp. nov	Valid	Soboleva	Devonian (Frasnian)		Russia		
Palmatolepis spallettae	Nom. nov	Valid	Klapper et al.	Devonian (Frasnian)		Canada (Ontario)	A replacement name for Palmatolepis nodosa Klapper et al. (2004).	
Palmatolepis zhuravlevi	Sp. nov	Valid	Soboleva	Devonian (Frasnian)		Russia		
Polygnathus arcus	Sp. nov	Valid	Plotitsyn & Zhuravlev	Carboniferous (Tournaisian)		Russia		
Polygnathus mawsonae	Sp. nov	Junior homonym	Ovnatanova et al.	Devonian (Famennian)	Sortomael' Formation	Australia; Russia	Ovnatanova et al. (2019) coined a replacement name Polygnathus sharyuensis.	
Polygnathus postvogesi	Sp. nov	Valid	Plotitsyn & Zhuravlev	Carboniferous (Tournaisian)		Russia		
Prosagittodontus compressus	Sp. nov	Valid	Dong & Zhang	Cambrian (Guzhangian and Paibian)	Chefu Formation	China	A member of Paraconodontida.	
Pseudohindeodus elliptica	Sp. nov	Valid	Sun et al.	Permian		China		
Quadralella wanlanensis	Sp. nov	Valid	Zhang et al.	Triassic		China		
Quadralella yongyueensis	Sp. nov	Valid	Zhang et al.	Triassic		China		
Siphonodella carinata	Sp. nov	Valid	Zhuravlev	Carboniferous (Tournaisian)	Idzhid Formation	Russia (Komi Republic)		
Siphonodella kalvodai	Sp. nov	Valid	Kaiser, Kumpan & Cígler	Carboniferous (Tournaisian)	Líšeň Formation	Czech Republic; Tajikistan	A member of Ozarkodinida belonging to the family Elictognathidae.	
Sweetognathus asymmetrica	Sp. nov	Valid	Sun et al.	Permian		China		
Tujiagnathus	Gen. et sp. nov	Valid	Dong & Zhang	Cambrian (Furongian)	Bitiao Formation	China	A euconodont. Genus includes new species T. gracilis.	
Vjalovognathus carinatus	Sp. nov	Valid	Wang et al.	Permian (Changhsingian)		China; India		
Wangcunella	Gen. et sp. nov	Valid	Dong & Zhang	Cambrian (Furongian)	Bitiao Formation	China	A euconodont. Genus includes new species W. conicus.	
Wangcunognathus	Gen. et sp. nov	Valid	Dong & Zhang	Cambrian (Paibian)	Bitiao Formation	China	A member of Paraconodontida. Genus includes new species W. elegans.	
Westergaardodina dimorpha	Sp. nov	Valid	Dong & Zhang	Cambrian (Paibian)	Bitiao Formation	China	A member of Paraconodontida.	
Westergaardodina gigantea	Sp. nov	Valid	Dong & Zhang	Cambrian (Guzhangian)	Chefu Formation	China	A member of Paraconodontida.	
Westergaardodina sola	Sp. nov	Valid	Dong & Zhang	Cambrian (Guzhangian)	Chefu Formation	China	A member of Paraconodontida.	
Zentagnathus	Gen. et comb. nov	Valid	Voldman & Albanesi in Voldman et al.	Early Ordovician		Argentina	A new genus for "Trapezognathus" primitivus Voldman, Albanesi & Zeballo in Voldman et al. (2013); genus also includes "Trapezognathus" argentinensis Rao et al. (1994)	

== Amphibians ==
=== Research ===
- A study on the evolution of eye size in early tetrapods and in fish belonging to the lineage that gave rise to tetrapods, as well as on the impact of the eye size on the eye performance while viewing objects through water and through air is published by MacIver et al. (2017).
- A study on the evolution of forelimb musculature from the lobe-finned fish to early tetrapods is published online by Molnar et al. (2017).
- A study on the influence of habitat traits on the persistence length of living and fossil amphibian species is published by Tietje & Rödel (2017).
- A study on the development of the vertebral intercentrum and pleurocentrum in fossil amphibians is published by Danto et al. (2017).
- A study on the probable function of the interpterygoid vacuities (holes in the palate) in temnospondyls as the site of muscle attachment is published by Witzmann & Werneburg (2017).
- A study on the earliest larval development in temnospondyls, as indicated by specimens from the Permian (Sakmarian) lake sediments near Obermoschel (Saar–Nahe Basin, Germany), is published by Werneburg (2017).
- A study on the histology of the small palatal plates and their denticles in a Permian dissorophoid temnospondyl from the Dolese Brothers Limestone Quarry near Richards Spur (Oklahoma, United States) is published by Gee, Haridy & Reisz (2017).
- Taxonomic revision of all described rhinesuchids and a study on the phylogenetic relationships of members of Rhinesuchidae is published by Marsicano et al. (2017), who transfer the species "Rhinesuchus" capensis Haughton (1925) to the genus Rhinesuchoides.
- New specimen of the rhinesuchid Australerpeton cosgriffi (a skull and mandible) is described from the Permian Rio do Rasto Formation (Brazil) by Azevedo, Vega & Soares (2017).
- A description of the anatomy of the braincase and middle ear regions of an exceptionally well-preserved skull of Stanocephalosaurus amenasensis from the Triassic of Algeria is published by Arbez, Dahoumane & Steyer (2017).
- A study on the anatomy of the skulls of metoposaurid species Metoposaurus krasiejowensis and Apachesaurus gregorii, as well as its implications for establishing whether metoposaurids were active or ambush predators is published by Fortuny, Marcé-Nogué & Konietzko-Meier (2017).
- An analysis of the microanatomy and histology of metoposaurid vertebra from the Petrified Forest National Park is published by Gee, Parker & Marsh (2017), who interpret Apachesaurus gregorii as more likely to be an early ontogenetic stage of a large metoposaurid, such as Koskinonodon perfectus rather than a distinct species.
- A juvenile specimen of Koskinonodon perfectus is described from the Norian Petrified Forest Member of the Late Triassic Chinle Formation (Arizona, United States) by Gee & Parker (2017).
- A study on the physiology (especially metabolic rate, body temperature, breathing, feeding, digestion, osmoregulation and excretion) of Archegosaurus decheni is published by Witzmann & Brainerd (2017).
- A study on the histology of the dermal skull roof bones in Kokartus honorarius is published by Skutschas & Boitsova (2017).
- Fossilized soft tissues preserved with the type specimen of the salamander Phosphotriton sigei are described by Tissier, Rage & Laurin (2017).
- A study on the bite force in extant Cranwell's horned frog (Ceratophrys cranwelli) and its implications for estimating the bite force in the Late Cretaceous species Beelzebufo ampinga is published by Lappin et al. (2017).
- Frog fossils, including the first known fossils of shovelnose frogs, are described from the early Pliocene of Kanapoi (Kenya) by Delfino (2017).
- A study on the morphology of the skull of Lethiscus stocki and on the phylogenetic relationships of early tetrapods, recovering lepospondyls as a polyphyletic group, is published by Pardo et al. (2017).

=== New taxa ===
==== Temnospondyls ====
Name	Novelty	Status	Authors	Age	Unit	Location	Notes	Images
Aphaneramma gavialimimus	Sp. nov	Valid	Fortuny et al.	Early Triassic (Olenekian)		Madagascar		Aphaneramma
Chinlestegophis	Gen. et sp. nov	Valid	Pardo, Small & Huttenlocker	Late Triassic	Chinle Formation	United States (Colorado)	A member of Stereospondyli, possibly a stem-caecilian. The type species is C. jenkinsi.	
Cyclotosaurus naraserluki	Sp. nov	Valid	Marzola et al.	Late Triassic	Fleming Fjord Formation	Greenland		Cyclotosaurus
Tomeia	Gen. et sp. nov	Valid	Eltink, Stock Da-Rosa, & Dias-da-Silva	Early Triassic	Sanga do Cabral Formation	Brazil	A capitosaur.	

==== Lissamphibians ====
Name	Novelty	Status	Authors	Age	Unit	Location	Notes	Images
Chachaiphrynus	Gen. et sp. nov	Valid	Nicoli	Oligocene		Argentina	A member of Odontophrynidae. The type species is C. lynchi.	
Genibatrachus	Gen. et sp. nov	Valid	Gao & Chen	Early Cretaceous	Guanghua (upper part of Longjiang) Formation	China	A crown-group frog. The type species is G. baoshanensis.	
Sanshuibatrachus	Gen. et sp. nov	Valid	Wang, Roček & Dong	Early Eocene		China	A pelobatoid frog of uncertain phylogenetic placement. Genus includes new species S. sinensis.	

==== Other amphibians ====
Name	Novelty	Status	Authors	Age	Unit	Location	Notes	Images
Spathicephalus marsdeni	Sp. nov	Valid	Smithson et al.	Carboniferous (Viséan)	Anstruther Formation	United Kingdom	A member of the superfamily Baphetoidea.	
Yumenerpeton	Gen. et sp. nov	Valid	Jiang, Ji & Mo	Middle Permian	Xidagou Formation	China	A bystrowianid chroniosuchian. The type species is Y. yangi.	

== Synapsids ==
=== Non-mammalian synapsids ===
==== Research ====
- Phreatophasma aenigmaticum is argued to be a member of Caseidae by Brocklehurst & Fröbisch (2017).
- New fossil material of the caseid Alierasaurus ronchii is described from the Permian deposits of Cala del Vino Formation (Sardinia, Italy) by Romano et al. (2017).
- A study on the histology of the humeri of Ophiacodon, revealing the existence of fibrolamellar bone in the postcranial bones of this taxon, is published by Shelton & Sander (2017).
- A study on the body size evolution of edaphosaurids and sphenacodontids is published by Brocklehurst & Brink (2017).
- A study on the evolution of the endothermy in non-mammalian therapsids as indicated by oxygen isotope composition of bone and tooth phosphate in Permian and Triassic therapsids is published by Rey et al. (2017).
- A study on the brain morphology of non-mammaliaform therapsids based on skull endocasts of Moschops capensis and a number of biarmosuchians (including Herpetoskylax hopsoni and members of the genera Hipposaurus and Lemurosaurus) is published by Benoit et al. (2017).
- A study on the morphology of the bony labyrinth of five biarmosuchian specimens is published by Benoit et al. (2017).
- A study on the anatomy of the skull of Moschops capensis, revealing adaptations of the central nervous system related to head-to-head fighting, is published by Benoit et al. (2017).
- A study on the resting metabolic rate in Moghreberia nmachouensis is published by Olivier et al. (2017).
- A study on the contents of the depression known as the "unossified zone" in the brain cavity of Diictodon feliceps is published by Laaß, Schillinger & Kaestner (2017).
- A reassessment of the skull morphology and phylogenetic position of Compsodon helmoedi is published by Angielczyk & Kammerer (2017).
- A skeleton of Lystrosaurus curvatus in a fossilized burrow, preserved with taphonomic evidence indicating that this individual was the burrow maker, is described from the Lower Triassic of the South African Karoo Basin by Botha-Brink (2017).
- A structure analogous to the mammalian neocortex is reported in Kawingasaurus fossilis by Laaß & Kaestner (2017).
- A gorgonopsian dentary affected by a condition closely resembling compound odontoma is reported from the Upper Permian of Tanzania by Whitney, Mose & Sidor (2017).
- A detailed description of the braincase of two gorgonopsian specimens (a probable specimen of Aelurosaurus wilmanae from South Africa and a possible specimen of Arctognathus? nasuta from Tanzania) is published by Araújo et al. (2017).
- A redescription and revision of the gorgonopsian genus Arctops is published by Kammerer (2017).
- Rediscovered holotype of the gorgonopsian species Clelandina major is described by Kammerer (2017), who considers this species to be a junior synonym of Clelandina rubidgei.
- A study on the anatomy of the teeth and maxilla of Euchambersia mirabilis and its implications for the hypothesis that venom gland were present in this species is published by Benoit et al. (2017).
- A redescription and a study on the phylogenetic relationships of Silphoictidoides ruhuhuensis is published by Maisch (2017), who considers the species to be a basal member of Baurioidea.
- A study on the internal morphology of the interorbital region of the skull of basal cynodonts, including rarely fossilized orbitosphenoid elements, is published by Benoit et al. (2017).
- A study on the anatomy of the nasal regions of the non-mammalian cynodonts Massetognathus, Probainognathus and Elliotherium, comparing it to the nasal regions of fossil mammaliaforms and extant mammals, is published by Crompton et al. (2017).
- A survey of the aggregations of the specimens of Galesaurus planiceps and Thrinaxodon liorhinus, with emphasis on whether the aggregations consist of individuals of similar age or representing a mixture of different age classes, is published by Jasinoski & Abdala (2017).
- A study on the ontogenetic changes in the skull and mandible of Galesaurus planiceps is published by Jasinoski & Abdala (2017).
- A description of the postcranial skeleton of Boreogomphodon from the Triassic Pekin Formation (North Carolina, United States) and a review of the postcranial variation across members of the family Traversodontidae is published by Liu, Schneider & Olsen (2017).
- A study on the jaw movement of Exaeretodon argentinus as indicated by its dental microwear is published by Kubo, Yamada & Kubo (2017).
- A study on the morphology of the teeth of the cynodont Candelariodon barberenai, as well as on the phylogenetic relationships of the species, is published by Martinelli et al. (2017).
- A description of the anatomy of the postcranial skeleton of Tritylodon longaevus is published by Gaetano, Abdala & Govender (2017).
- A reassessment of the anatomy of the postcanine teeth of Stereognathus, based upon all available material from the United Kingdom, is published by Panciroli et al. (2017), who consider the species S. hebridicus to be a junior synonym of the species S. ooliticus.
- Cast of a burrow which was probably made by a tritheledontid cynodont is described from the Early Jurassic upper Elliot Formation (South Africa) by Bordy et al. (2017).
- A study on the evolution of jaw muscles across the cynodont–mammaliaform transition is published by Lautenschlager et al. (2017).

==== New taxa ====
Name	Novelty	Status	Authors	Age	Unit	Location	Notes	Images
Alemoatherium	Gen. et sp. nov	Valid	Martinelli et al.	Late Triassic (late Carnian)	Santa Maria Formation	Brazil	A cynodont belonging to the group Prozostrodontia. The type species is A. huebneri.	
Aleodon cromptoni	Sp. nov	Valid	Martinelli et al.	Triassic (Ladinian—early Carnian)		Brazil; Namibia?	A cynodont belonging to the family Chiniquodontidae.	
Bulbasaurus	Gen. et sp. nov	Valid	Kammerer & Smith	Late Permian	Teekloof Formation	South Africa	A dicynodont belonging to the family Geikiidae. The type species is B. phylloxyron.	
Dalongkoua	Gen. et sp. nov	Valid	Liu & Abdala	Late Permian	Guodikeng Formation	China	A therocephalian. The type species is D. fuae.	
Microwhaitsia	Gen. et sp. nov	Valid	Huttenlocker & Smith	Permian (Wuchiapingian)	Teekloof Formation	South Africa	A whaitsiid therocephalian. The type species is M. mendrezi.	
Nuurtherium	Gen. et sp. nov	Valid	Velazco, Buczek & Novacek	Late Jurassic	Ulan Malgait Sequence	Mongolia	A tritylodontid cynodont. The type species is N. baruunensis.	
Ophidostoma	Gen. et sp. nov	Valid	Huttenlocker & Smith	Permian (Wuchiapingian)	Teekloof Formation	South Africa	A whaitsioid therocephalian of uncertain phylogenetic placement. The type species is O. tatarinovi.	
Parasuminia	Gen. et sp. nov	Valid	Kurkin	Permian (Severodvinian)	Poldarsa Formation	Russia	An anomodont related to Suminia. Genus includes new species P. ivakhnenkoi.	
Scalenodon ribeiroae	Sp. nov	Valid	Melo, Martinelli & Soares	Triassic	Santa Maria Supersequence	Brazil	A traversodontid cynodont.	
Shartegodon	Gen. et sp. nov	Valid	Velazco, Buczek & Novacek	Late Jurassic	Ulan Malgait Sequence	Mongolia	A tritylodontid cynodont. The type species is S. altai.	
Shiguaignathus	Gen. et sp. nov	Valid	Liu & Abdala	Late Permian	Naobaogou Formation	China	An akidnognathid therocephalian. The type species is S. wangi.	

== Other animals ==
=== Research ===
- A study on a succession of Ediacaran to Cambrian fossil assemblages from the eastern Siberian Platform (Russia) is published by Zhu et al. (2017), who argue that so-called Ediacaran and earliest Cambrian skeletal biotas overlap without notable biotic turnover.
- A study on the Ediacaran taxon Parvancorina minchami, indicating that this animal was capable of performing rheotaxis, is published by Paterson et al. (2017).
- A study on the water flow around the body of the Ediacaran taxon Parvancorina and its implications for the feeding mode and mobility of this animal is published by Darroch et al. (2017).
- Fossils of members of the genus Namacalathus (co-occurring with Cloudina and Corumbella) are reported from the Ediacaran Tagatiya Guazú Formation (Itapucumi Group, Paraguay) by Warren et al. (2017), extending known geographic range of the taxon.
- A study on the morphology, growth and development of Dickinsonia costata is published by Evans, Droser & Gehling (2017).
- A study on the growth and development of Dickinsonia is published by Hoekzema et al. (2017), who interpret this taxon as an animal.
- A study on the anatomy of Dickinsonia costata and D. tenuis is published by Zakrevskaya & Ivantsov (2017), who interpret D. costata as probably descended from D. tenuis by neoteny.
- Description of newly discovered disc-shaped, soft-bodied fossils from the early Cambrian Carrara Formation (California, United States), tentatively assigned to the genus Discophyllum (an animal of uncertain phylogenetic placement, might be a chondrophore or an eldoniid) is published by Lieberman et al. (2017).
- Specimens of Cloudina associated with microbial mat textures are reported from the Ediacaran Tamengo Formation (Brazil) by Becker-Kerber et al. (2017).
- An assemblage of trace fossils from Ediacaran–Cambrian siltstones in Brazil, probably produced by a nematoid-like organism, is described by Parry et al. (2017).
- A diverse fauna dominated by sponges living immediately after the Hirnantian extinction is described from China by Botting et al. (2017).
- A diverse Early Triassic (Olenekian) marine assemblage (Paris biota), including leptomitid protomonaxonid sponges (a group otherwise known only from Cambrian and Ordovician), new forms of the crinoid order Holocrinida displaying advanced characters, a probable basal ophiodermatid and gladius-bearing coleoids (previously unknown in Early Triassic strata) is reported from Paris (Idaho, United States) by Brayard et al. (2017).
- A study on the muscle anatomy of Pambdelurion whittingtoni is published by Young & Vinther (2017).
- Cambrian species Zhenghecaris shankouensis, originally classified as a bivalved arthropod, is reinterpreted as a member of Radiodonta by Zeng et al. (2017).
- The holotype specimen of a putative lobopodian species Aysheaia prolata is reinterpreted as an isolated frontal appendage of a radiodontan belonging to the genus Stanleycaris by Pates, Daley & Ortega-Hernández (2017).
- A revision of the radiodontan genus Caryosyntrips is published by Pates & Daley (2017), who interpret the holotype specimen of a putative lobopodian species Mureropodia apae as a partial isolated appendage of a member of the genus Caryosyntrips.
- Description of the morphology of Amplectobelua symbrachiata, with a focus on its head region, is published by Cong et al. (2017).
- A study on the anatomy of the Cambrian hyolith Haplophrentis, as well as on the phylogenetic relationships of the hyoliths, is published by Moysiuk, Smith & Caron (2017).
- A study on the phylogenetic relationships of Tullimonstrum gregarium, challenging its interpretation as a vertebrate, is published by Sallan et al. (2017).
- New exceptionally preserved fossils of Vetulicola longbaoshanensis are described from the Lower Cambrian Wulongqing Formation (China) by Li, Liu & Ou (2017).
- Putative trematode metacercariae preserved at the base of the femora of an agamid lizard are described from the Cretaceous Burmese amber (Myanmar) by Poinar et al. (2017).

=== New taxa ===
Name	Novelty	Status	Authors	Age	Unit	Location	Notes	Images
Acoelia discontinua	Sp. nov	Valid	Wu	Permian (Changhsingian)		China	A calcareous sponge belonging to the order Inozoa and the family Acoeliidae.	
Aeroretiolites	Gen. et sp. nov	Valid	Melchin, Lenz & Kozłowska	Silurian		Canada	A graptolite. Genus includes new species A. cancellatus.	
Aladraco	Nom. et sp. nov	Valid	Geyer	Cambrian	Jbel Wawrmast Formation; Tannenknock Formation	Germany; Morocco	A member of Hyolitha; a replacement name for Oxyprymna Kiderlen (1933). Genus includes A. schloppensis (Wurm, 1925) and a new species A. ougnatensis.	
Allonnia erjiensis	Sp. nov	Valid	Yun, Zhang & Li	Cambrian	Chengjiang Lagerstätte	China	A chancelloriid.	
Andiprion	Gen. et sp. nov	Valid	Hints et al.	Ordovician (Dapingian)		Argentina	A polychaete described on the basis of scolecodonts. Genus includes new species A. paxtonae.	
Angulosuspongia	Gen. et sp. nov	Valid	Yang et al.	Cambrian Stage 5	Kaili Formation	China	A sponge belonging to the order Verongida and the family Vauxiidae. Genus includes new species A. sinensis.	
Ankalodous	Gen. et sp. nov	Valid	Shu et al.	Cambrian Series 3	Qiongzhusi (Chiungchussu) Formation	China	An arrow worm. The type species is A. sericus.	
Archaeochionelasmus	Gen. et sp. nov	Valid	Kočí et al.	Late Cretaceous (Cenomanian)	Bohemian Cretaceous Basin	Czech Republic	An animal of uncertain phylogenetic placement. Originally interpreted as a barnacle belonging to the group Balanomorpha and the superfamily Chionelasmatoidea; Gale & Skelton (2018) considered it to be a rudist bivalve instead. Genus includes new species A. nekvasilovae.	
Biskolites	Gen. et sp. nov	Valid	Valent, Fatka & Marek	Cambrian (Drumian)	Buchava Formation	Czech Republic	A member of Hyolitha. Genus includes new species B. iactans.	
Capinatator	Gen. et sp. nov	Valid	Briggs & Caron	Cambrian	Burgess Shale	Canada (British Columbia)	An arrow worm. The type species is C. praetermissus.	
Caryosyntrips camurus	Sp. nov	Valid	Pates & Daley	Cambrian	Burgess Shale; Langston Formation; Valdemiedes Formation?	Canada (British Columbia); United States (Utah); Spain?	A member of Radiodonta.	
Caryosyntrips durus	Sp. nov	Valid	Pates & Daley	Cambrian	Wheeler Shale	United States (Utah)	A member of Radiodonta.	
Cloudina ningqiangensis	Sp. nov	Valid	Cai et al.	Late Ediacaran		China		
Cloudina xuanjiangpingensis	Sp. nov	Valid	Cai et al.	Late Ediacaran		China		
Conchicolites rossicus	Sp. nov	Valid	Vinn & Madison	Ordovician (Katian)		Russia	A member of Cornulitida belonging to the family Cornulitidae.	
Conciliospongia	Gen. et sp. nov		Botting, Zhang & Muir	Late Ordovician	Wenchang Formation	China	A stem-demosponge of uncertain phylogenetic placement. The type species is C. anjiensis.	
Corallistes campanensis	Sp. nov	Valid	Świerczewska-Gładysz	Late Cretaceous (early Campanian)		Poland	A lithistid demosponge belonging to the family Corallistidae.	
Cretacimermis aphidophilus	Sp. nov	Valid	Poinar	Late Cretaceous (Cenomanian)	Burmese amber	Myanmar	A nematode belonging to the family Mermithidae.	
Eolorica	Gen. et sp. nov	Valid	Harvey & Butterfield	Cambrian (Furongian)	Deadwood Formation	Canada (Saskatchewan)	A member of the total group of Loricifera. The type species is E. deadwoodensis.	
Eorograptus spirifer	Sp. nov	Valid	Melchin, Lenz & Kozłowska	Silurian		Canada	A graptolite.	
Feiyanella	Gen. et sp. nov	Valid	Han et al.	Earliest Cambrian	Kuanchuanpu Formation	China	A Cloudina-like tubular microfossil. The type species is F. manica.	
Geoditesia jordaniensis	Sp. nov	Valid	Ungureanu, Ahmad & Farouk	Middle Jurassic (Callovian)		Jordan	A sponge.	
Glomerula gemmellaroi	Sp. nov	Valid	Sanfilippo in Sanfilippo et al.	Permian	"Pietra di Salomone" Limestone	Italy	A polychaete belonging to the family Sabellidae, a species of Glomerula.	
Guettardiscyphia zitti	Sp. nov	Valid	Vodrážka	Late Cretaceous (Turonian)	Bílá Hora Formation	Czech Republic	A hexactinellid sponge belonging to the family Cribrospongiidae.	
Inquicus	Gen. et sp. nov	Valid	Cong et al.	Early Cambrian	Chengjiang Lagerstätte	China	A tiny worm infecting members of the genera Cricocosmia and Mafangscolex. Genus includes new species I. fellatus.	
Keretsa	Gen. et sp. nov	Valid	Ivantsov	Late Precambrian	Zimnie Gory Formation	Russia (Arkhangelsk Oblast)	An early eumetazoan, showing similarities to the arthropod species Naraoia longicaudata. The type species is K. brutoni.	
Labechia yeongwolense	Sp. nov	Valid	Jeon et al.	Ordovician (Darriwilian)	Yeongheung Formation	South Korea	A stromatoporoid.	
Lepidocoleus kuangguoduni	Sp. nov	Valid	Gügel et al.	Devonian (Eifelian)	Nandan Formation	China	A machaeridian.	
'Linevitus' guizhouensis	Sp. nov	Valid	Sun et al.	Cambrian Stage 4	Balang Formation	China	A member of Hyolitha.	
Microdictyon cuneum	Sp. nov	Valid	Wotte & Sundberg	Cambrian		United States (Nevada)	A lobopodian.	
Microdictyon montezumaensis	Sp. nov	Valid	Wotte & Sundberg	Cambrian		United States (Nevada)	A lobopodian.	
Mughanniyyum	Gen. et sp. nov	Valid	Ungureanu, Ahmad & Farouk	Middle Jurassic (Callovian)		Jordan	A sponge. Genus includes new species M. hanium.	
Multiconotubus	Gen. et sp. nov	Valid	Cai et al.	Late Ediacaran		China	A Cloudina-like fossil. Genus includes new species M. chinensis.	
Neophrissospongia kacperskii	Sp. nov	Valid	Świerczewska-Gładysz	Late Cretaceous (early Campanian)		Poland	A lithistid demosponge belonging to the family Corallistidae.	
Orthrozanclus elongata	Sp. nov		Zhao & Smith in Zhao et al.	Cambrian Stage 3	Maotianshan Shales	China		
Ovatiovermis	Gen. et sp. nov	Valid	Caron & Aria	Cambrian	Burgess Shale	Canada (British Columbia)	A lobopodian belonging to the family Luolishaniidae. The type species is O. cribratus.	
Pachinion canaliculatum	Sp. nov	Valid	Świerczewska-Gładysz	Late Cretaceous (early Campanian)		Poland	A lithistid demosponge belonging to the family Corallistidae.	
Paratetragraptus cooperi	Sp. nov	Valid	VandenBerg	Ordovician (early Floian)		Australia	A graptolite belonging to the group Dichograptina and the family Phyllograptidae.	
Paratetragraptus? henrywilliamsi	Sp. nov	Valid	VandenBerg	Ordovician (early Floian)		Australia	A graptolite belonging to the group Dichograptina and the family Phyllograptidae.	
Paratetragraptus thomassmithi	Sp. nov	Valid	VandenBerg	Ordovician (early Floian)		Australia	A graptolite belonging to the group Dichograptina and the family Phyllograptidae.	
Plumulites lamonti	Sp. nov	Valid	Candela & Crighton	Silurian (Telychian)	Wether Law Linn Formation	United Kingdom	A machaeridian.	
Propomatoceros permianus	Sp. nov	Valid	Sanfilippo in Sanfilippo et al.	Permian	"Pietra di Salomone" Limestone	Italy	A polychaete belonging to the family Serpulidae, a species of Propomatoceros.	
Pseudoretiolites hyrichus	Sp. nov	Valid	Melchin, Lenz & Kozłowska	Silurian		Canada	A graptolite.	
Pyrgopolon (Septenaria) cenomanensis	Sp. nov	Valid	Kočí, Jäger & Morel	Late Cretaceous (Cenomanian)		France	A polychaete belonging to the family Serpulidae.	
Pyrgopolon (Turbinia?) gaiae	Sp. nov	Valid	Sanfilippo in Sanfilippo et al.	Permian	"Pietra di Salomone" Limestone	Italy	A polychaete belonging to the family Serpulidae, a species of Pyrgopolon.	
Radiofibrosclera	Gen. et sp. nov	Valid	Wu	Permian (Changhsingian)		China	A sclerosponge. The type species is R. laibinensis.	
Ratcliffespongia arivechensis	Sp. nov	Valid	Beresi et al.	Cambrian Series 3		Mexico	A reticulosan sponge of uncertain phylogenetic placement.	
Saccorhytus	Gen. et sp. nov	Valid	Han et al.	Earliest Cambrian		China	An animal of uncertain phylogenetic placement. Originally described as an early deuterostome related to vetulicolians and vetulocystids, but subsequently argued to be an ecdysozoan. The type species is S. coronarius.	
"Serpula" distefanoi	Sp. nov	Valid	Sanfilippo in Sanfilippo et al.	Permian	"Pietra di Salomone" Limestone	Italy	A polychaete belonging to the family Serpulidae.	
Serpula? pseudoserpentina	Sp. nov	Valid	Kočí, Jäger & Morel	Late Cretaceous (Cenomanian)		France	A polychaete belonging to the family Serpulidae.	
Silicunculus saaqqutit	Sp. nov	Valid	Peel	Cambrian Series 3		Greenland	A sponge.	
Singuuriqia	Gen. et sp. nov	Valid	Peel	Cambrian Stage 3	Sirius Passet Lagerstätte	Greenland	A member of Priapulida. Genus includes new species S. simoni.	
Siphusauctum lloydguntheri	Sp. nov	Valid	Kimmig, Strotz & Lieberman	Cambrian Stage 5	Spence Shale	United States (Utah)		
Tauricornicaris	Gen. et 2 sp. nov	Valid	Zeng et al.	Early Cambrian	Chengjiang Lagerstätte	China	Originally considered as member of Radiodonta, possibly a member of Hurdiidae, but denied in 2018. Genus includes new species T. latizonae and T. oxygonae.	
Thoracospongia lacrimiformis	Sp. nov	Valid	Peel	Cambrian Series 3		Greenland	A sponge.	
Tianzhushanella tolli	Sp. nov	Valid	Kouchinsky et al.	Cambrian	Medvezhya Formation	Russia	A member of Tianzhushanellidae (a group of animals of uncertain phylogenetic placement, possibly stem-brachiopods).	
Tshallograptus	Gen. et comb. et 3 sp. nov	Valid	VandenBerg	Ordovician (early Floian)		Australia; Canada	A graptolite belonging to the group Dichograptina and the family Phyllograptidae. The type species is "Graptolithus" fruticosus Hall (1858); genus also includes new species T. tridens, T. cymulus and T. furcillatus.	
Valospongia sonorensis	Sp. nov	Valid	Beresi et al.	Cambrian Series 3		Mexico	A reticulosan sponge of uncertain phylogenetic placement.	
Vittatusivermis	Gen. et sp. nov		Zhang et al.	Cambrian (Fortunian)	Yuhucun Formation	China	A worm-like organism, possibly a member of Bilateria of uncertain phylogenetic placement. The type species is V. annularius.	
Websteroprion	Gen. et sp. nov	Valid	Eriksson, Parry & Rudkin	Devonian (late Emsian-early Eifelian)	Kwataboahegan Formation	Canada (Ontario)	A eunicidan polychaete of uncertain phylogenetic placement. The type species is W. armstrongi.	

== Other organisms ==
=== Research ===
- Eoarchean (over 3,700 million years old) organic residues are reported from Isua, West Greenland by Hassenkam et al. (2017).
- Putative fossilized microorganisms that are at least 3,770 million and possibly 4,280 million years old are described from the Nuvvuagittuq belt (Quebec, Canada) by Dodd et al. (2017).
- Organic carbon contents are reported from the oldest metasedimentary rocks from northern Labrador (Canada) by Tashiro et al. (2017), who interpret the finding as the oldest evidence of organisms greater than 3.95 Ga; the study is subsequently criticized by Whitehouse et al. (2019).
- Potential biosignatures, including stromatolites, are reported from the newly discovered rocks recovered from ca. 3.48 billion years old Dresser Formation (Pilbara Craton, Australia) by Djokic et al. (2017).
- Lenticular structures known from the ~3.4 Ga Kromberg Formation (Kaapvaal craton, South Africa) are interpreted as organic Archean microfossils by Oehler et al. (2017).
- Fossils of early eukaryotes Tappania plana, Dictyosphaera macroreticulata and Valeria lophostriata are described from the early Mesoproterozoic Greyson Formation (Belt Supergroup, Montana, United States) by Adam et al. (2017).
- 2.4-billion-year-old filamentous fossils forming mycelium-like structures, considered to be either the oldest known fungi or members of an unknown branch of fungus-like mycelial organisms, are described from the Ongeluk Formation (South Africa) by Bengtson et al. (2017).
- A study on the anatomy of the fossils of Chuaria circularis recovered from the Tonian Liulaobei Formation (China) is published by Tang et al. (2017), who interpret Chuaria as most likely a simple multicellular organism (a colonial organism without cell differentiation).
- A study on the apatitic scale microfossils from the Fifteenmile Group (Yukon, Canada), indicating that the fossils document the existence of eukaryotic biomineralizing organisms approximately 810 million years ago, is published by Cohen et al. (2017).
- A study on the structure, morphology, and development of the large intracellular structures preserved in embryo-like microfossils from the Ediacaran Weng'an Biota (China) is published by Yin et al. (2017), who interpret these structures as likely cell nuclei.
- A study testing the suggested link between the appearance of large body size in rangeomorphs (organisms of uncertain phylogenetic placement, likely animals) in the Ediacaran and postulated regional increases in environmental nutrient levels is published by Hoyal Cuthill & Conway Morris (2017).
- A study on the internal morphology of Rangea from the Nama Group (Namibia), based on data obtained using X-ray micro-computed tomography, is published by Sharp et al. (2017).
- Smith et al. (2017) report the discovery of fossils of Gaojiashania from the Ediacaran strata of the Nama Group (Namibia) and a new fossil assemblage from the Ediacaran strata of the Wood Canyon Formation (Nevada, United States), including erniettomorphs and a variety of tubular body fossils.
- A study on the well-preserved Devonian calcareous nanicellid foraminiferans from the Świętokrzyskie Mountains (Poland) and their implications for the biomineralization style and affinities of Paleozoic fusulinid foraminiferans is published by Dubicka & Gorzelak (2017).
- Four forms of modern-looking gilled mushrooms, including two taxa belonging to the family Marasmiaceae, are described from the Cretaceous Burmese amber by Cai et al. (2017).

=== New taxa ===
Name	Novelty	Status	Authors	Age	Unit	Location	Notes	Images
Acadialithus	Gen. et 2 sp. nov	Valid	Howe	Late Jurassic (Tithonian)		Bulgaria; Offshore eastern Newfoundland, Canada; Offshore in the eastern Gulf of Mexico; Offshore of the northeast coast of the United States	A nannofossil. Genus includes new species A. dennei and A. valentinei.	
Adendorfia	Gen. et sp. nov	Valid	Worobiec et al.	Miocene		Germany	A fungus, probably a member of Chaetomiaceae. Genus includes new species A. miocenica.	
Algites philippoviensis	Sp. nov	Valid	Naugolnykh	Permian (Kungurian)	Philippovian Formation	Russia	A brown alga.	
Algites shurtanensis	Sp. nov	Valid	Naugolnykh	Permian (Kungurian)	Shurtan Formation	Russia	A brown alga.	
Alpinoschwagerina nagatoensis	Sp. nov	Valid	Kobayashi	Permian (Asselian)	Akiyoshi Limestone Group	Japan	A foraminifer belonging to the group Fusulinida.	
Amsassia argentina	Sp. nov	Valid	Carrera, Astini & Gomez	Early Ordovician	La Silla Formation	Argentina	A coral-like organism of uncertain phylogenetic placement.	
Asterina indodeightonii	Sp. nov	Valid	Vishnu et al.	Mid-Miocene to early Pleistocene		India	A fungus, a species of Asterina.	
Asterina mioconsobrina	Sp. nov	Valid	Vishnu et al.	Mid-Miocene to early Pleistocene		India	A fungus, a species of Asterina.	
Asterina miosphaerelloides	Sp. nov	Valid	Vishnu et al.	Mid-Miocene to early Pleistocene		India	A fungus, a species of Asterina.	
Asterina neocombreticola	Sp. nov	Valid	Vishnu et al.	Mid-Miocene to early Pleistocene		India	A fungus, a species of Asterina.	
Asterina neoelaeocarpi	Sp. nov	Valid	Vishnu et al.	Mid-Miocene to early Pleistocene		India	A fungus, a species of Asterina.	
Asterina presaracae	Sp. nov	Valid	Vishnu et al.	Mid-Miocene to early Pleistocene		India	A fungus, a species of Asterina.	
Baculogypsinella	Gen. et sp. nov	Valid	Matsumaru	Eocene		Philippines	A foraminifer. Genus includes new species B. eocenica.	
Blastanosphaira	Gen. et sp. nov	Valid	Javaux & Knoll	Mesoproterozoic	Mainoru Formation	Australia	A possible eukaryotic microorganism of uncertain phylogenetic placement. The type species is B. kokkoda.	
Bonniea makrokurtos	Sp. nov	Valid	Cohen, Irvine & Strauss	Tonian	Callison Lake Formation	Canada (Yukon)	A vase-shaped microfossil.	
Braarudosphaera pseudobatilliformis	Sp. nov	Valid	Alves, Lima & Shimabukuro	Early Cretaceous (Aptian)		Brazil	A haptophyte belonging to the family Braarudosphaeraceae.	
Carbonoschwagerina nipponica	Sp. nov	Valid	Kobayashi	Carboniferous (Kasimovian and Gzhelian)	Akiyoshi Limestone Group	Japan	A foraminifer belonging to the group Fusulinida.	
Cephalothecoidomyces	Gen. et sp. nov	Valid	Worobiec et al.	Neogene		Germany; Poland	A fungus, probably a member of Cephalothecaceae. Genus includes new species C. neogenicus.	
Chiphragmalithus muzylevii	Sp. nov	Valid	Musatov	Eocene (Ypresian)		Russia	A haptophyte.	
Cobios	Gen. et sp. nov	Valid	Du et al.	Ediacaran	Doushantuo Formation	China	A red alga. The type species is Cobios rubo.	
Curviacus	Gen. et sp. nov	Valid	Shen et al.	Ediacaran	Dengying Formation	China	A benthic modular organism consisting of serially arranged and crescent-shaped chambers. Genus includes new species C. ediacaranus.	
Cyanonema grandis	Sp. nov	Valid	Shi & Feng in Shi et al.	Early Mesoproterozoic	Gaoyuzhuang Formation	China	A member of Cyanobacteria belonging to the group Nostocales.	
Cycliocyrillium rootsi	Sp. nov	Valid	Cohen, Irvine & Strauss	Tonian	Callison Lake Formation; Chuar Group (Kwagunt Formation)	Canada (Yukon); United States	A vase-shaped microfossil. Originally described as a species of Cycliocyrillium, but subsequently transferred to the genus Obelix. Morais et al. (2019) corrected the suffix for the specific epithet to rootsii.	
Dalongicaepa	Gen. et sp. et comb. nov	Valid	Xiao & Suzuki in Xiao, Suzuki & He	Late Permian	Upper Dalong Formation	China; Thailand	A radiolarian belonging to the group Spumellaria and the family Spongotortilispinidae. The type species is D. bipolaris; genus also includes "Pseudospongoprunum" fontainei Sashida in Sashida et al. (2000).	
Denaricion	Gen. et sp. nov	Valid	Bengtson in Bengtson et al.	~1.6 billion years ago		India	An organism of uncertain phylogenetic placement, might be an alga or prokaryote. Genus includes new species D. mendax.	
Devisphaera	Gen. et sp. nov	Valid	Tang et al.	Late Mesoproterozoic – early Neoproterozoic	Madhubani Group	India	An organic-walled microfossil. Genus includes new species D. corallis.	
Discusphyton	Gen. et sp. nov	Valid	Wang, Wang & Du	Ediacaran	Doushantuo Formation	China	A macroalga of uncertain phylogenetic placement. Genus includes new species D. whenghuiensis.	
Fissumella	Gen. et sp. nov	Valid	Cruz-Abad et al.	Early Cretaceous (Albian)		Italy	A foraminifer. Genus includes new species F. motolae.	
Flabelloperforata	Gen. et sp. nov	Valid	Schlagintweit & Rashidi	Late Cretaceous (Maastrichtian)	Tarbur Formation	Iran	A foraminifer belonging to the group Loftusiida, possibly a member of the family Biokovinidae. Genus includes new species F. tarburensis.	
Gigadiacrodium	Gen. et comb. et sp. nov	Valid	Szczepanik, Servais & Żylińska	Cambrian (Furongian)	Alum Shale Formation; Elliott's Cove Formation	Canada; Iran; Italy; Poland; Sweden	An acritarch. The type species is "Veryhachium" martinum Pittau (1985); genus also includes new species G. vidalii.	
Gigantosphaeridium floccosum	Sp. nov	Valid	Agić, Moczydłowska & Yin	Early Mesoproterozoic	Ruyang Group	China	A microfossil.	
Gondwanagaricites	Gen. et sp. nov	Valid	Heads, Miller & Crane	Early Cretaceous (Aptian)	Crato Formation	Brazil	A gilled mushroom. Genus includes new species G. magnificus.	
Hagenococcus	Gen. et sp. nov	Valid	Krings et al.	Early Devonian	Rhynie chert	United Kingdom	A microorganism of uncertain phylogenetic placement, most likely an alga with affinities to the Chlorophyta or Streptophyta. Genus includes new species H. aggregatus.	
Haplophragmoides arcticus	Sp. nov	Valid	Kaminski, Waskowska & Chan	Middle Pleistocene		Arctic Ocean (Lomonosov Ridge)	A foraminifer.	
Jigulites titanicus	Sp. nov	Valid	Kobayashi	Carboniferous (Gzhelian) and Permian (Asselian)	Akiyoshi Limestone Group	Japan	A foraminifer belonging to the group Fusulinida.	
Limeta	Gen. et sp. nov	Valid	Morais, Fairchild & Lahr in Morais et al.	Neoproterozoic	Urucum Formation	Brazil	A vase-shaped microfossil. Genus includes new species L. lageniformis.	
Montiparus minensis	Sp. nov	Valid	Kobayashi	Carboniferous (Kasimovian)	Akiyoshi Limestone Group	Japan	A foraminifer belonging to the group Fusulinida.	
Nannoconus troelsenii	Sp. nov	Valid	Alves, Lima & Shimabukuro	Early Cretaceous (Aptian)		Brazil	A haptophyte belonging to the family Nannoconaceae.	
Oscillatoriopsis gigas	Sp. nov	Valid	Shi & Feng in Shi et al.	Early Mesoproterozoic	Gaoyuzhuang Formation	China	A member of Cyanobacteria belonging to the group Oscillatoriales.	
Palaeoamphora	Gen. et sp. nov	Valid	Morais, Fairchild & Lahr in Morais et al.	Neoproterozoic	Urucum Formation	Brazil	A vase-shaped microfossil. Genus includes new species P. urucumense.	
Palaeostromatus	Gen. et sp. nov	Valid	Dentzien-Dias, Poinar & Francischini	Permian (Guadalupian)	Rio do Rasto Formation	Brazil	An actinomycete. Genus includes new species P. diairetus.	
Paleohaimatus	Gen. et sp. nov	Valid	Poinar	Eocene-Miocene	El Mamey Formation (Dominican amber)	Dominican Republic	A member of Apicomplexa belonging to the group Piroplasmida. Genus includes new species P. calabresi.	
Parastaffelloides kanmerai	Sp. nov	Valid	Kobayashi	Carboniferous (Moscovian)	Akiyoshi Limestone Group	Japan	A foraminifer belonging to the group Fusulinida.	
Pentadinium darmirae	Sp. nov	Valid	Slimani & Ţabără in Ţabără et al.	Paleocene (Danian)	Izvor Formation; Runcu Formation	Romania	A dinoflagellate belonging to the group Gonyaulacales and the family Gonyaulacaceae.	
Persiella	Gen. et sp. nov	Valid	Schlagintweit & Rashidi	Late Cretaceous (Maastrichtian)	Tarbur Formation	Iran	A foraminifer belonging to the group Loftusiida, possibly a member of the family Spirocyclinidae. Genus includes new species P. pseudolituus.	
Pocillithus crucifer	Sp. nov	Valid	Lees, Bown & Young	Late Cretaceous (Turonian)		Tanzania	A haptophyte belonging to the family Papposphaeraceae.	
Pocillithus macleodii	Sp. nov	Valid	Lees, Bown & Young	Late Cretaceous (Turonian)		Tanzania	A haptophyte belonging to the family Papposphaeraceae.	
Quasifusulinoides grandis	Sp. nov	Valid	Kobayashi	Carboniferous (Kasimovian)	Akiyoshi Limestone Group	Japan	A foraminifer belonging to the group Fusulinida.	
Rafatazmia	Gen. et sp. nov	Valid	Bengtson in Bengtson et al.	~1.6 billion years ago		India	An alga of uncertain phylogenetic placement. Genus includes new species R. chitrakootensis.	
Ramathallus	Gen. et sp. nov	Valid	Sallstedt in Bengtson et al.	~1.6 billion years ago		India	A possible stem-florideophycean red algae. Genus includes new species R. lobatus.	
Schwagerina wakatakeyamensis	Sp. nov	Valid	Kobayashi	Permian (Asselian)	Akiyoshi Limestone Group	Japan	A foraminifer belonging to the group Fusulinida.	
Schwagerina watanabei	Sp. nov	Valid	Kobayashi	Permian (Asselian)	Akiyoshi Limestone Group	Japan	A foraminifer belonging to the group Fusulinida.	
Spearlithus	Gen. et 12 sp. nov	Valid	Da Gama	Pleistocene		Dominican Republic	A calcareous nannofossil of uncertain phylogenetic placement.	
Staffella subsphaerica	Sp. nov	Valid	Kobayashi	Carboniferous (Kasimovian and Gzhelian)	Akiyoshi Limestone Group	Japan	A foraminifer belonging to the group Fusulinida.	
Stradnerlithus? haynesiae	Sp. nov	Valid	Lees, Bown & Young	Late Cretaceous (Turonian)		Tanzania	A haptophyte belonging to the order Stephanolithiales and the family Stephanolithiaceae.	
Stradnerlithus wendleri	Sp. nov	Valid	Lees, Bown & Young	Late Cretaceous (Turonian)		Tanzania	A haptophyte belonging to the order Stephanolithiales and the family Stephanolithiaceae.	
Suraqalatia	Gen. et sp. nov	Valid	Görmüş, Ameen Lawa & Al Nuaimy	Late Cretaceous (Maastrichtian)		Iraq	A foraminifer belonging to the family Dicyclinidae. Genus includes new species S. brasieri.	
Synaptomitus	Gen. et sp. nov	Valid	Poinar	Eocene to Miocene	Dominican amber	Dominican Republic	Originally described as a fungus belonging to the group Basidiomycota, but this interpretation was challenged by Selosse et al. (2017). Genus includes new species S. orchiphilus.	
Syracosphaera antiqua	Sp. nov	Valid	Bown, Lees & Young	Late Cretaceous (Turonian)		Tanzania	A haptophyte belonging to the order Syracosphaerales and the family Syracosphaeraceae.	
Syracosphaera repagula	Sp. nov	Valid	Bown, Lees & Young	Late Cretaceous (Turonian)		Tanzania	A haptophyte belonging to the order Syracosphaerales and the family Syracosphaeraceae.	
Tarburina	Gen. et sp. nov	Valid	Schlagintweit, Rashidi & Barani	Late Cretaceous (late Maastrichtian)	Tarbur Formation	Iran	A foraminifer. Genus includes new species T. zagrosiana.	
Taruma	Gen. et sp. nov	Valid	Morais, Fairchild & Lahr in Morais et al.	Neoproterozoic	Urucum Formation	Brazil	A vase-shaped microfossil. Genus includes new species T. rata.	
Tortolithus foramen	Sp. nov	Valid	Lees, Bown & Young	Late Cretaceous (Turonian)		Tanzania	A haptophyte of uncertain phylogenetic placement.	
Veteronostocale grandis	Sp. nov	Valid	Shi & Feng in Shi et al.	Early Mesoproterozoic	Gaoyuzhuang Formation	China	A member of Cyanobacteria belonging to the group Nostocales.	
Windipila	Gen. et sp. nov	Valid	Krings & Harper	Early Devonian	Windyfield chert	United Kingdom	A fungus described on the basis of a reproductive unit. Genus includes new species W. spinifera.	
Xiaohongyuia	Gen. et sp. nov	Valid	Shi & Feng in Shi et al.	Late Paleoproterozoic	Dahongyu Formation	China	A probable eukaryotic microfossil. Genus includes new species X. sinica.	

== General paleontology ==
Research related to paleontology that either does not concern any of the groups of the organisms listed above, or concerns multiple groups.

- A study on the links between changes in the composition of exposed continental crust and oxygenation of the atmosphere in the Precambrian is published by Smit & Mezger (2017).
- A review of the progress in modeling the Snowball Earth atmosphere, cryosphere, hydrosphere and lithosphere, specifically as it pertains to Cryogenian geology and geobiology, is published by Hoffman et al. (2017).
- A revised record of fossil eukaryotic steroids during the Neoproterozoic is presented by Brocks et al. (2017), who argue that bacteria were the only notable primary producers in the oceans before the Cryogenian, and that rapid rise of marine planktonic algae to domination occurred in the narrow time interval between the Sturtian and Marinoan glaciations, 659–645 million years ago, likely driving the subsequent radiation of animals in the Ediacaran period.
- A study evaluating whether mass extinction events over the last 500 million year were caused by astronomical phenomena is published by Erlykin et al. (2017).
- A study on the water column geochemistry of the Yangtze Sea during the Ediacaran-Cambrian transition and its implications for the relationship between ocean oxygenation and Early Cambrian animal diversification is published by Zhang et al. (2017).
- A study on the links between the expansion of siliceous sponges and seawater oxygenation during the Ediacaran–Cambrian transition is published by Tatzel et al. (2017).
- A study on the factors influencing marine invertebrate diversity dynamics through the Phanerozoic is published by Cermeño et al. (2017).
- Edwards et al. (2017) identify a strong temporal link between the rising atmospheric oxygen levels and the Great Ordovician Biodiversification Event.
- A study on the impact of the drawdown of atmospheric carbon dioxide (caused by burial of organic carbon leading to the formation of coal) on the climate around the Carboniferous/Permian boundary is published by Feulner (2017).
- A comprehensive reconstruction of the Permian (Lopingian) Bletterbach Biota (Italy) and a review of other best-known Lopingian terrestrial associations containing both vertebrate and plant remains is published by Bernardi et al. (2017).
- A study on the causal connection between the Siberian Traps large igneous province magmatism and Permian–Triassic extinction event, identifying the initial emplacement pulse as likely to have triggered mass extinction, is published by Burgess, Muirhead & Bowring (2017).
- Viglietti, Rubidge & Smith (2017) review the tectonic setting of the Late Permian Karoo Basin (South Africa), provide an updated basin development model, and interpret their findings as indicating that the climatic changes associated with the Permian–Triassic extinction event were occurring much lower in the stratigraphy (and thus earlier) than previously documented.
- A summary of knowledge of the impact of Permian-Triassic mass extinction on reef ecosystems, and on their recovery after this extinction, is presented by Martindale, Foster & Velledits (2017).
- A study on benthic invertebrate communities from the Lower Triassic Werfen Formation (Italy), aiming to test whether carbon isotope perturbations during the Early Triassic were associated with biotic crises that impeded benthic recovery after the Permian–Triassic extinction event, is published by Foster et al. (2017).
- A study on the impact of the magmatic activity associated with the Central Atlantic magmatic province on the Triassic–Jurassic extinction event is published by Davies et al. (2017).
- A study on the volcanic activity at the end of the Triassic as indicated by mercury concentrations in sediments from around the world is published by Percival et al. (2017).
- A study on the oxygen levels in Earth's oceans during and after the Triassic–Jurassic extinction event as indicated by uranium isotopes in shallow-marine limestones in the Lombardy Basin (northern Italy) is published by Jost et al. (2017).
- A high-resolution stratigraphic chart for terrestrial Late Cretaceous units of North America and a study on the stratigraphic ranges of North American dinosaurs is published by Fowler (2017).
- A study on the impact that large amounts of soot injected into the atmosphere during the Cretaceous–Paleogene extinction event (probably caused by global wildfires) had on the climate is published by Bardeen et al. (2017).
- A study estimating the decrease of the air temperature and the duration of the climate cooling caused by Chicxulub impact at the end of the Cretaceous is published by Brugger, Feulner & Petri (2017).
- A study on the volume of the climate-active gases released from sedimentary rocks as a result of the Chicxulub impact, as well as on their effect on the global climate, is published by Artemieva, Morgan & Expedition 364 Science Party (2017).
- Kaiho & Oshima (2017) calculate the amounts of stratospheric soot and sulfate formed by a virtual asteroid impact at various global locations, and conclude that the Cretaceous–Paleogene extinction event was caused by the Chicxulub impact happening at the hydrocarbon-rich, sulfate-dominated area on the Earth's surface, and that an impact at a low–medium hydrocarbon area on Earth would be unlikely to cause mass extinction.
- A study on the data sets of molluscan fossils from the Cretaceous–Paleogene of the Seymour Island (Antarctica) is published by Tobin (2017), who identifies possible evidence of two separate extinction events, one prior to the Cretaceous–Paleogene boundary, and one simultaneous with the bolide impact at the Cretaceous–Paleogene boundary.
- A study on the behavioral and ecological diversification of animals that colonized land as indicated by trace fossils is published by Minter et al. (2017).
- A study on the age of the Cowie Harbour Fish Bed (Scotland, United Kingdom), containing fish and arthropod fossils (including the millipede Pneumodesmus newmani), is published by Suarez et al. (2017).
- A study on the preservation of skin and keratinous integumentary structures in tetrapod fossils through time is published by Eliason et al. (2017).
- A study on the differences between the tetrapod faunas at different latitudes during the early and middle Permian, as well as their implications for establishing whether the Olson's Extinction was a genuine event, is published by Brocklehurst et al. (2017).
- A study on the non-flying terrestrial tetrapod species richness through the Mesozoic and early Palaeogene is published by Close et al. (2017).
- A study on the evolution of the shape of brain and skull roof during the transition from early reptiles through archosauromorphs, including nonavian dinosaurs, to birds is published by Fabbri et al. (2017).
- A study on the structure and vulnerability of the food web in marine vertebrate assemblages prior to the Cretaceous–Paleogene extinction event as indicated by calcium isotope data from plesiosaurs and mosasaurs is published by Martin et al. (2017).
- Qvarnström et al. (2017) reconstruct fossil inclusions in two coprolites (produced by an insectivorous animal and a large aquatic predator) from the Late Triassic locality of Krasiejów (Poland) using propagation phase-contrast synchrotron microtomography.
- A study on the fossil inclusions in coprolite fragments (produced by medium to large-sized carnivores, possibly therocephalian therapsids or early archosauriforms) recovered from the Late Permian locality of Vyazniki (Russia) is published by Bajdek et al. (2017).
- A new tetrapod assemblage from the lowermost levels of the Triassic Chañares Formation (Argentina), dominated by fossils of Tarjadia ruthae, dicynodonts and cynodonts, and also including fossils of other pseudosuchians and rhynchosaurs, is described by Ezcurra et al. (2017), who also reinterpret Tarjadia ruthae and Archeopelta arborensis as erpetosuchid archosaurs.
- A study on the cosmopolitanism of terrestrial amniote faunas in the aftermath of the Permian–Triassic extinction event and Triassic–Jurassic extinction event is published by Button et al. (2017).
- Frese et al. (2017) determine the mineral and elemental composition of a range of fossils from the Talbragar fossil site (Australia) and their rock matrices using ultraviolet light-induced fluorescence/photoluminescence, X-ray fluorescence and X-ray diffractometry, and use those techniques to reveal anatomical details of animals and plants fossils that weren't discernible otherwise.
- A study on changes of the size of fossil marine shells and predatory drill holes in those shells during the Phanerozoic, as well as their implications for changes of predator-prey size ratio throughout the Phanerozoic, is published by Klompmaker et al. (2017).
- A study evaluating the utility of oxygen-isotope compositions of fossilised foraminifera tests as proxies for surface- and deep-ocean paleotemperatures, and its implications for inferring Late Cretaceous and Paleogene deep-ocean and high-latitude surface-ocean temperatures, is published by Bernard et al. (2017).
- A study on the glacial development and environmental changes in the Aurora Subglacial Basin (Antarctica) throughout the Cenozoic based on geophysical and geological evidence is published by Gulick et al. (2017).
- A study on the onset duration of the Paleocene–Eocene Thermal Maximum is published by Kirtland Turner et al. (2017).
- A study on the relationship between volcanic activity in the North Atlantic Igneous Province and the Paleocene–Eocene Thermal Maximum is published by Gutjahr et al. (2017).
- A study on the environment in the area corresponding to the present-day Amazon basin in the Miocene as indicated by data from the shark and ray fossils from the Pirabas Formation (Brazil) is published by Aguilera et al. (2017).
- A study on the impact of the Messinian salinity crisis on Mediterranean magmatism is published by Sternai et al. (2017).
- A study on the changes of ice sheets volume and sea level during the late Pliocene is published by de Boer et al. (2017).
- Pimiento et al. (2017) identify a previously unrecognized extinction event among marine megafauna at the end of the Pliocene.
- A study on the aridity in eastern Africa over the past 4.4 million years as indicated by oxygen isotope ratios in fossil herbivore tooth enamel, and on its implications for inferring the role of climate in shaping early hominin environments, is published by Blumenthal et al. (2017).
- Tierney, deMenocal & Zander (2017) reconstruct temperature and aridity in the Horn of Africa region spanning the past 200,000 years.
- A vertebrate fauna from the Pleistocene and Holocene of Sumba (Indonesia) is described by Turvey et al. (2017).
- A study on the modified mammalian bones from the Plio–Pleistocene of Ethiopia is published by Sahle, El Zaatari & White (2017), who interpret the marks on some of these bones as more likely to be produced by crocodiles than by hominids using stone tools.
- Hagstrum et al. (2017) report impact-related microspherules and elevated platinum concentrations found in fine-grained sediments retained within Late Pleistocene bison and mammoth skull fragments from Alaska and Yukon, and interpret the findings as evidence of repeated airbursts and ground/ice impacts associated with multiple episodes of cosmic impact.
- A study on changes in landscape moisture in the rangelands in Europe, Siberia and the Americas during the late Pleistocene as indicated by data from the bones of megaherbivores is published by Rabanus-Wallace et al. (2017).
