= Volyn biota =

Fossilized microorganisms from Ukraine

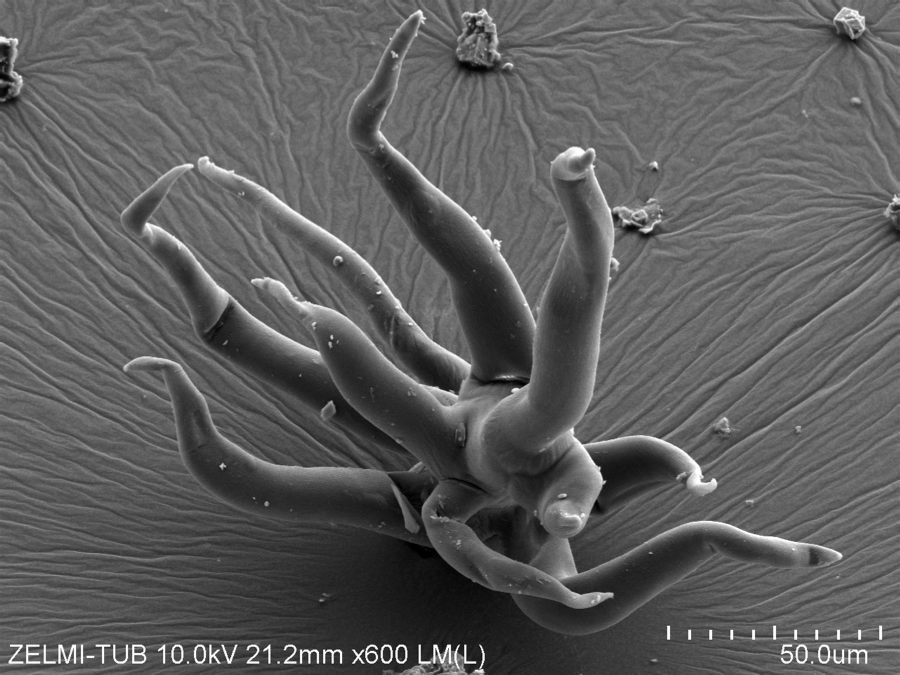
A sample of the Volyn biota with multiple filaments with claw-like ends growing from a common center

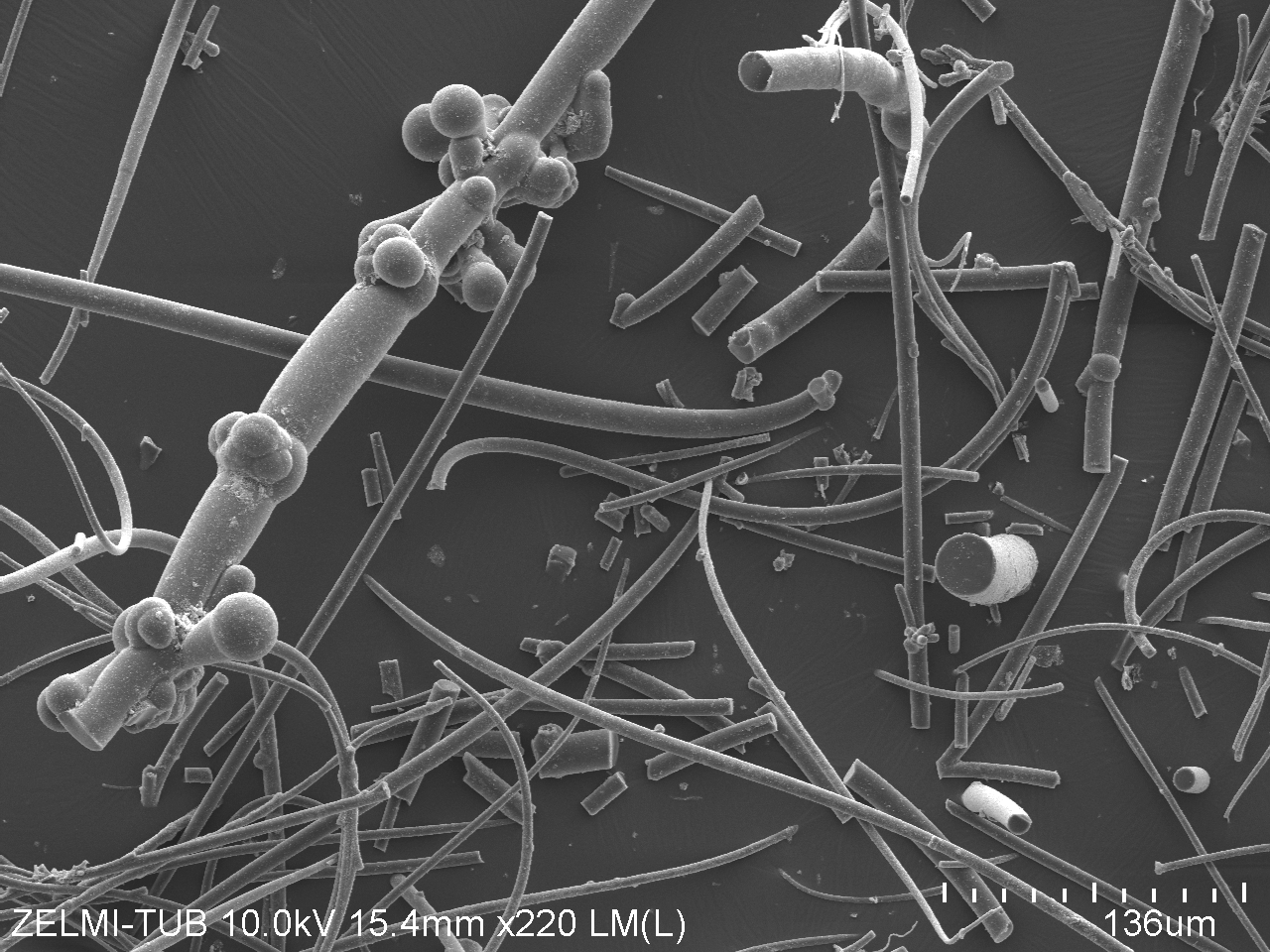
Volyn biota filaments with varying diameters

The Volyn biota are fossilized microorganisms found in rock samples from miarolitic cavities of igneous rocks collected in Zhytomyr Oblast, Ukraine. It is within the historical region of Volyn, hence the name of the find. Exceptionally well-preserved, they were dated to 1.5 Ga, within the "Boring Billion" period of the Proterozoic geological eon.

== History of the discovery ==
The samples of Volyn biota were found in samples from miarolitic pegmatites ("chamber pegmatites") collected from the Korosten Pluton of the Ukrainian Shield. They were described as early as in 1987, but interpreted as abiogenic formations. In 2000, these formations were reinterpreted as the fossilized cyanobacteria from geyser-type deposits. Until very recently the origin of the Korosten pegmatites was not fully understood, but they were dated to 1.8-1.7 Ga.

Franz et al. (2022, 2023), investigating newly recovered samples they date to 1.5 Ga, described the morphology and the internal structure of Volyn biota and reported the presence of different types of filaments, of varying diameters, shapes and branching in the studied organisms, and provided evidence of the presence of fungi-like organisms and Precambrian continental deep biosphere. Some fossils give evidence of sessility, while others of free-living lifestyle.

Usually Precambrian fossils are not well preserved, but the Volyn biota had exceptional conditions for fossilization in cavities with silicon tetrafluoride-rich fluids. The cavities also preserved them from further diagenetic-metamorphic overprint.

Volyn biota is an additional support of the claim that filamentous fossils dated to 2.4 Ga from the Ongeluk Formation (Griqualand West, South Africa) were also fungi-like organisms.

== See also ==
- Calymmian – First period of the Mesoproterozoic Era
