= Buskia =

Scientific classification
- Kingdom: Animalia
- Phylum: Bryozoa
- Class: Gymnolaemata
- Order: Ctenostomatida
- Family: Buskiidae
- Genus: Buskia; Alder, 1857

Genus of bryozoans

Buskia is a genus of bryozoans belonging to the family Buskiidae.

The genus has almost cosmopolitan distribution.

Species:

- Buskia australis Jullien, 1888
- Buskia fowleri Todd, 1996
- Buskia hachti Voigt, 1979
- Buskia inexspectata Voigt, 1979
- Buskia mogilensis Gostilovskaja, 1984
- Buskia nigribovis Todd, 1994
- Buskia nitens Alder, 1857
- Buskia repens O'Donoghue & O'Donoghue, 1923
- Buskia seriata Soule, 1953
- Buskia socialis Hincks, 1887
- Buskia waiinuensis Di Martino, Taylor, Gordon & Liow, 2017
