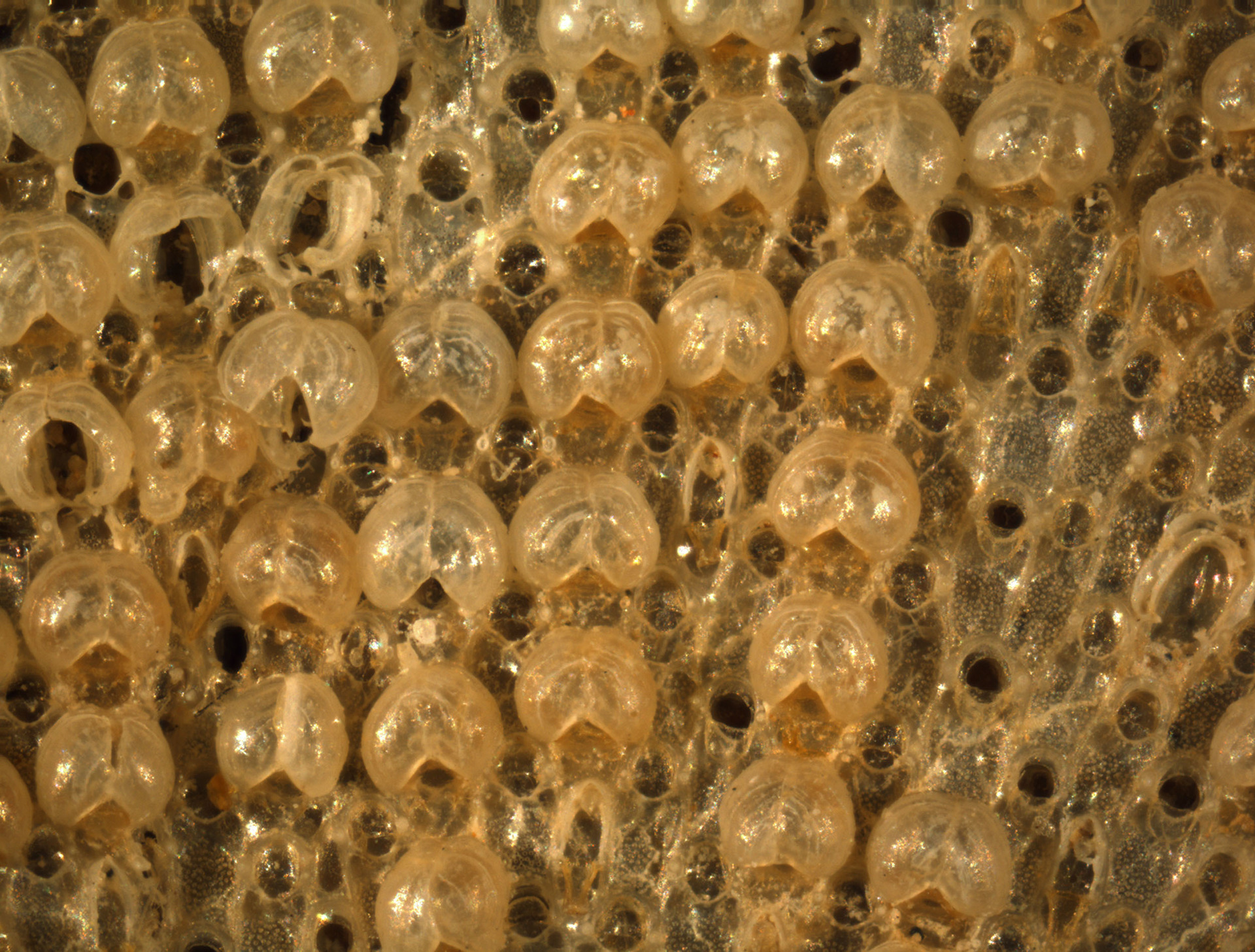
- Thalamoporella californica

Scientific classification
- Kingdom: Animalia
- Phylum: Bryozoa
- Class: Gymnolaemata
- Order: Cheilostomatida
- Family: Thalamoporellidae
- Genus: Thalamoporella; Hincks, 1887

= Thalamoporella =

Genus of bryozoans

Thalamoporella is a genus of bryozoans belonging to the family Thalamoporellidae.

The genus has a cosmopolitan distribution.

== Species ==
The following species are recognized in the genus Thalamoporella:

- Thalamoporella afrogothica Soule, Soule & Chaney, 1999
- Thalamoporella afrotubifera Soule, Soule & Chaney, 1992
- †Thalamoporella airensis Maplestone, 1911
- Thalamoporella andamanensis Soule, Soule & Chaney, 1992
- Thalamoporella annmargretae Martha & Scholz, 2025
- †Thalamoporella arabiensis Guha & Gopikrishna, 2004
- †Thalamoporella archiaci Guha & Gopikrishna, 2004
- †Thalamoporella badvei Sonar, Pawar & Dyaneshwar, 2022
- †Thalamoporella bhujensis Sonar, Pawar & Dyaneshwar, 2022
- †Thalamoporella bifoliata Ziko, 1988
- †Thalamoporella biperforata Canu & Bassler, 1923
- †Thalamoporella bitorquata Di Martino, Taylor & Portell, 2017
- †Thalamoporella burdigalensis Canu, 1916
- Thalamoporella californica (Levinsen, 1909)
- †Thalamoporella chubbi Lagaaij, 1959
- Thalamoporella contiguacurva Soule, Soule & Chaney, 1992
- Thalamoporella cookae Soule, Soule & Chaney, 1992
- Thalamoporella delicata Soule & Soule, 1970
- †Thalamoporella dennanti Maplestone, 1911
- Thalamoporella distorta Osburn, 1940
- †Thalamoporella dizodoensis Sakakura, 1935
- †Thalamoporella domifera Guha & Gopikrishna, 2004
- †Thalamoporella dorothea Guha & Gopikrishna, 2004
- †Thalamoporella elongata Canu & Bassler, 1935
- †Thalamoporella elongata Canu, 1916
- Thalamoporella evelinae Marcus, 1939
- Thalamoporella falcifera (Hincks, 1880)
- Thalamoporella floridana Osburn, 1940
- Thalamoporella gilbertensis (Maplestone, 1909)
- Thalamoporella gothica (Busk, 1856)
- Thalamoporella gracilata Tilbrook, Hayward & Gordon, 2001
- Thalamoporella granulata Levinsen, 1909
- Thalamoporella hamata Harmer, 1926
- Thalamoporella harmelini Soule, Soule & Chaney, 1999
- †Thalamoporella hastigera Di Martino, Taylor & Portell, 2017
- Thalamoporella hawaiiana Soule & Soule, 1970
- †Thalamoporella howchini Stach, 1936
- Thalamoporella inaequalis Cook, 1964
- Thalamoporella inarmata Soule, Soule & Chaney, 1992
- Thalamoporella indica (Hincks, 1880)
- Thalamoporella inornata Soule, Soule & Chaney, 1992
- †Thalamoporella kachchhensis Guha & Gopikrishna, 2004
- Thalamoporella karesansui Dick & Grischenko, 2016
- †Thalamoporella kharinadiensis Guha & Gopikrishna, 2004
- Thalamoporella komodoensis Winston & Heimberg, 1986
- Thalamoporella labiata (Levinsen, 1909)
- Thalamoporella lanceolata Soule, Soule & Chaney, 1999
- †Thalamoporella lata MacGillivray, 1895
- Thalamoporella linearis Canu & Bassler, 1929
- Thalamoporella lingulata Soule, Soule & Chaney, 1999
- Thalamoporella lioticha (Ortmann, 1890)
- †Thalamoporella longirostrata Maplestone, 1900
- Thalamoporella mayori Osburn, 1940
- Thalamoporella minigothica Soule, Soule & Chaney, 1999
- †Thalamoporella minuta Guha & Gopikrishna, 2004
- Thalamoporella molokaiensis Soule, Soule & Chaney, 1999
- †Thalamoporella neogenica Buge, 1950
- Thalamoporella novaehollandiae (Haswell, 1881)
- †Thalamoporella ocalana Cheetham, 1963
- †Thalamoporella ogivalis Di Martino, Taylor & Portell, 2017
- †Thalamoporella papalis Di Martino, Taylor & Portell, 2017
- Thalamoporella parviavicularia Soule, Soule & Chaney, 1992
- †Thalamoporella polygonalis Di Martino, Taylor & Portell, 2017
- Thalamoporella prima Canu & Bassler, 1920
- Thalamoporella prominens (Levinsen, 1909)
- Thalamoporella quadrata Gordon, 1984
- Thalamoporella rasmuhammadi Soule, Soule & Chaney, 1999
- †Thalamoporella rhombifera Guha & Gopikrishna, 2004
- Thalamoporella rozieri (Audouin, 1826)
- Thalamoporella semitorquata Soule, Soule & Chaney, 1992
- †Thalamoporella setosa Guha & Gopikrishna, 2004
- Thalamoporella sibogae Soule, Soule & Chaney, 1992
- †Thalamoporella sinensis Lu, 1989
- Thalamoporella sparsipunctata Levinsen, 1909
- †Thalamoporella spathulata David, 1949
- Thalamoporella spinosa Chaney, Soule & Soule, 1989
- Thalamoporella spiravicula Florence, Hayward & Gibbons, 2007
- Thalamoporella stapifera Levinsen, 1909
- †Thalamoporella sulawesiensis Pouyet & Braga, 1993
- †Thalamoporella tewarii Guha & Gopikrishna, 2004
- †Thalamoporella trepoculata Hu, 1986
- †Thalamoporella trimulla Hu, 1987
- Thalamoporella tubifera Levinsen, 1909
- Thalamoporella tupinamba Almeida, Larré & Vieira, 2021
- Thalamoporella vavauensis Soule, Soule & Chaney, 1999
- †Thalamoporella victoriensis Soule, Soule & Chaney, 1992
- †Thalamoporella vinjhanensis Guha & Gopikrishna, 2004
- †Thalamoporella voigti Guha & Gopikrishna, 2004
- Thalamoporella winstonae Soule, Soule & Chaney, 1999
- †Thalamoporella wynnei Guha & Gopikrishna, 2004
