= Acrothyra =

Acrothyra Temporal range: Miaolingian – ~506.5 Ma

Scientific classification
- Kingdom: Animalia
- Phylum: Brachiopoda
- Genus: †Acrothyra; Matthew, 1901

Type species
- Acrotreta proavia Matthew, 1899

Extinct genus of brachiopods

Acrothyra is an extinct genus of gregarious brachiopod that lived during the Middle Cambrian. Fossils of this genera can be found in Canada in formations such as the Burgess Shale and the Forteau Formation.

There are currently 253 specimens of Acrothyra that are known from the Greater Phyllopod bed, where they comprise 0.5% of the community.

== Taxonomy ==
=== Species ===
This genus currently contains five described species. They are listed below:

1. Acrothyra bonnia Skovsted, Knight, Balthasar & Boyce, 2017
2. Acrothyra gregaria Walcott, 1901
3. Acrothyra minor Walcott, 1905
4. Acrotreta proavia (Matthew, 1899) (Type species)
5. Acrothyra sera Mathew, 1902

== Description ==
Members of this genus have short apsacline ventral pseudointerarea with a triangular intertrough. The interior of the ventral valve is elongated with its apical process reaching about one-third of its valve length. It also has a triangular depression without apical pits.

== Notes ==
- BABCOCK, L. E., R. A. ROBISON, M. N. REES, S. PENG, AND M. R. SALTZMAN. 2007. The global boundary stratotype section and point (GSSP) of the Drumian Stage (Cambrian) in the Drum Mountains, Utah, USA. :, 30(002):85-95.
- MATTHEW, G. F. 1901. Acrothyra. A new genus of Etcheminian brachiopods. Nat. Hist. Soc. New Brunswick, Bull, 4:303-304.
- ROWELL, A. H. 1966. Revision of some Cambrian and Ordovician inarticulate brachiopods.
- YOCHELSON, E. L. 1961. The operculum and mode of life of Hyolithes. Journal of Paleontology:152-161.
