= Thalamoporellidae =

Scientific classification
- Kingdom: Animalia
- Phylum: Bryozoa
- Class: Gymnolaemata
- Order: Cheilostomatida
- Family: Thalamoporellidae; Levinsen, 1902

Family of bryozoans

Thalamoporellidae is a family of bryozoans belonging to the order Cheilostomatida.

== Genera ==
The following genera are recognised in the family Thalamoporellidae:

- Dibunostoma Cheetham, 1963
- Diploporella MacGillivray, 1885
- Hesychoxenia Gordon & Parker, 1991
- Marsupioporella Soule, Soule & Chaney, 1991
- †Reniporella Guha & Gopikrishna, 2004
- Thairopora MacGillivray, 1882
- Thalamoporella Hincks, 1887
