= Revalotrypa =

Revalotrypa Temporal range: Tremadocian-Hirnantian 477.7–443.7 Ma

Scientific classification
- Kingdom: Animalia
- Phylum: Bryozoa
- Class: Stenolaemata
- Order: †Esthonioporata
- Family: †Revalotrypidae
- Genus: †Revalotrypa; Bassler 1952

Extinct genus of bryozoans

Revalotrypa is an extinct genus of bryozoans of the family Revalotrypidae that lived during the late Ordovician period. It was initially placed within the order Trepostomatida, but later moved to Cystoporida, a classification supported by the discovery of the very similar genus Lynnopora, which possesses lunaria in its autozooidal apertures, a quality distinctive of Cystoporida.

== Species ==
The following species are recognized:

- †Revalotrypa arborea Modzalevskaya 1953
- †Revalotrypa duplex Modzalevskaya 1953
- †Revalotrypa eugeniae Gorjunova 1988
- †Revalotrypa gibbosa Bassler 1911
- †Revalotrypa honguedensis Ernst and Munnecke 2009
- †Revalotrypa huoi Yang 1957
- †Revalotrypa inopinata Fedorov et al. 2017
- †Revalotrypa krestensis Koromyslova 2008
- †Revalotrypa maculosa Nekhorosheva 2003
- †Revalotrypa papillaris Modzalevskaya 1953
- †Revalotrypa ramosa Ernst et al. 2015
- †Revalotrypa rotundicellularis Modzalevskaya 1953
