= Metrarabdotosidae =

Scientific classification
- Kingdom: Animalia
- Phylum: Bryozoa
- Class: Gymnolaemata
- Order: Cheilostomatida
- Family: Metrarabdotosidae

Family of bryozoans

Metrarabdotosidae is a family of bryozoans belonging to the order Cheilostomatida.

Genera:

- Aequilumina Gontar, 2002
- Biavicularium Cheetham, 1968
- Metrarabdotos Canu, 1914
- Polirhabdotos Hayward & Thorpe, 1987
