= Buskiidae =

Scientific classification
- Kingdom: Animalia
- Phylum: Bryozoa
- Class: Gymnolaemata
- Order: Ctenostomatida
- Family: Buskiidae

Family of bryozoans

Buskiidae is a family of bryozoans belonging to the order Ctenostomatida.

Genera:

- Buskia Alder, 1857
- Cryptopolyzoon Dendy, 1900
