= Scale microfossils =

Fossil mineralised plates

Apatitic scale microfossils are a group of reticulate phosphatic plates found in the Neoproterozoic (810 million years ago) strata of the Fifteenmile Group, Yukon, Canada. They represent some of the earliest examples of biologically induced biomineralization, using the mineral hydroxyapatite.
