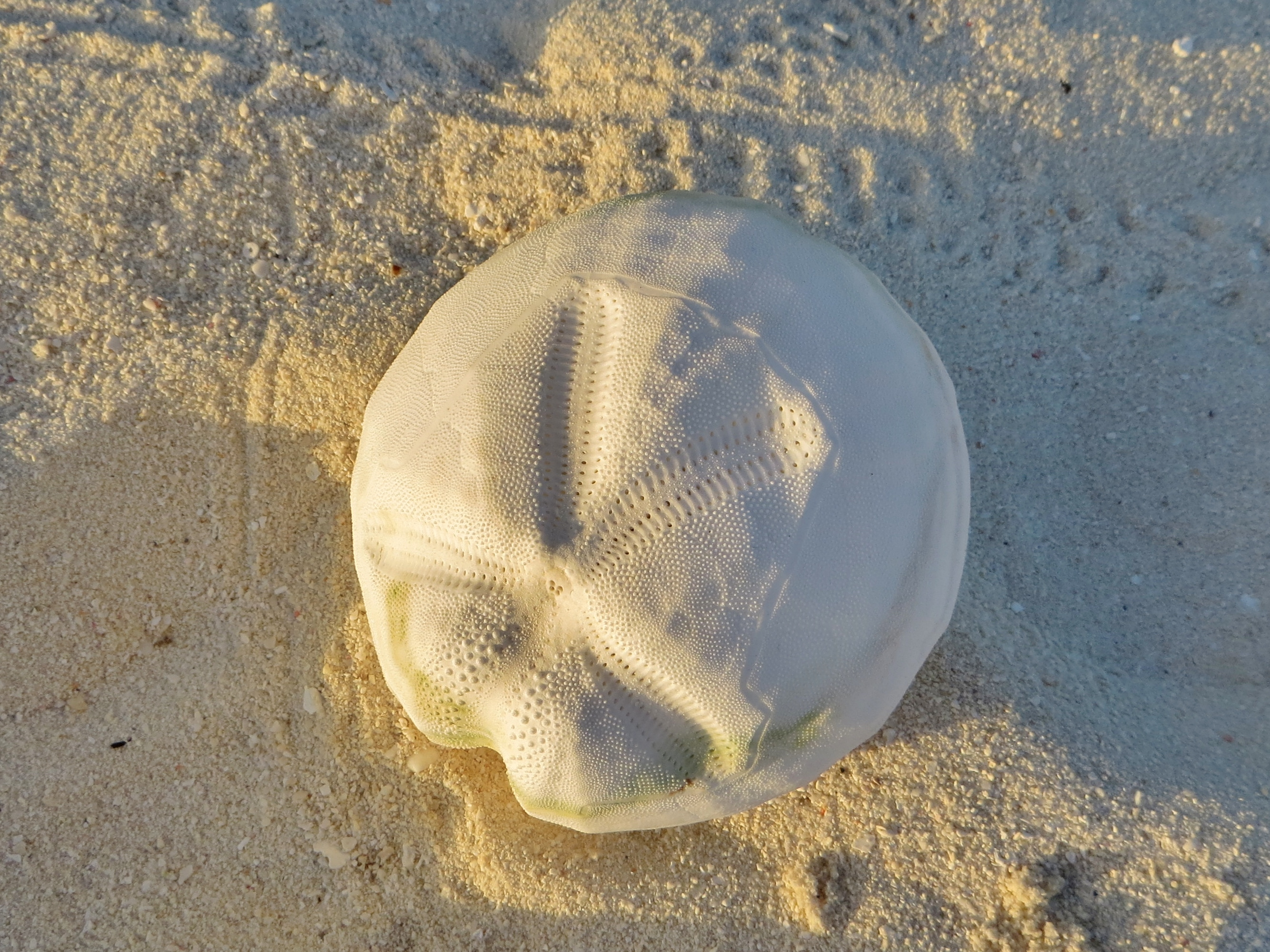
- Metalia sternalis

Scientific classification
- Kingdom: Animalia
- Phylum: Echinodermata
- Class: Echinoidea
- Order: Spatangoida
- Family: Brissidae
- Genus: Metalia; Gray, 1855

= Metalia =

Genus of echinoderms

Metalia is a genus of echinoderms belonging to the family Brissidae.

The genus has almost cosmopolitan distribution.

Species:

- Metalia agariciformis Duncan & Sladen
- Metalia angustus de Ridder, 1984
- Metalia cartagensis Sánchez Roig, 1949
- Metalia dicrana H.L. Clark, 1917
- Metalia dubia Arnold & H.L. Clark, 1934
- Metalia jamaicensis Arnold & H.L. Clark, 1934
- Metalia kermadecensis Baker & Rowe, 1990
- Metalia latissima H.L. Clark, 1925
- Metalia nobilis Verrill, 1867
- Metalia palmeri Sánchez Roig, 1953
- Metalia pelagica Nisiyama, 1968
- Metalia persica (Mortensen, 1940)
- Metalia robillardi (de Loriol, 1876)
- Metalia spatagus (Linnaeus, 1758)
- Metalia sternalis (Lamarck, 1816)
- Metalia townsendi (Bell, 1904)
- Metalia waylandi Stockley, 1927
