= Tramore Limestone =

Geologic formation in Ireland

- Stratigraphic range: Ordovician
- Type: Formation

Lithology
- Primary: Limestone

Location
- Country: Ireland

The Tramore Limestone is a geologic formation in Ireland. The formation preserves fossils dating back to the Ordovician period.

== See also ==
- List of fossiliferous stratigraphic units in Ireland
