= Ongeluk Large Igneous Province =

Large igneous province in South Africa

Kaapvaal craton.

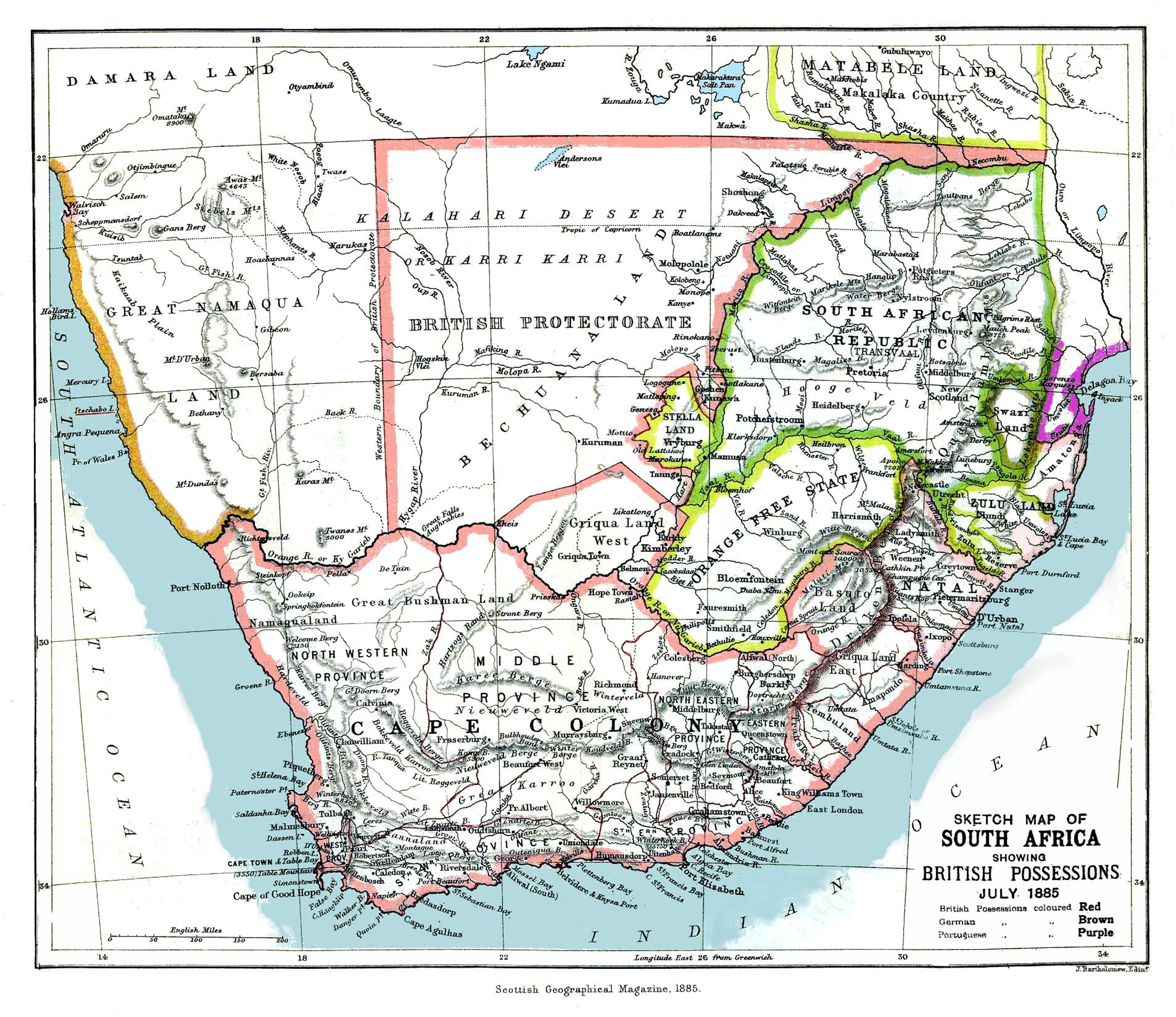
Griqualand West (in the centre of the map) in South Africa, July 1885.

The Ongeluk Large Igneous Province (Ongeluk LIP) is an early Paleoproterozoic large igneous province which resulted from the Ongeluk magmatic event, whose remnants are preserved on the Kaapvaal craton, within its South African part. The Ongeluk LIP was defined in 2017 (Gumsley et al., 2017). It consists of the Ongeluk Formation within the Griqualand West sub-basin of the Neoarchean to Paleoproterozoic Transvaal Supergroup and its feeders and an associated dolerite dyke swarm.

Filamentous fossils dated to 2.4 Ga were found in basalt samples from the Ongeluk Formation, which were suggested to be fossils of fungi-like organisms.
