= Forteau Formation =

Geologic formation in Canada

- Stratigraphic range: Series 2 ("Upper Lower Cambrian")
- Type: Formation

Location
- Region: Newfoundland and Labrador
- Country: Canada

The Forteau Formation is a geologic formation in Newfoundland and Labrador. It preserves fossils dating back to the Cambrian period.

== Age ==
A Dyerian trilobite fauna places it predominantly in the Bonnia‒Olenellus trilobite zone

== Fauna ==
Among its fauna are small carbonaceous fossils and brachiopods and trilobites

== See also ==
- List of fossiliferous stratigraphic units in Newfoundland and Labrador
