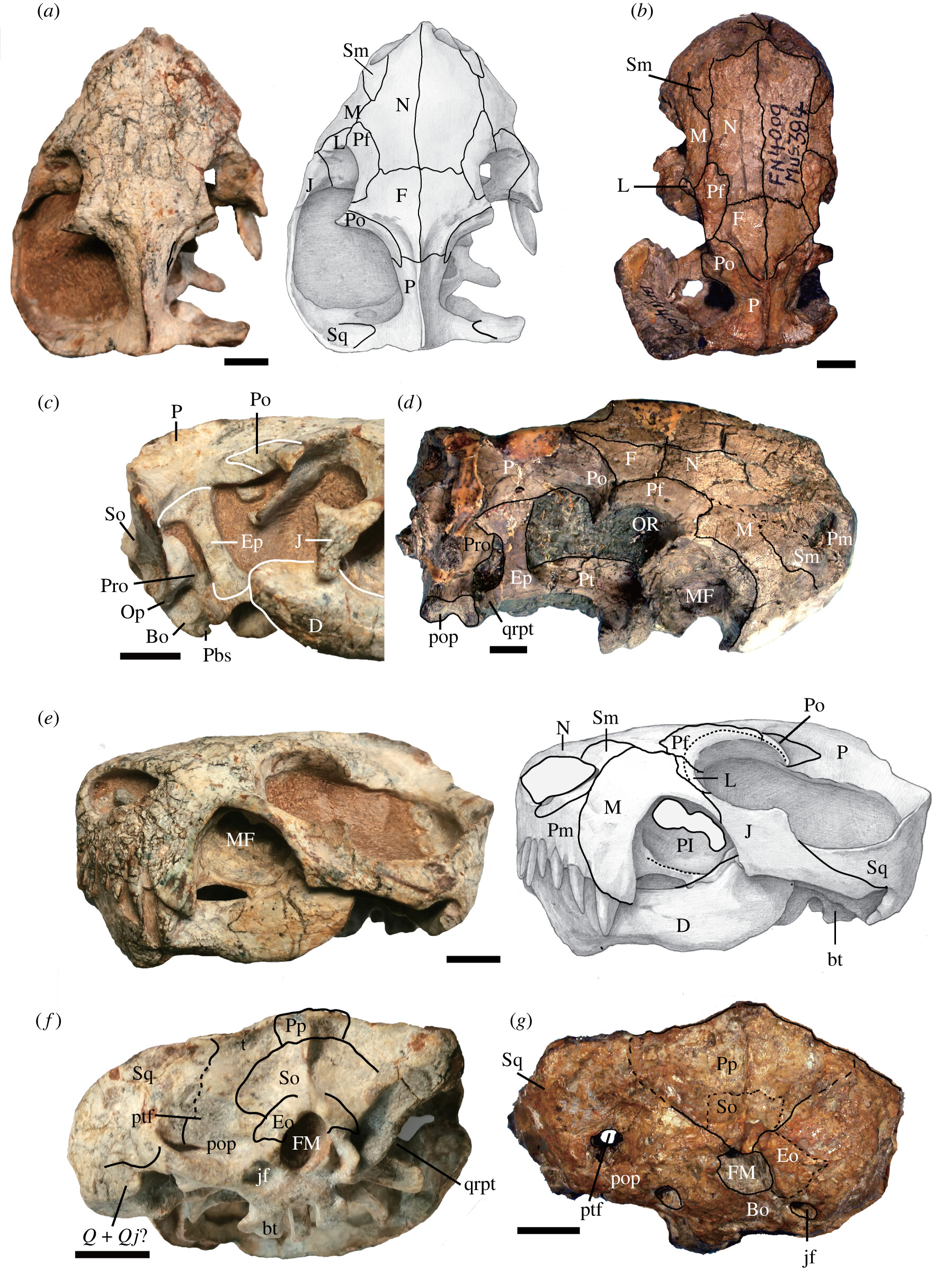
- Skull of E. liuyudongi from the top (a), sides (c, e), and back (f), and skulls of E. mirabilis from the top (b; BP/1/4009), side (d; NHMUK R5696), and back (g; NHMUK R5696)

Scientific classification
- Kingdom: Animalia
- Phylum: Chordata
- Clade: Synapsida
- Clade: Therapsida
- Clade: †Therocephalia
- Family: †Akidnognathidae
- Genus: †Euchambersia; Broom, 1931

Type species
- †Euchambersia mirabilis Broom, 1931

Other species
- †Euchambersia liuyudongi Liu & Abdala, 2022

= Euchambersia =

Euchambersia Temporal range: Wuchiapingian

Extinct genus of therapsid from Late Permian South Africa and China

Euchambersia is an extinct genus of therocephalian therapsids that lived during the Late Permian in what is now South Africa and China. The genus contains two species. The type species E. mirabilis was named by paleontologist Robert Broom in 1931 from a skull missing the lower jaw. A second skull, belonging to a probably immature individual, was later described. In 2022, a second species, E. liuyudongi, was named by Jun Liu and Fernando Abdala from a well-preserved skull. It is a member of the family Akidnognathidae, which historically has also been referred by as the synonymous Euchambersiidae (named after Euchambersia).

Euchambersia was a small and short-snouted therocephalian, possessing large canines as is typical of the group. However, it is notable among therocephalians for possessing ridges on its canines and a large indentation in the side of the skull. It has been proposed that these structures supported a venom delivery mechanism. If this statement turns out to be true, then it would be one of the oldest known tetrapods to have this characteristic. In 2017, the internal structure of the skull of E. mirabilis has been used as stronger evidence in favour of the hypothesis that it was venomous; other possibilities, such as the indentation supporting some sort of sensory organ, still remain plausible.

== Discovery and naming ==
Video showing deformation correction of the holotype skull of E. mirabilis

The genus Euchambersia, more specifically the type species E. mirabilis, was first described in 1931 by Robert Broom based on a distorted fossil skull that he had previously discovered in the South African farm of Vanwyksfontein, owned by a Mr. Greathead, near the town of Norvalspont. This specimen, which constitutes the holotype, is now housed in the Natural History Museum, London, under the number NHMUK R5696. Describing the taxon as "the most remarkable therocephalian ever discovered", Broom named it after the eminent publisher and evolutionary thinker Robert Chambers, whose Vestiges of the Natural History of Creation was considered by Broom to be "a very remarkable work" though "sneered at by many". In 1966, a second, smaller skull of the same species, was discovered at the farm of Waschbank, located about 8 km (5.0 mi) from the type locality. It was first figured in 1977 by James Kitching, although he provided no description. This specimen is now catalogued as BP/1/4009 by the Evolutionary Studies Institute of the University of the Witwatersrand, where it is stored. The two known skulls of E. mirabilis, both lacking their lower jaws, originated from the same general layer of rock, in the upper Cistecephalus Assemblage Zone of the Beaufort Group within the Karoo Supergroup. The Cistecephalus AZ has been dated to the Wuchiapingian stage of the Late Permian, between 256.2 and 255.2 million years old.

In 2022, Jun Liu and Fernando Abdala described a second species, E. liuyudongi, based on a well-preserved skull with an associated lower jaw, catalogued as IVPP V 31137 in the collections of the Institute of Vertebrate Paleontology and Paleoanthropology. Few postcranial remains, including six vertebrae and some rib fragments, also come from this specimen, but they are not described by the two authors. The specific epithet is named in honor of Liu Yu-Dong, the technician who discovered the holotype specimen in 2020. This species originated from the Naobaogou Formation of Inner Mongolia, which is dated more broadly to the Lopingian epoch (which contains the Wuchiapingian). The formation is divided into three members based on cycles of sedimentation, numbere as members I, II, and III from oldest to youngest; E. liuyudongi originates from member I. Liu and colleagues had previously described a number of other new species from the middle portion of the Naobaogou Formation, which were among the 80 specimens that had been excavated from at least three field seasons after 2009.

== Description ==
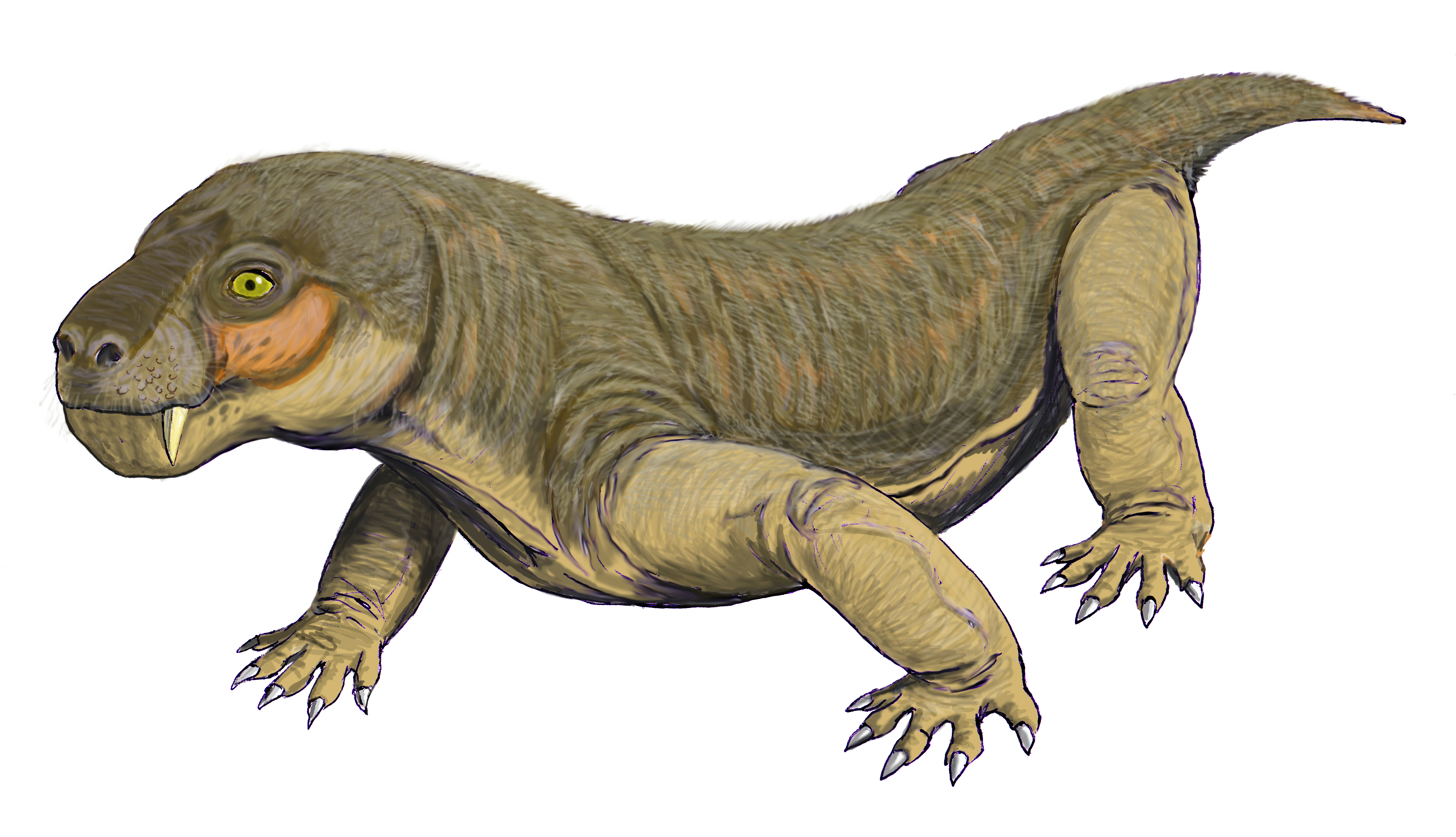
Life restoration of E. mirabilis showing hypothetical body

E. mirabilis was small and short-snouted (the snout being about half of the skull length) for a therocephalian, with the type skull having a reconstructed length of approximately 11.6 cm (4.6 in), accounting for crushing and deformation in the fossil. The second known skull belonged to a smaller individual, with a length of 8 cm (3.1 in); it was probably immature, judging by the lack of fusion in the skull. The type skull of E. liuyudongi measures 7 cm (2.8 in) in length and has a shorter snout (less than 40% of the skull length).

According to the initial description, the eye socket of E. mirabilis was rather small. The branches of the postorbital and jugal that usually surround the back and bottom of the eye socket in therocephalians appear to be either very reduced or absent entirely. Meanwhile, the top of the eye socket is formed by the prefrontal, and the frontal is also small. The skull does not bear a pineal foramen. Like Whaitsia, the pterygoid and palatine of the palate are not separated from the transpalatine, further to the side of the jaw, by any sort of opening. E. liuyudongi differs from E. mirabilis in several details of these bones: the frontal bone separates the prefrontal from contacting the postorbital, and the postorbital fenestrae at the back of the skull are slit-like instead of rounded. Additionally, the epipterygoid and prootic of the braincase are disconnected in E. liuyudongi.

=== Teeth ===
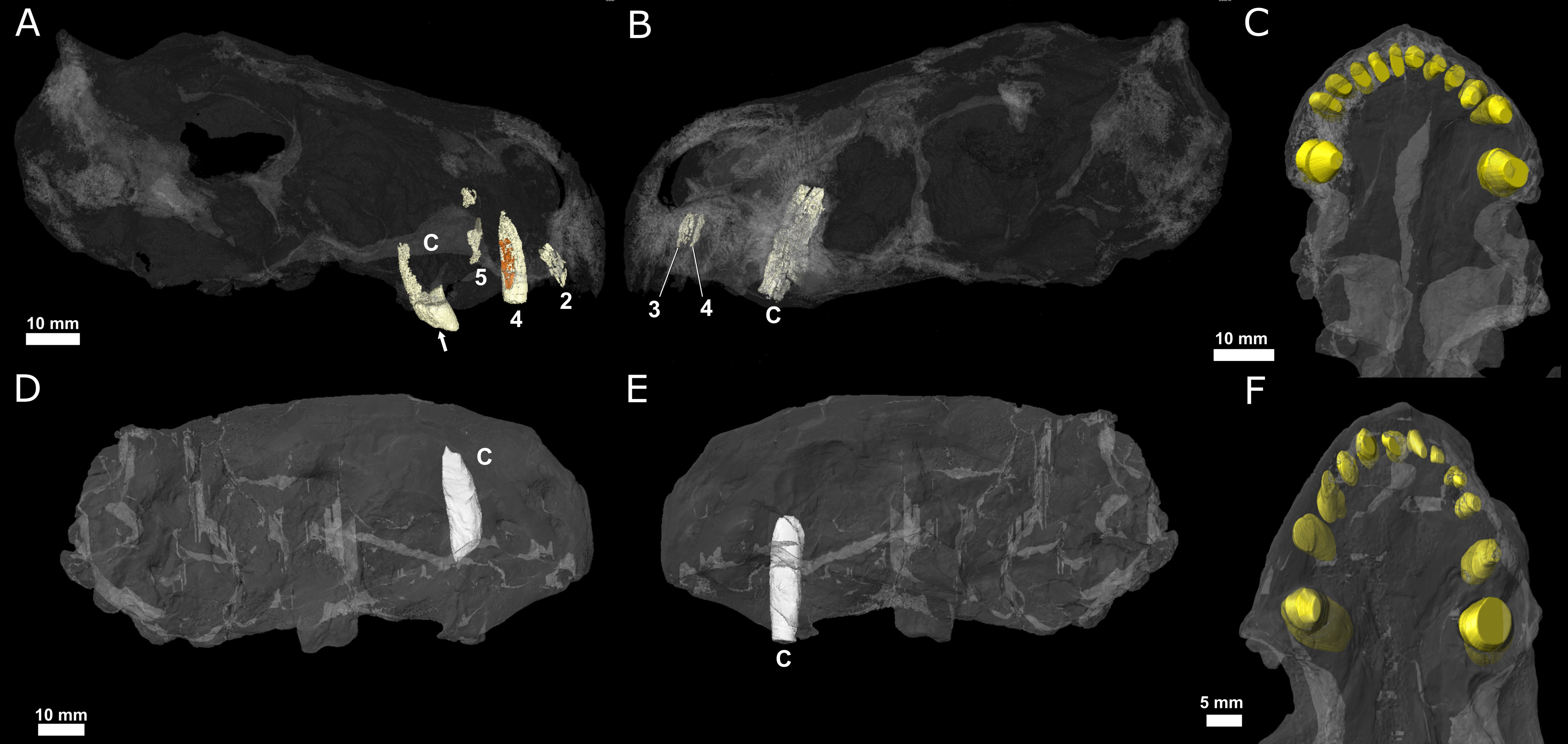
Preserved and reconstructed tooth rows of the second (A-C) and type (D-F) specimens of E. mirabilis

Although the skulls of E. mirabilis are incompletely preserved, CT scanning suggests that each premaxilla held five incisors, with the sockets becoming progressively larger from the first to the fifth incisor. Like other theriodonts, the crowns of the incisors are conical; they also lack serrations, unlike gorgonopsians and scylacosaurian therocephalians. The interior edge of the incisors seems to be slightly concave, and the back edge appears to have a ridge. The smaller specimen has a displaced incisor preserved within its nasal cavity; it is more strongly recurved and has wear marks on its top edge, suggesting that it is probably a lower incisor. Its fourth incisor also has a replacement tooth growing behind it, accompanied by resorption of the root.

The type specimen of E. mirabilis preserves the right canine. Like other therocephalians, its canine was very large, resulting in a specialized predatory lifestyle that incorporates a sabertooth bite into prey killing. It is round in cross-section, and bears a prominent ridge on the side of its front surface. Immediately beside this ridge is a shallow depression that becomes wider near the top of the tooth, which is probably the same structure as the groove interpreted by some authors. Unlike E. mirabilis, however, the canines of E. liuyudongi had neither ridges nor grooves. Theriodonts usually replace their teeth in an alternating (or distichial) pattern, such that the canine tooth is always functional; both skulls of E. mirabilis show no sign of any replacement canines developing, suggesting that it was reliant on having both canines present and functional simultaneously.

=== Maxillary fossa and associated canals ===
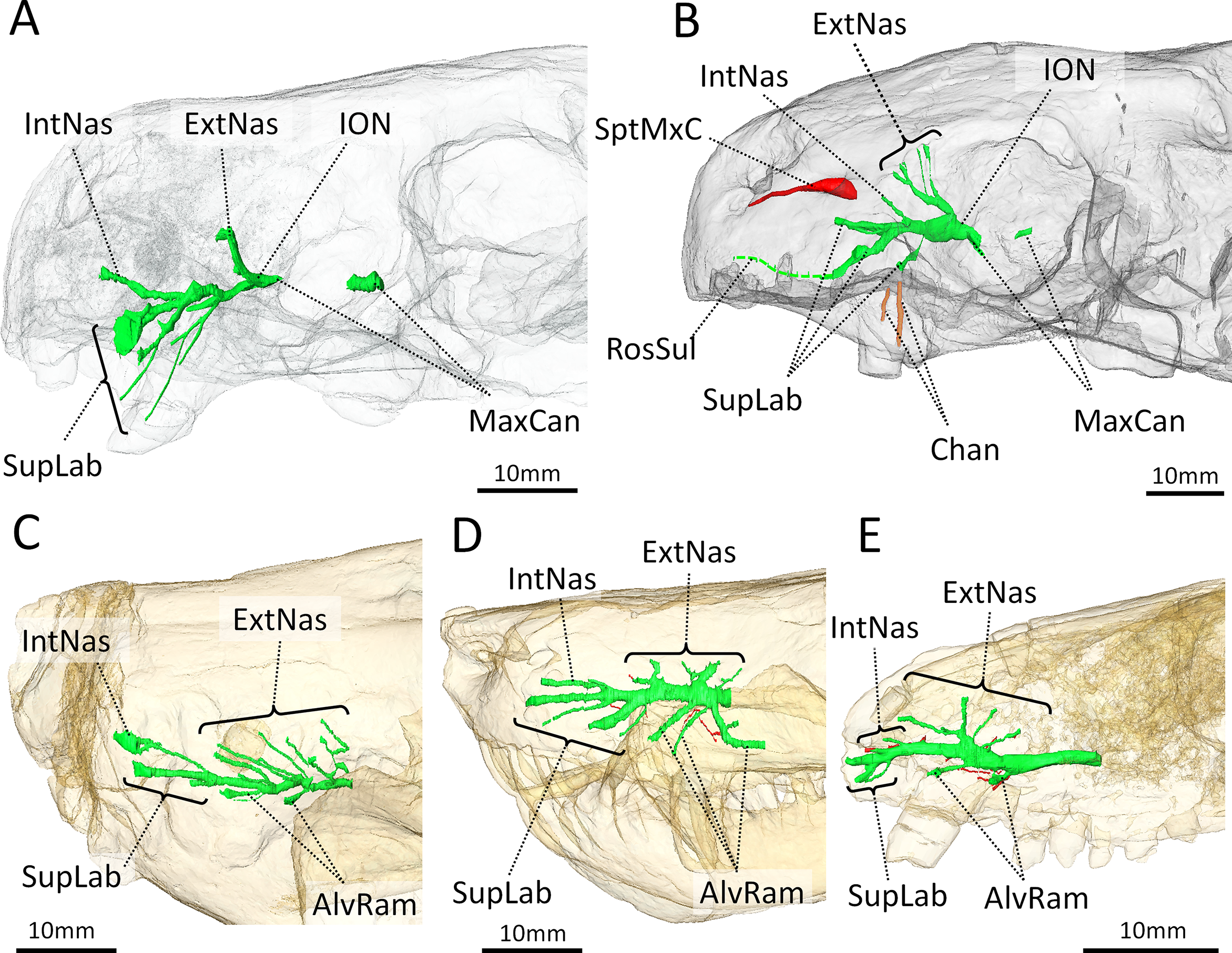
3D reconstruction of the maxillary canals of the two E. mirabilis skulls (A, BP/1/4009; B, NHMUK 5696, the holotype) from CT scans, compared with those of other therapsids (C, Bauria; D, Olivierosuchus; E, Thrinaxodon).

Behind the incisors and canines, there were no additional teeth in both the upper and lower jaws (as confirmed by E. liuyudongi). Where teeth would be located in therocephalians that do have teeth behind the canines, there was instead a large depression, or fossa, on the side of the maxilla, which was also bounded below by part of the lacrimal and possibly part of the jugal. This fossa is 48% the length of the jaw in the type specimen of E. mirabilis, and 38% in the second skull. In both skulls, this fossa is divided into two parts: a shallower ridge on top, and a larger and deeper depression on the bottom. A wide furrow beginning behind the canine contacts the bottom of the fossa and then passes into the interior of the mouth. The bottom portion of the fossa is strongly pitted and bears a small opening, or foramen, on both the front and back surfaces. In E. liuyudongi, this fossa is deeper still; a bar of the maxilla caps the top of the fossa and contacts the jugal, and the inner wall of the fossa has a large opening to the nasal cavity. Its fossa nearly reaches the mid-height of the snout.

CT scanning shows that the openings of E. mirabilis lead to canals that connect to the trigeminal nerve, which controls facial sensitivity. The forward-directed canal also splits into the three main branches of the infraorbital nerve, all of which connect to the socket of the canine; the junction occurs about 3–6 millimetres (0.12–0.24 in) along the canal, another point of variation between the two skulls. The top branch, the external nasal ramus, splits into four branches in the type skull, but it does not split in the second skull. In other therapsids like Thrinaxodon, Bauria, and Olivierosuchus, the external nasal ramus generally splits into three or more branches. All of these canals would have brought nerves and nutrient-rich tissue to the root of the canines and the rest of the upper jaw.

== Classification ==
In 1934, Euchambersia was assigned to the newly named family Euchambersiidae by Lieuwe Dirk Boonstra. Boonstra initially misspelt the name as Euchambersidae (which is improper Latin), and was subsequently corrected by Friedrich von Huene in 1940. Euchambersiidae was initially considered to be separate from the families Moschorhinidae and Annatherapsididae; in 1974, Christiane Mendez recognized these groups as closely related subfamilies (renamed Annatherapsidinae, Moschorhininae and Euchambersiinae) within the wider group of her redefined Moschorhinidae (although she also referred to it as Annatherapsididae).

The 1986 phylogenetic analysis of James Hopson and Herb Barghusen supported Mendez's hypothesis of three subfamilies within Moschorhinidae, but they elected to use the name Euchambersiidae. In 2009, Adam Huttenlocker argued that the names Annatherapsididae, Moschorhinidae, and Euchambersiidae are junior synonyms of Akidnognathidae, since Akidnognathus (which also belongs in the same family) was named first before any other member of the family. This name has reached wider acceptance among researchers. Huttenlocker and Christian Sidor also later redefined Moschorhininae as all of Akidnognathidae save for Annatherapsidus and Akidnognathus.

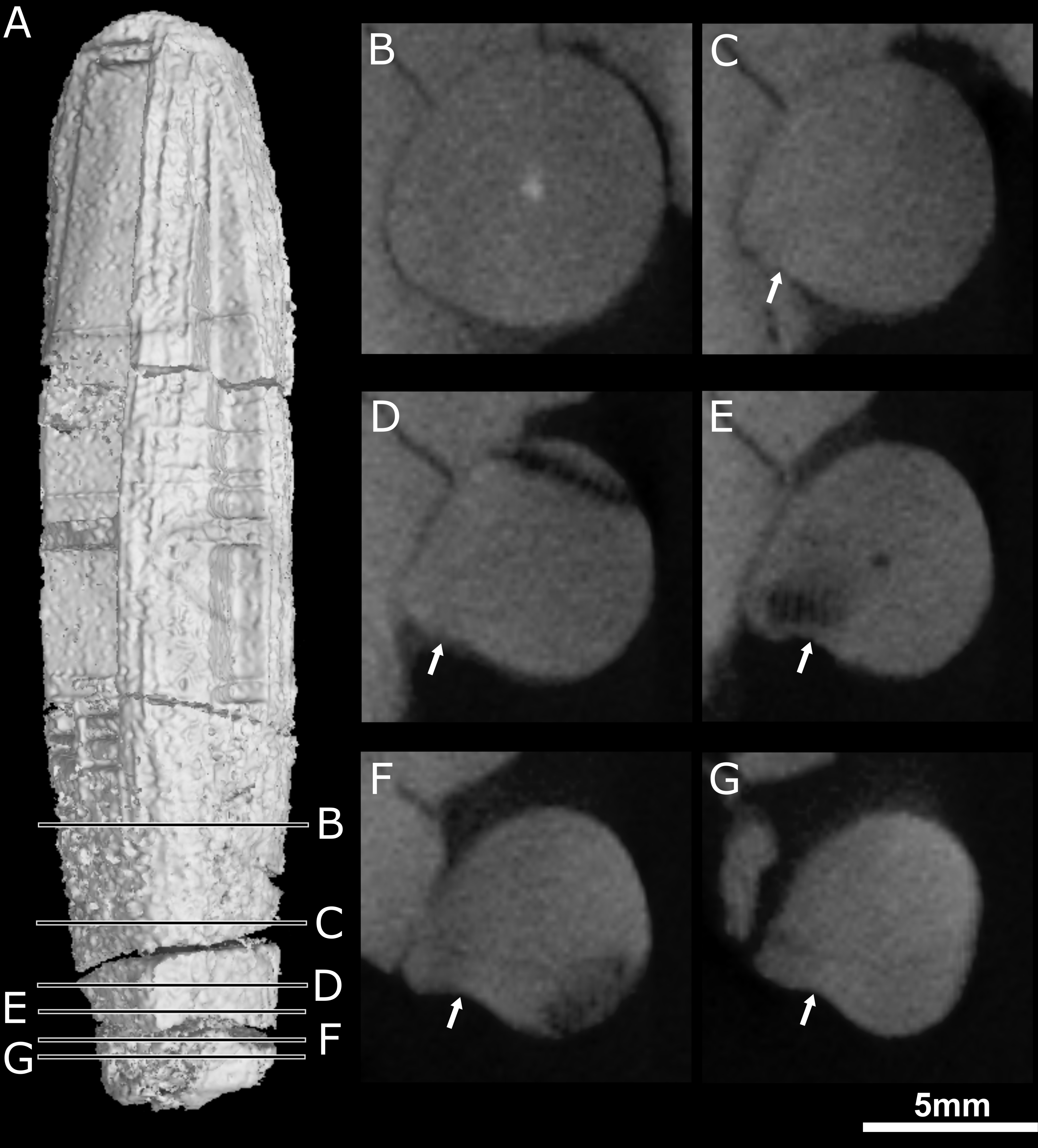
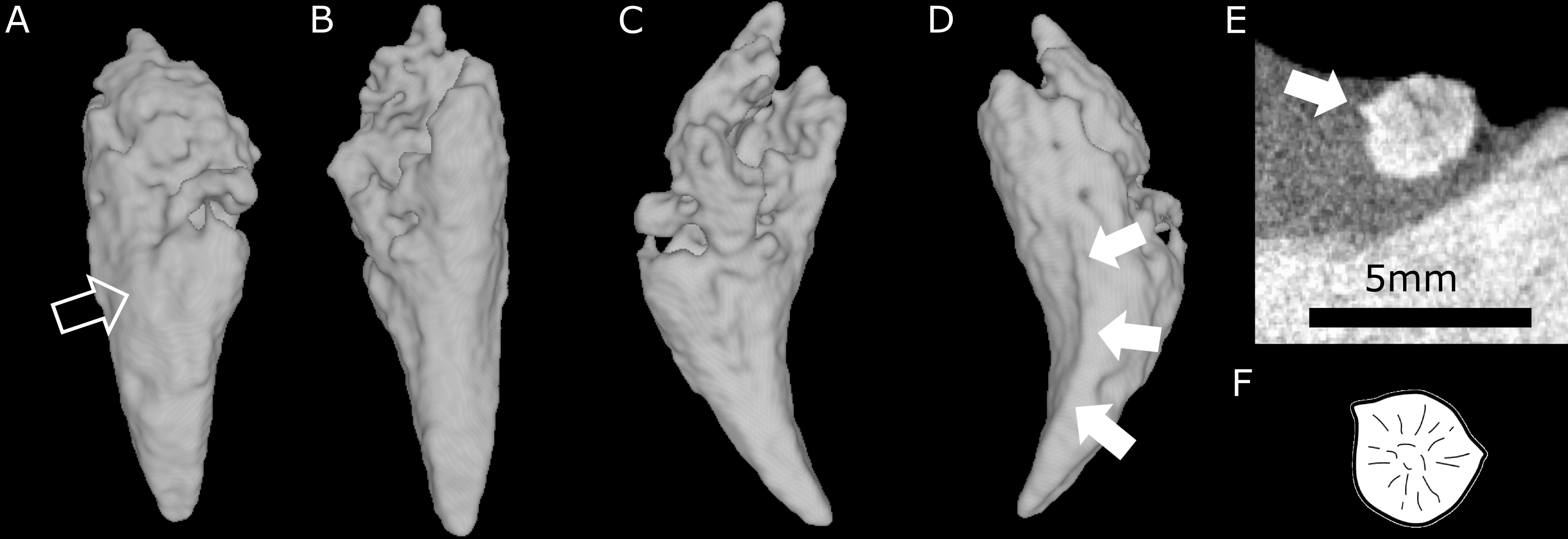
CT scans through the right canine of NHMUK 5696, the holotype of E. mirabilis (top), and of an incisor (possibly from the lower jaw) from BP/1/4009 (bottom)

In 2008, Mikhail Ivakhnenko included the Akidnognathidae (as the Euchambersiidae) as the sister group of the family Whaitsiidae in the superfamily Whaitsioidea. However, other researchers do not include the Akidnognathidae in the Whaitsioidea. Phylogenies by Huttenlocker and Sidor found that the Akidnognathidae was instead closest to the Chthonosauridae, with the two forming the sister group to the group containing the Whaitsioidea and the Baurioidea. Liu and Abdala performed a new phylogenetic analysis in 2022 for the description of E. liuyudongi. They found that the two species form a unified group within the Akidnognathidae, with the rest of the topology being similar to the one found by Huttenlocker and Sidor. The topology recovered by their analysis is shown below, with group labels following Huttenlocker and Sidor.

- Therocephalia
  - Lycosuchus
  - - Gorynychus
    - Scylacosauria
      - Scylacosauridae
      - Eutherocephalia
        - Scylacosuchus
        - - - Whaitsioidea
              - Ophidostoma
              - - - Hofmeyria
                  - - Ictidostoma
                    - Mirotenthes
                - Whaitsiidae
            - Baurioidea
          - - Chthonosauridae
            - Akidnognathidae
              - Annatherapsidus
              - - Shiguaignathus
                - - Jiufengia
                  - - USNM PAL 412421
                    - - Akidnognathus
                      - Moschorhininae
                        - - Olivierosuchus
                          - Promoschorhynchus
                        - - - Moschorhinus
                            - Cerdosuchoides
                          - - Euchambersia mirabilis
                            - Euchambersia liuyudongi

== Paleobiology ==
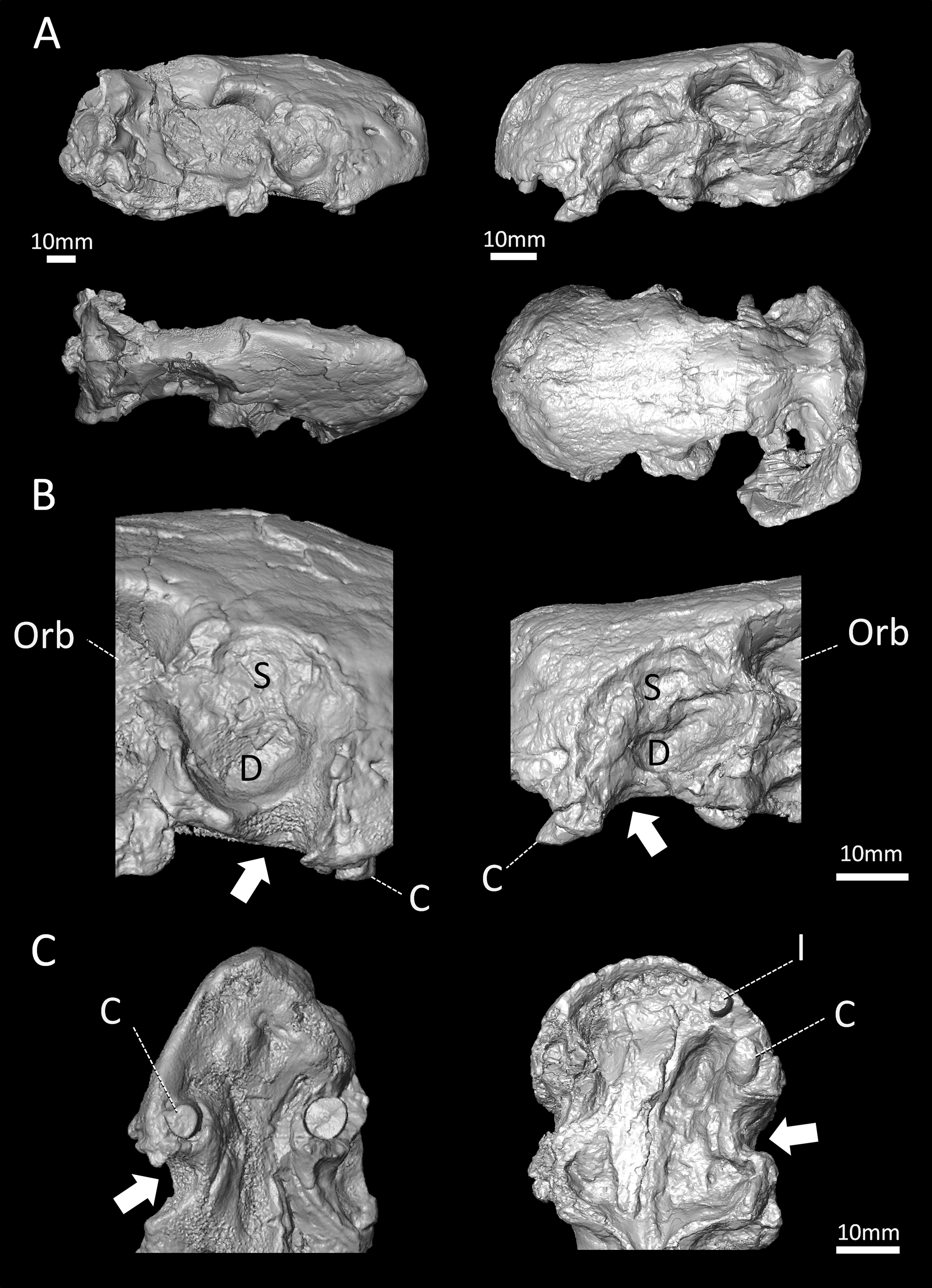
CT scans of the skulls belonging to the type (right) and second (left) specimens of E. mirabilis

=== Venom ===
The large maxillary fossae of Euchambersia have been continual subjects of debate regarding their function. However, most researchers agree that they held some sort of secretory gland. While Broom initially argued that the fossae may have contained the parotid salivary glands, this proposal was rejected by Boonstra and Jean-Pierre Lehman, who noted that the parotid glands tend to be placed behind the eye; they respectively suggested that the fossae held modified lacrimal glands and Harderian glands. However, the latter is also unlikely because Harderian glands are usually placed inside the eye socket. Franz Nopcsa suggested that the maxillary fossae housed venom glands (which may have been derived from lacrimal glands), with the ridged canines and the notches behind the canines allowing the venom to flow passively into the victim's bloodstream. This hypothesis was widely accepted throughout the 20th century and the characteristic morphology of Euchambersia was used to support possible venom-bearing adaptations among various other prehistoric animals, including the related therocephalians Megawhaitsia and Ichibengops.

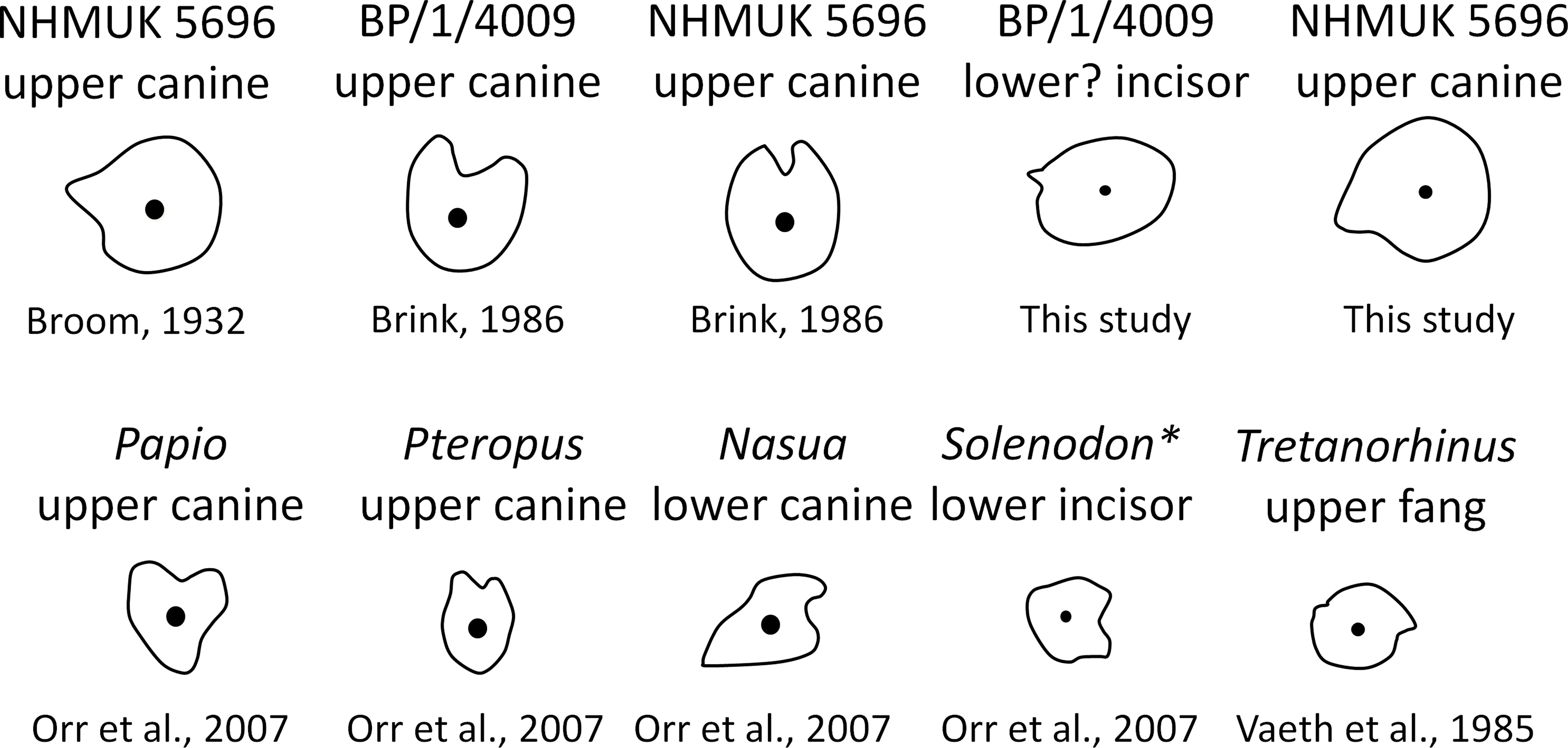
Cross-section of the canine of E. mirabilis as originally illustrated by Broom (top left), with the subsequent "grooved" reconstruction (top centre) and new reconstruction based on CT scans (top right), compared to those of other mammals (bottom)

Much of this acceptance has been based on the erroneous assumption that the canines are grooved instead of ridged; grooved canines in Euchambersia would parallel the fangs of various venomous snakes as well as the venom-delivering incisors of the living solenodons. This interpretation, which has consistently appeared in literature published after 1986, was determined by Julien Benoit to be the result of the propagation of Broom's overly reconstructed diagram of the skull, without the context of the actual specimens. He thus considered it necessary to re-evaluate the hypothesis of a venomous bite in Euchambersia. Additionally, Benoit argued that grooved and ridged canines are not necessarily associated with venomous animals either, as shown by their presence in hippopotami, muntjacs, and baboons, in which they play a role in grooming or sharpening the teeth; in the latter two, ridged canines are also accompanied by a distinct fossa in front of the eye, which is entirely unconnected with venom. Furthermore, grooved and ridged teeth in non-venomous snakes are used to reduce suctional drag when capturing slippery prey like fish or invertebrates.

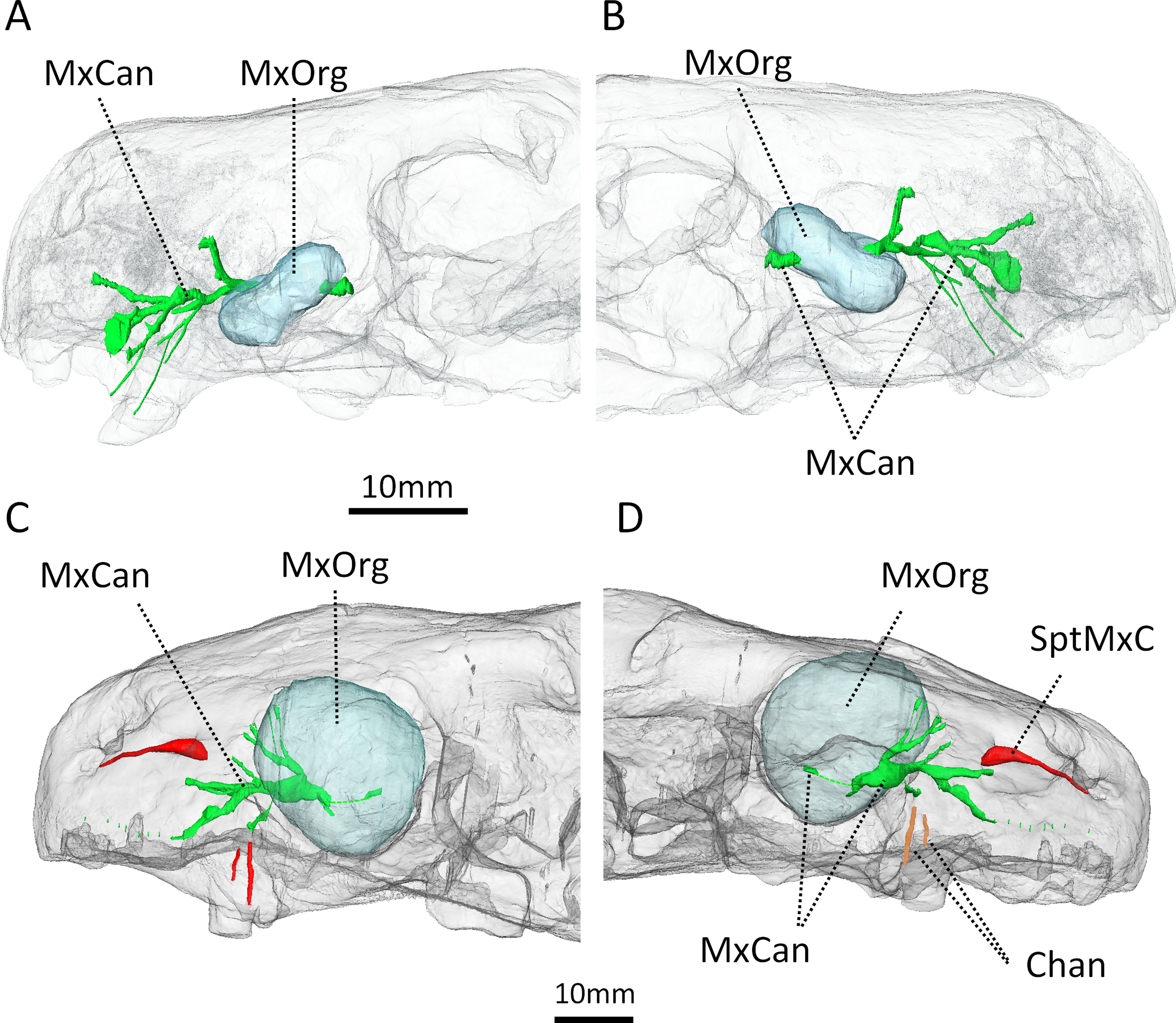
Hypothetical reconstruction of the venom gland that filled the maxillary fossa (blue), with maxillary canals shown (green), in the second (A-B) and type (C-D) specimens of E. mirabilis

CT scanning of the known specimens of Euchambersia by Benoit and colleagues was subsequently used to provide more concrete support in favour of the venom hypothesis. The canals leading into and from the maxillary fossae, as revealed by the scans, would primarily have supported the trigeminal nerve as well as blood vessels. However, the fact that the canals also directly lead to the root of the canines would suggest that they had a secondary role in venom delivery. In all, Euchambersia seems to have had a venom gland (housed in the maxillary fossae), a delivery mechanism of the venom (the maxillary canals), and an instrument by which a wound for venom delivery can be inflicted (the ridged canines), which satisfy the criteria of a venomous animal as defined by Wolfgang Bücherl. Benoit et al. noted that this does not conclusively demonstrate that Euchambersia was actually venomous, especially given the previously stated objections. Additionally, there are no living animals with a delivery system analogous to the proposed system for Euchambersia (most deliver venom through the lower jaw, while snakes have specialized ducts.

An alternate hypothesis suggested by Benoit et al. involves some kind of sensory organ occupying the maxillary fossa. Uniquely among therapsids, the canal within the maxilla is exposed on the back side of the maxillary fossa, which implies that the canal, carrying the trigeminal nerve, would probably have extended across the fossa, outside of the outline of the skull. Benoit et al. hypothesized that the fossa may have supported a specialized sensory organ analogous to the pit organ of pit vipers and some other snakes, or alternatively a ganglion of nerve cells. It is also possible that this organ functioned as a replacement for the parietal eye in Euchambersia, like the pit organ does in pit vipers. However, such an expanded sensory organ would be unprecedented among tetrapods, and the few other therocephalians that also lack a parietal eye do not have a maxillary fossa either. Thus, Benoit et al. considered the venom hypothesis as being more plausible.

However, in the well-preserved specimen of the second species, E. liuyudongi, neither the snout nor the orbit showed signs of the venomous gland. Only the preorbital (scent) glands are found, supporting the "scent gland hypothesis," although CT scans are required for more knowledge regarding the new species' dentition and skull.

== Paleoecology ==
=== South Africa ===
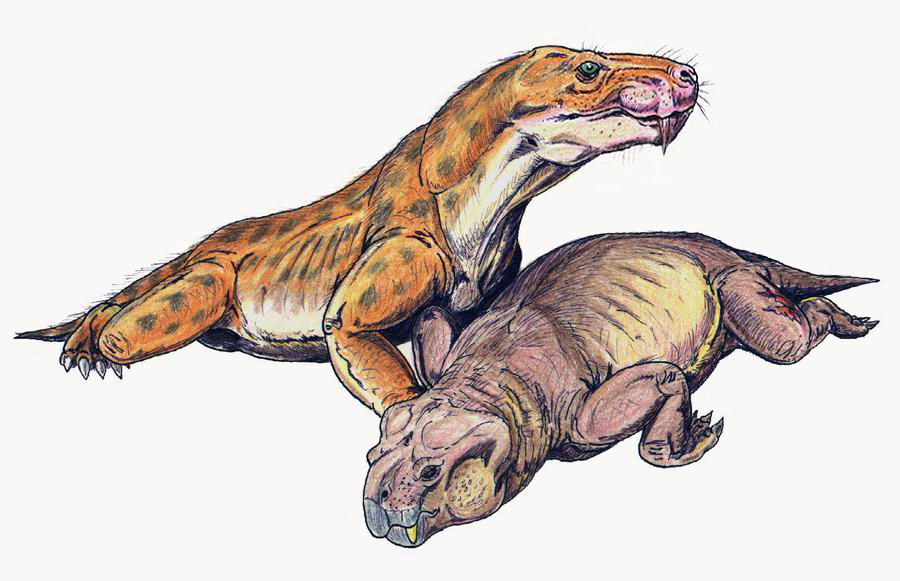
Restoration of E. mirabilis with dicynodont prey

The Cistecephalus Assemblage Zone, from where E. mirabilis is known, represents a floodplain that was covered in many small, relatively straight streams. The water level in these streams was probably seasonally dependent. Judging from pollen preserved in the Cistecephalus AZ, the pollen taxon Pityosporites (which probably originated from a plant similar to Glossopteris) was very common, forming some 80% to 90% of the pollen discovered (although the prevalent sediments would not have been ideal for pollen preservation).

In the Cistecephalus AZ, other co-occurring therocephalians included Hofmeyria, Homodontosaurus, Ictidostoma, Ictidosuchoides, Ictidosuchops, Macroscelesaurus, Polycynodon, and Proalopecopsis. More numerous, however, were the gorgonopsians, which included Aelurognathus, Aelurosaurus, Aloposaurus, Arctognathus, Arctops, Cerdorhinus, Clelandina, Cyonosaurus, Dinogorgon, Gorgonops, Lycaenops, Leontocephalus, Pardocephalus, Prorubidgea, Rubidgea, Scylacops, Scymnognathus, and Sycosaurus.

By far the most abundant herbivore was the dicynodont Diictodon, with over 1900 known specimens from the Cistecephalus AZ. Other dicynodonts included Aulacephalodon, Cistecephalus, Dicynodon, Dicynodontoides, Digalodon, Dinanomodon, Emydops, Endothiodon, Kingoria, Kitchinganomodon, Oudenodon, Palemydops, Pelanomodon, Pristerodon, and Rhachiocephalus. The biarmosuchians Lemurosaurus, Lycaenodon, Paraburnetia, and Rubidgina were also present, along with the cynodonts Cynosaurus and Procynosuchus. Non-synapsids included the archosauromorph Younginia; the parareptilians Anthodon, Milleretta, Nanoparia, Owenetta, and Pareiasaurus; and the temnospondyl Rhinesuchus.

=== China ===
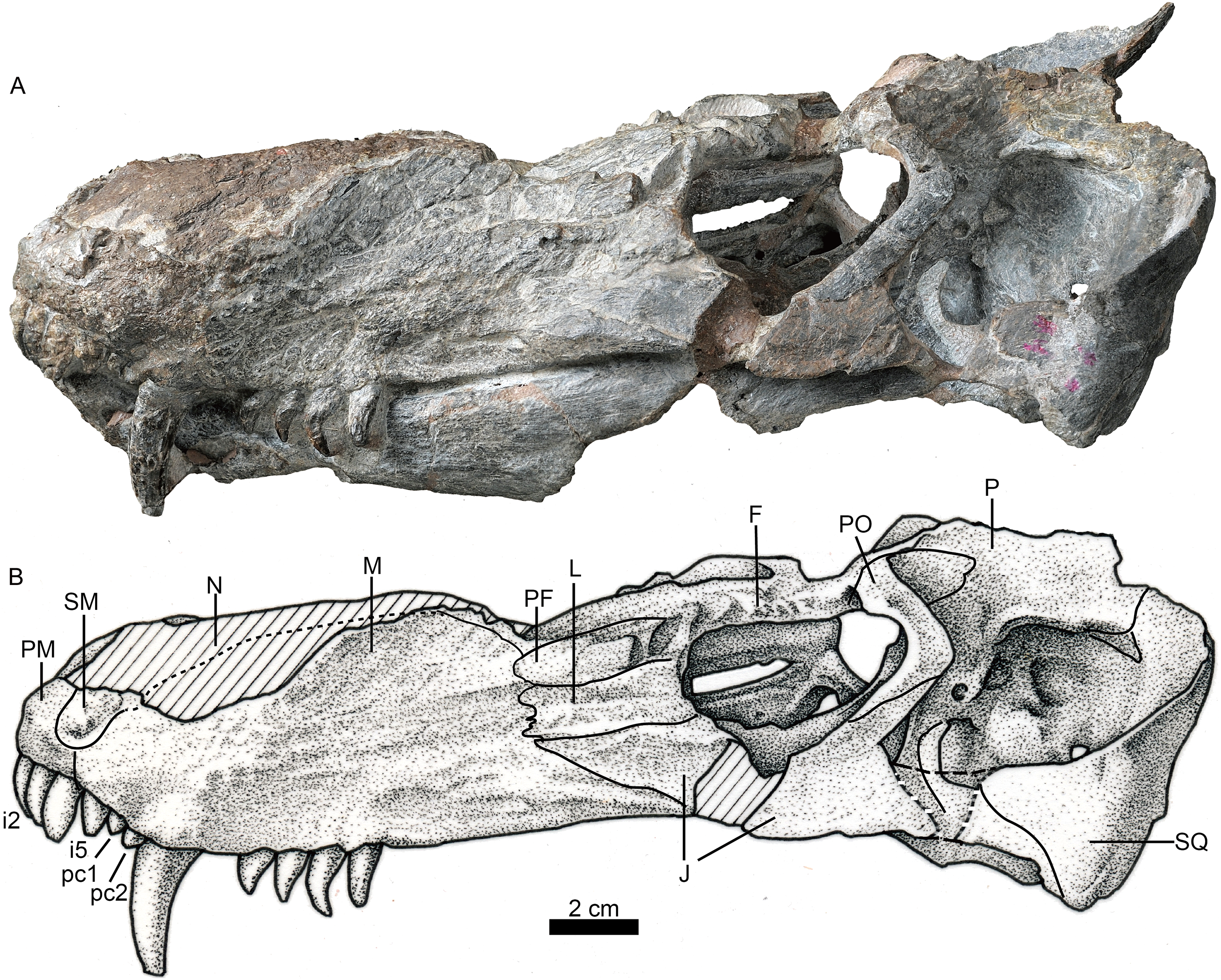
The less specialized Jiufengia was geographically close but temporally younger than E. liuyudongi

The Naobaogou Formation, from which E. liuyudongi is known, is part of a series of Late Permian river and lake deposits in Inner Mongolia, which were deposited by braided rivers, floodplains, and floodplain lakes. Therocephalians had been reported from the Naobaogou Formation as early as 1989, but these fossils were later lost. Subsequently, Liu and Abdala confirmed their presence in the formation by describing two other akidnognathids besides E. liuyudongi, Shiguaignathus and Jiufengia, as well as Caodeyao, a non-akidnognathid therocephalian closely related to the Russian Purlovia. Unlike the more specialized E. liuyudongi, Liu and Abdala's 2022 phylogenetic analysis found Shiguaignathus and Jiufengia to be less specialized (basal) members of Akidnognathinae, while simultaneously originating from the younger member III of the formation. Thus, E. liuyudongi provides evidence of both a therocephalian genus existing in both southern and north Pangaea and of a specialized akidnognathid genus in northern Pangaea.

Like the Cistecephalus AZ and other Permian palaeoenvironments, dicynodonts were the most commonly preserved animal of the Naobaogou Formation. Daqingshanodon was described in 1989. Subsequently-discovered specimens consist of at least seven different types that may belong to separate species, with one described as Turfanodon jiufengensis, two related to Daqingshanodon, and three or four related to Jimusaria. Non-synapsids included the captorhinid Gansurhinus; the parareptilian Elginia wuyongae; and the chroniosuchian Laosuchus hun.

== See also ==
- List of therapsids
