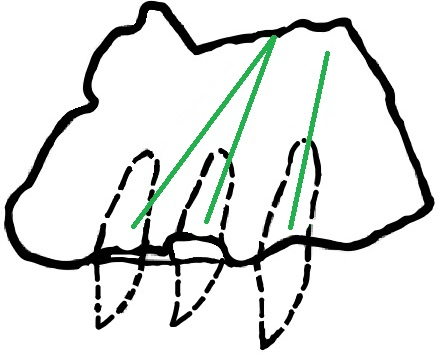
- Illustration of the holotype maxilla showing possible venom ducts

Scientific classification
- Kingdom: Animalia
- Phylum: Chordata
- Clade: Synapsida
- Clade: Therapsida
- Clade: †Therocephalia
- Family: †Whaitsiidae
- Genus: †Megawhaitsia; Ivakhnenko, 2008

Type species
- †Megawhaitsia patrichae Ivakhnenko, 2008

= Megawhaitsia =

Megawhaitsia Temporal range: Changhsingian

Extinct genus of large therapsids from the Late Permian in East Russia

Megawhaitsia is an extinct genus of large therocephalian therapsids who lived during the Late Permian (Changhsingian) in what is now Eastern Europe. The only known species is M. patrichae, described in 2008 from several fossils discovered in various oblasts of European Russia. The fossils are representative of a large animal whose skull size is estimated to be 40–50 cm (16–20 in) long.

The most notable feature of Megawhaitsia is that it has a maxilla with canals directly connected to the tooth root of the canines. Based on the characteristics present in the related genus Euchambersia, Russian paleontologist Mikhail Ivakhnenko raises the possibility that the animal may have had a venom gland. If it is true, then it would then be one of the oldest tetrapods known to have this attribute. Subsequent studies have challenged this proposition.

The imposing size of Megawhaitsia and its position as an apex predator could be linked to the disappearance or absence of large gorgonopsians at the end of the Late Permian in certain regions of present-day European Russia. Megawhaitsia could thus have occupied the ecological niches previously occupied by the gorgonopsians.

== Discovery and naming ==
The holotype specimen of Megawhaitsia was discovered in the mid-1950s during excavations carried out in the locality of Vyazniki-2, located in Vladimir Oblast, in European Russia, before being cataloged as PIN 1100/101. This site is dated to the Changhsingian stage of the Late Permian. It had originally been incorrectly recorded as the jawbone of a gorgonopsian similar to Inostrancevia. Given the low presence of gorgonopsians during the Late Permian in Russia, the fossil was reassigned to a large therocephalian in a work published in 1997, without however receiving a binomial name. In 2001, Mikhail Feodosievich Ivakhnenko attributed two additional fossil remains to the still unnamed taxon. The first is a partial maxillary bone, cataloged PIN 1538/39, discovered in the locality of Purly, in the Nizhny Novgorod Oblast. The second is the right part of an incomplete mandible, cataloged PIN 4417/101, discovered in the locality of Shabarshata, in the Kirov Oblast.

Ivakhnenko published in 2008 a formal description of the new taxa, based on the specimens PIN 1100/101 and PIN 1538/39, describing it as the first Late Permian whaitsiid from Eastern Europe. Subsequently, the scope of whaitsiids was expanded to include discoveries made earlier in the Permian deposits of the same Russian regions, including Moschowhaitsia and Viatkosuchus, described in 1963 and 1995 respectively. The genus name Megawhaitsia comes from the Ancient Greek μέγας (megas, "great"), combined with the name of another therocephalian genus, Whaitsia (name witch is today synonymous with Theriognathus). The specific epithet patrichae honors the Australian paleontologist Patricia Vickers-Rich.

== Description ==
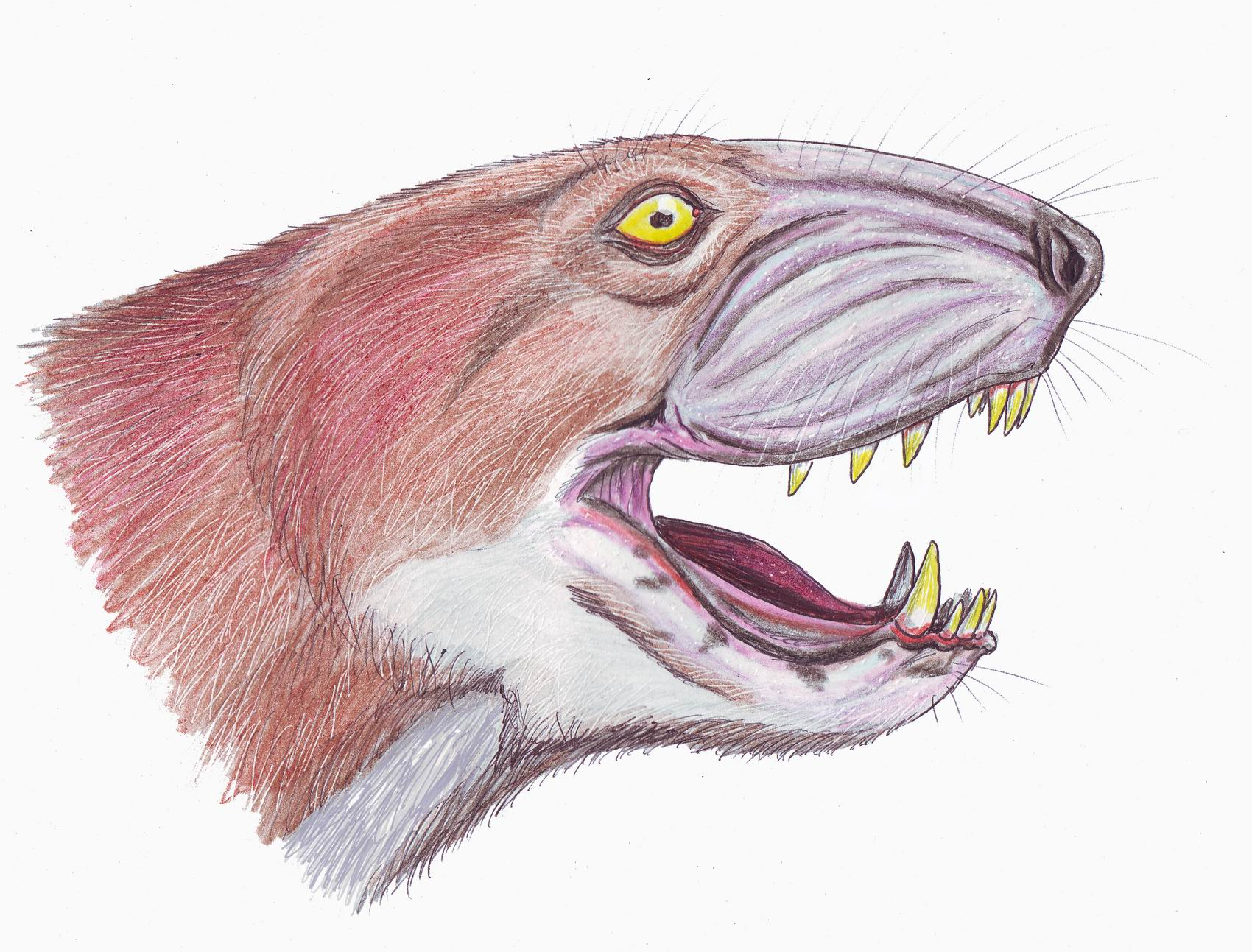
Restoration of the head

The known fossils of Megawhaitsia are very incomplete, thus preventing any complete reconstruction of the animal's anatomy. However, the structure of the two known maxillary bones proves that it is a therocephalian.

The animals' maxillary bone was massive with the largest preserved fragment measuring about 10 cm (3.9 in) in length. Based on the proportions of the fuller skulls of the smaller South African representatives of the group, the total length of the animal's skull is estimated to be between 40–50 cm (16–20 in), which would make Megawhaitsia the largest therocephalian known to date. On the lower edge of the maxilla there is a large space that can accommodate the lower canine. Behind are the sockets of three large upper canines, the two anterior being somewhat larger. The roots of the teeth are deep, all three having a deep alveolar fossa. The partial mandible attributed to Megawhaitsia has the socket of a very large canine but lacks those of the cheek teeth.

A feature of the maxillary bone is that it has three channels which start in the region of the lacrimo-nasal duct, pass along the roots of the teeth and open near the sockets of each of the canines. By analogy with the hypotheses on the venomousness of another genus of therocephalians, Euchambersia, Ivakhnenko interprets these canals as a possible proof of the presence of poisonous glands in Megawhaitsia, which would be used to slaughter large prey. However, since the venomousness of Euchambersia has been questioned in a study published in 2017, in particular on the basis of the comparison with various modern venomous animals, the authors of the 2017 study suggest other explanations of the presence of these maxillary canals might be possible.

== Classification ==
During the second half of the 20th century, the fossil maxillary bones of Megawhaitsia were considered to belong to a gorgonopsid similar or identical to the genus Inostrancevia. In 1997, the fossils were reassigned to an undetermined therocephalian in the family Whaitsiidae, then to the Moschorhinidae family in 2001. In the 2008 article of Ivakhnenko, Megawhaitsia is included again in the family Whaitsiidae, within the superfamily Whaitsioidea. At that time, the Whaitsioidea taxon included the Euchambersiidae and the Whaitsiidae as sister-groups, due to their similar appearance. A study published less than a year later by Adam Huttenlocker estimated that the families Euchambersiidae, Moschorhinidae and Annatherapsididae represented junior synonyms of Akidnognathidae, considered the sister-group of Whaitsiidae. It was in 2016 that Huttenlocker and Christian Sidor concluded that the Akidnognathidae are in fact close to the Chthonosauridae, the two forming the sister-group of a clade containing the Whaitsioidea and the Baurioidea. The superfamily Whaitsioidea remains recognized as a valid taxa, although it now only contains whaitsiids and a few related genera.

== Paleobiology ==
In comparison to South African therocephalians, Megawhaitsia had a noticeably larger size corresponding to a specialized carnivorous predator niche. It fed on fairly large prey, notably dicynodonts, which were numerous in Russian regions of Europe during the Upper Permian. The possible presence of venom glands in Megawhaitsia would be consistent with the warm-blooded dicynodont hypothesis, as venom offers a significant advantage especially in hunting active warm-blooded prey.

One of the types of large coprolites found in the Vyazniki locality is associated with Megawhaitsia or closely related whaitsiids such as Moschowhaitsia. It reveals a high content of bony material, including bones bearing traces of a rich network of blood vessels, probably belonging to dicynodonts, indicating a predator that occupied the top position in the trophic chain. Additionally, remains of fish scales and material interpreted as ganoine have been found in morphotype A coprolites, as well as fur-like structures. These are interpreted as the oldest fossil coat remains known to date, although it remains unclear whether they belong to prey or were swallowed by a predator as a result of grooming.

== Paleoecology ==
The locality of Viazniki-2, where the holotype of Megawhaitsia was discovered, contains numerous fossils of tetrapods dating from the Wuchiapingian, including the temnospondyl Dvinosaurus, as well as non-amniote reptiliomorphs, including the seymouriamorph Karpinskiosaurus and numerous chroniosuchians. Sauropsids present include pareiasaurs such as Obirkovia and archosauriforms of the family Proterosuchidae, such as Archosaurus. The latter would also have been one of the main predators of the area. Other therapsids are present in the locality, such as an indeterminate dicynodont and even other therocephalians, including Annatherapsidus, Malasaurus and Moschowhaitsia.

Researchers speculate that due to their increased size, East European whaitsiids occupied the ecological niche of the large gorgonopsians, which at that time had disappeared from Eastern Europe, possibly due to a climate cooling.

== See also ==
- Euchambersia
- Ichibengops
