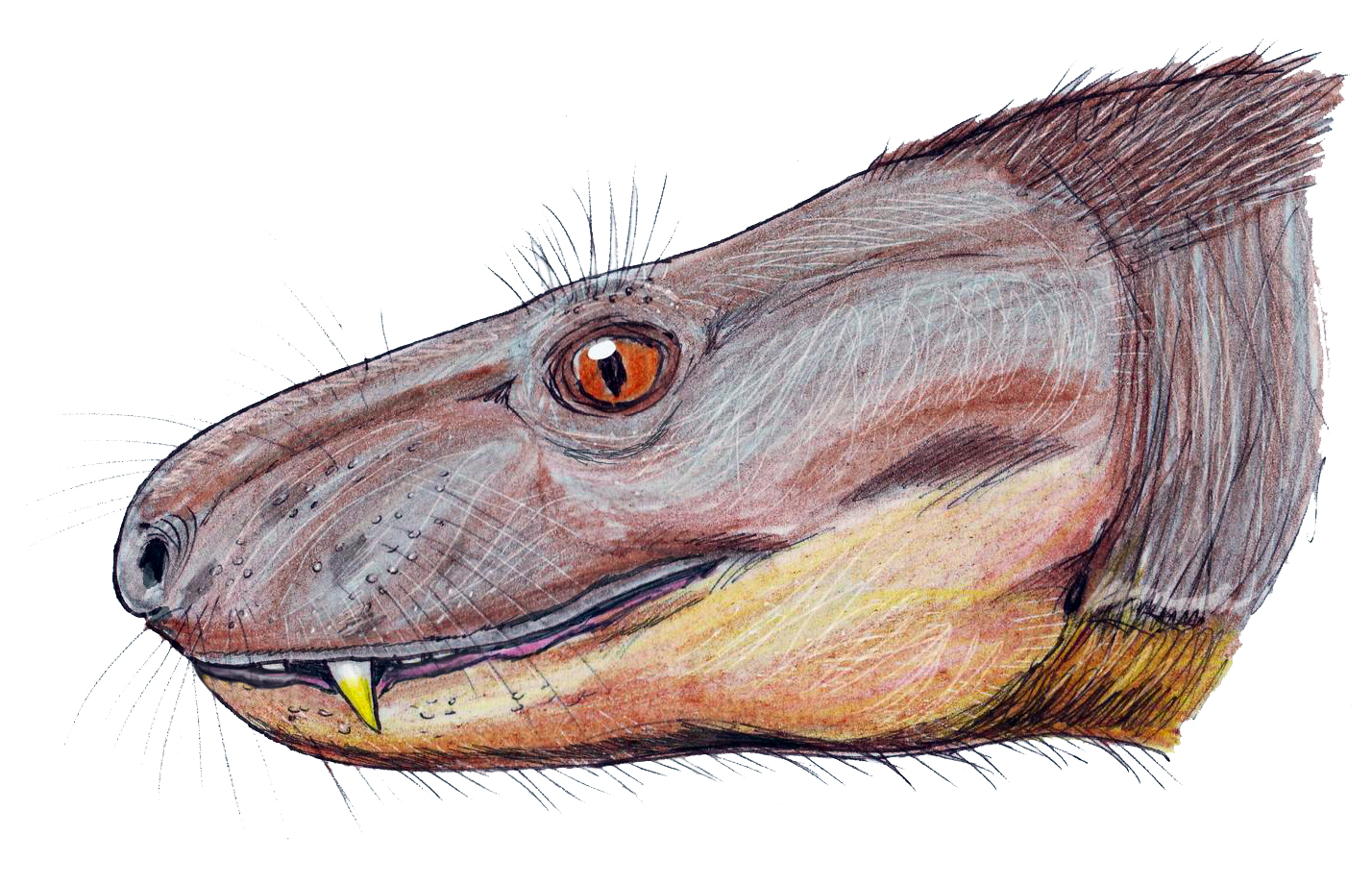
- Life restoration of Moschowhaitsia vjuschkovi

Scientific classification
- Kingdom: Animalia
- Phylum: Chordata
- Clade: Synapsida
- Clade: Therapsida
- Clade: †Therocephalia
- Family: †Whaitsiidae
- Genus: †Moschowhaitsia; Tatarinov, 1963

Type species
- †Moschowhaitsia vjuschkovi Tatarinov, 1963

Other species
- †M. lidaqingi Liu & Abdala, 2023

= Moschowhaitsia =

Moschowhaitsia Temporal range: Late Permian (Wuchiapingian to Changhsingian) 255.2–251.9 Ma

Extinct genus of therapsid from the late Permian of Eurasia

Moschowhaitsia is an extinct genus of therocephalian therapsids from the Late Permian (Lopingian) of Russia and China. The type species, Moschowhaitsia vjuschkovi, was discovered in the Changxingian-aged Archosaurus Assemblage Zone of Russia and named in 1963 by Russian palaeontologist Leonid Petrovich Tatarinov. A second species was discovered in Jingtai County of Gansu, China in 2020 and named as M. lidaqingi in 2023 by Jun Liu and Fernando Abdala, the first whaitsiid therocephalian to be discovered in China. It was among the larger carnivores in the faunal assemblages it occurred in, with a skull-length of up to 25 centimetres (9.8 in) in M. vjuschkovi and an even larger estimated 35 centimetres (14 in) for M. lidaqingi, one of the largest therocephalian skulls reported. The genus name Moschowhaitsia alludes to two other therocephalians, Moschorhinus and Whaitsia (a junior synonym of Theriognathus), due to the structure of its palate combining physical features of both these genera.

== Classification and taxonomy ==
Moschowhaitsia is a member of the derived therocephalian clade Whaitsiidae, ranked as a family under traditional Linnaean taxonomy. Tatarinov initially assigned Moschowhaitsia to its own monotypic subfamily of whaitsiids, Moschowhaitsiinae, on the basis that it appeared to him as an intermediate form bridging the anatomy of two other subfamilies of whaitsiids, Whaitsiinae and Moschorhininae. Some later researchers, including Tatarinov himself, would later elevate Moschowhaitsia to family level distinction (Moschowhaitsiidae), along with other subtaxa of whaitsiids, although nonetheless retaining the existing close taxonomic relationships under the superfamily Whaitsioidea.

However, later research of therocephalian evolution using cladistics regardless of taxonomic ranking have found that many of the various whaitsiids/whaitsioids are in fact only distantly related to each other, with many belonging to the earlier-diverging clade Akidnognathidae instead (including members of Moschorhininae). As a clade, Whaitsiidae has been restricted to therocephalians closest to Theriognathus (the senior synonym of Whaitsia). As such, Moschowhaitsia is a member of Whaitsiidae as cladistically defined, and is one of the clade's only representatives from Laurasia.

A cladogram depicting the relationships of both M. vjuschkovi and M. lidaqingi is shown below, reproduced from Liu & Abdala (2023) and simplified to show the relationships of whaitsioid therocephalians:

- Eutherocephalia
  - Scylacosuchus
  - - Akidnognathidae
    - - Nanictidops
      - - Perplexisaurus
        - - - Purlovia
            - Caodeyao
          - - Whaitsioidea
              - Ophidostoma
              - - - Hofmeyria
                  - - Mirotenthes
                    - Ictidostoma
                - Whaitsiidae
                  - Ictidochampsa
                  - - Microwhaitsia
                    - - Viatkosuchus
                      - Theriognathus
                      - Moschowhaitsia vjuschkovi
                      - Moschowhaitsia lidaqingi
                      - - Ichibengops
                        - Chthonosaurus
            - Baurioidea

The strict-consensus tree shown above did not recover M. vjuschkovi and M. lidaqingi as each other's sister taxa (found as such in only six of the 30 most parsimonious (i.e. shortest) trees). However, Liu and Abadala (2023) nonetheless assigned M. lidaqingi to Moschognathus as both species show more similarities to each other in morphology than either does to other whaitsiids. Such traits include the number of incisors and postcanine teeth, rugose bone on the front edge of the orbit, and a notch in the maxilla in front of the canine.

== See also ==
- List of therapsids
