= Dalongkoua =

Scientific classification
- Domain: Eukaryota
- Kingdom: Animalia
- Phylum: Chordata
- Clade: Synapsida
- Clade: Therapsida
- Clade: †Therocephalia
- Family: †Whaitsiidae
- Genus: †Dalongkoua; Liu and Abdala, 2017
- Species: †D. fuae

Binomial name
- †Dalongkoua fuae Liu and Abdala, 2017

Extinct genus of therapsid from late Permian China

Dalongkoua fuae is a Chinese whaitsiid therocephalian of the Late Permian.
