= Ictidochampsa =

Ictidochampsa Temporal range: Wuchiapingian

Scientific classification
- Domain: Eukaryota
- Kingdom: Animalia
- Phylum: Chordata
- Clade: Synapsida
- Clade: Therapsida
- Clade: †Therocephalia
- Family: †Whaitsiidae
- Genus: †Ictidochampsa; Broom, 1948

Type species
- †Ictidochampsa platyceps Broom, 1948

Extinct genus of therapsids from the Late Permian of South Africa

Ictidochampsa is an extinct genus of therocephalian therapsids from the Late Permian of South Africa. The type species Ictidochampsa platyceps was named by South African paleontologist Robert Broom in 1948 from the Dicynodon Assemblage Zone.
