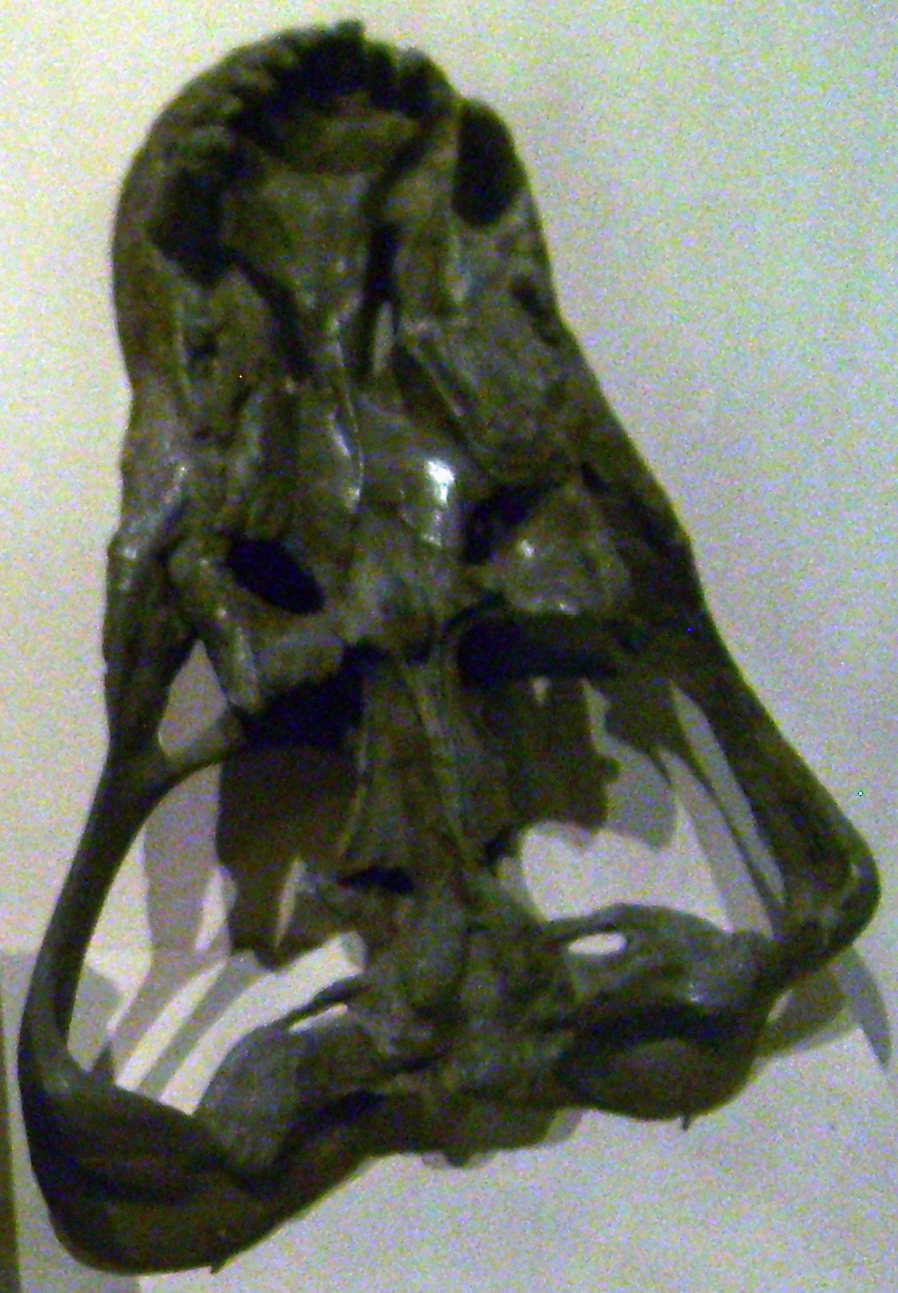
- Theriognathus laticeps skull at the Museum für Naturkunde, Berlin

Scientific classification
- Kingdom: Animalia
- Phylum: Chordata
- Clade: Synapsida
- Clade: Therapsida
- Clade: †Therocephalia
- Superfamily: †Whaitsioidea
- Family: †Whaitsiidae; Haughton, 1918

Genera
- Dalongkoua; Ictidochampsa; Megawhaitsia?; Microwhaitsia; Moschowhaitsia; Theriognathus; Viatkosuchus

= Whaitsiidae =

Whaitsiidae Temporal range: Middle—Late Permian, 260–252 Ma Suspected Capitanian origin

Extinct family of therapsids

Whaitsiidae is an extinct family of therocephalian therapsids. Whaitsiids were part of the superfamily Whaitsioidea, which were the most diverse clade of therocephalians during the Late Permian. However, the superfamily would go extinct during the end-Permian mass extinction.

== Description ==
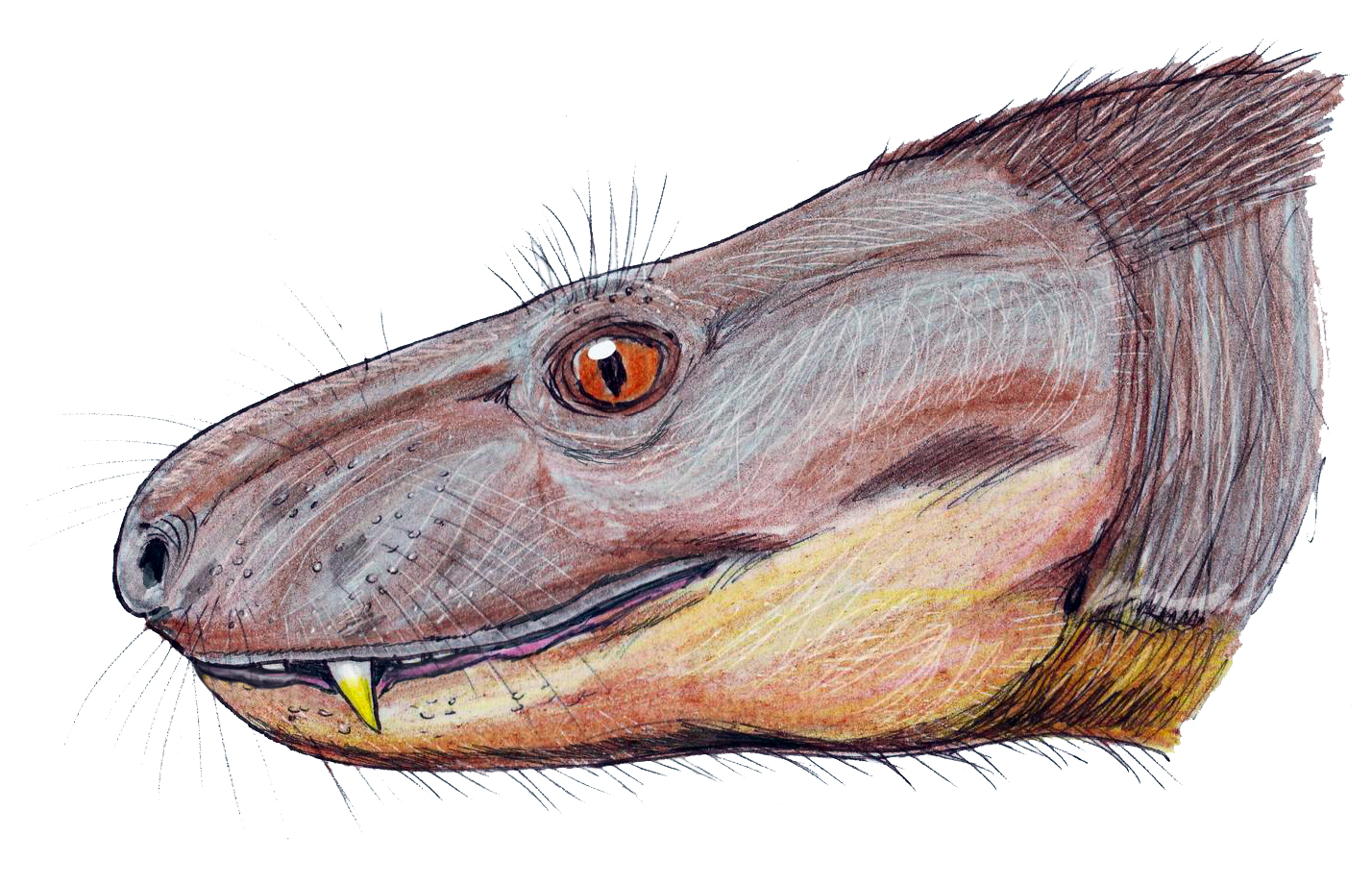
Restoration of Moschowhaitsia vjuschkovi

Whaitsiids and their closest relatives (hofmeyriids and Ophidostoma) are grouped together in the clade Whaitsioidea. Some of their distinctive traits include a reduced number of postcanine teeth, a broad skull, and a boomerang-shaped lower jaw. At the front, the lower jaws have a loose rather than solid connection at the symphysis (chin), while at their rear the jaw joint is streptostylic. This would have given whaitsioids an unusually wide and flexible gape among therapsids, not unlike snakes.

The sides of the snout are concave, while the suborbital and postorbital bars are thick, allowing the orbits (eye sockets) to point more forwards than in other therocephalians. A few whaitsiids were large by therocephalian standards, though they were still smaller than most gorgonopsians.

== Classification ==
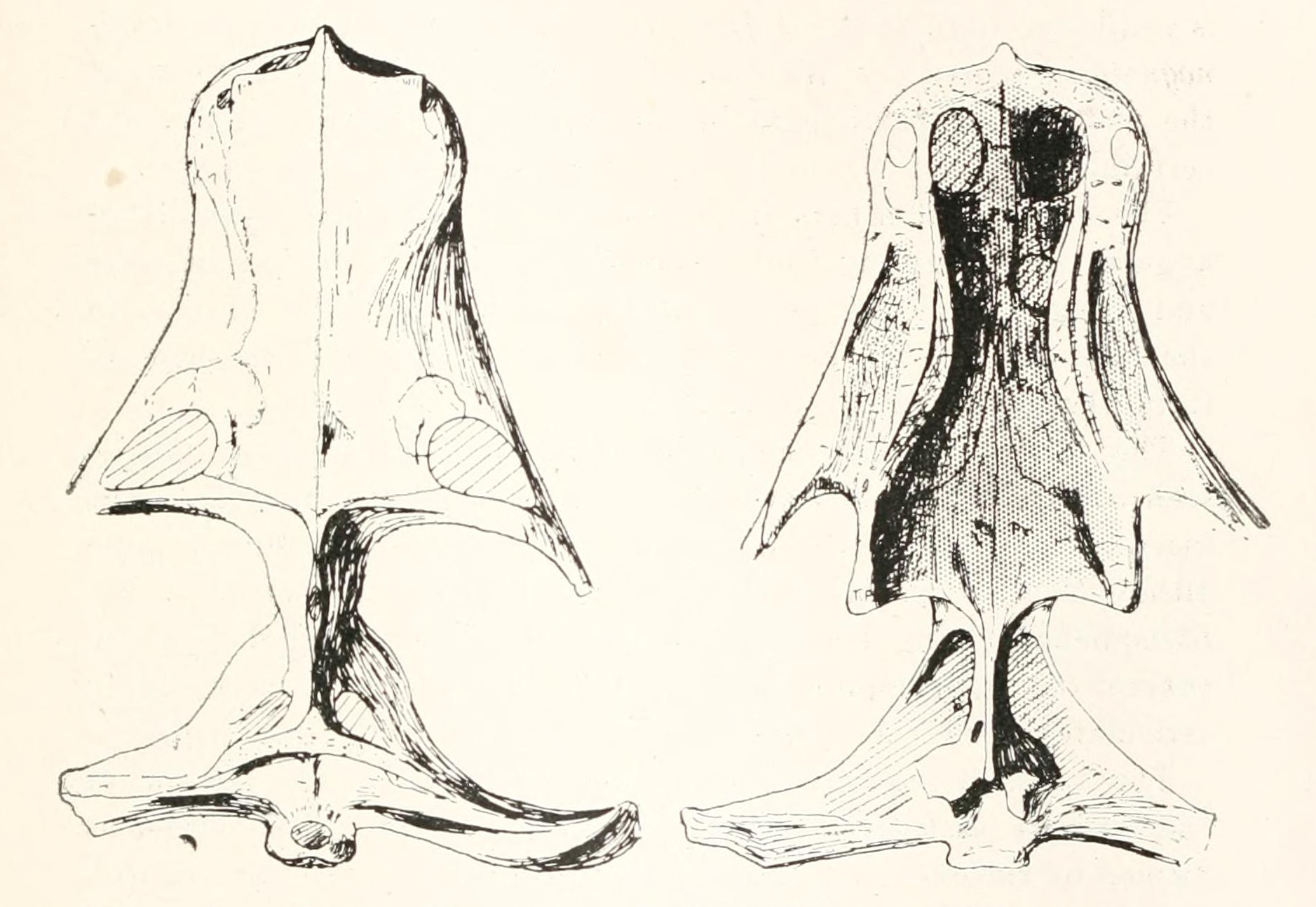
A 1918 illustration of the skull of Whaitsia platyceps, now classified as Theriognathus major

Whaitsiidae is named after Whaitsia, a junior synonym (defunct later name) for Therioganthus. Theriognathus remains the best-described member of the family. Whaitsioids are one of three major groups in the clade Eutherocephalia, alongside Akidnognathidae and Baurioidea. Historically, many therocephalians have been classified as "whaitsiids" or "whaitsioids" at some point, though in modern use Whaitsiidae is a smaller and more narrowly-defined family.

A few studies have argued that cynodonts (and consequently mammals) are descended from whaitsiid therocephalians, based on cynodont-like features in the skull of Theriognathus. Other studies strongly disagree, arguing that therocephalians and cynodonts are separate sister clades. A 2024 analysis of therapsid snout structures suggests that cynodonts may still be descended from eutherocephalians, just not whaitsiids in particular.
