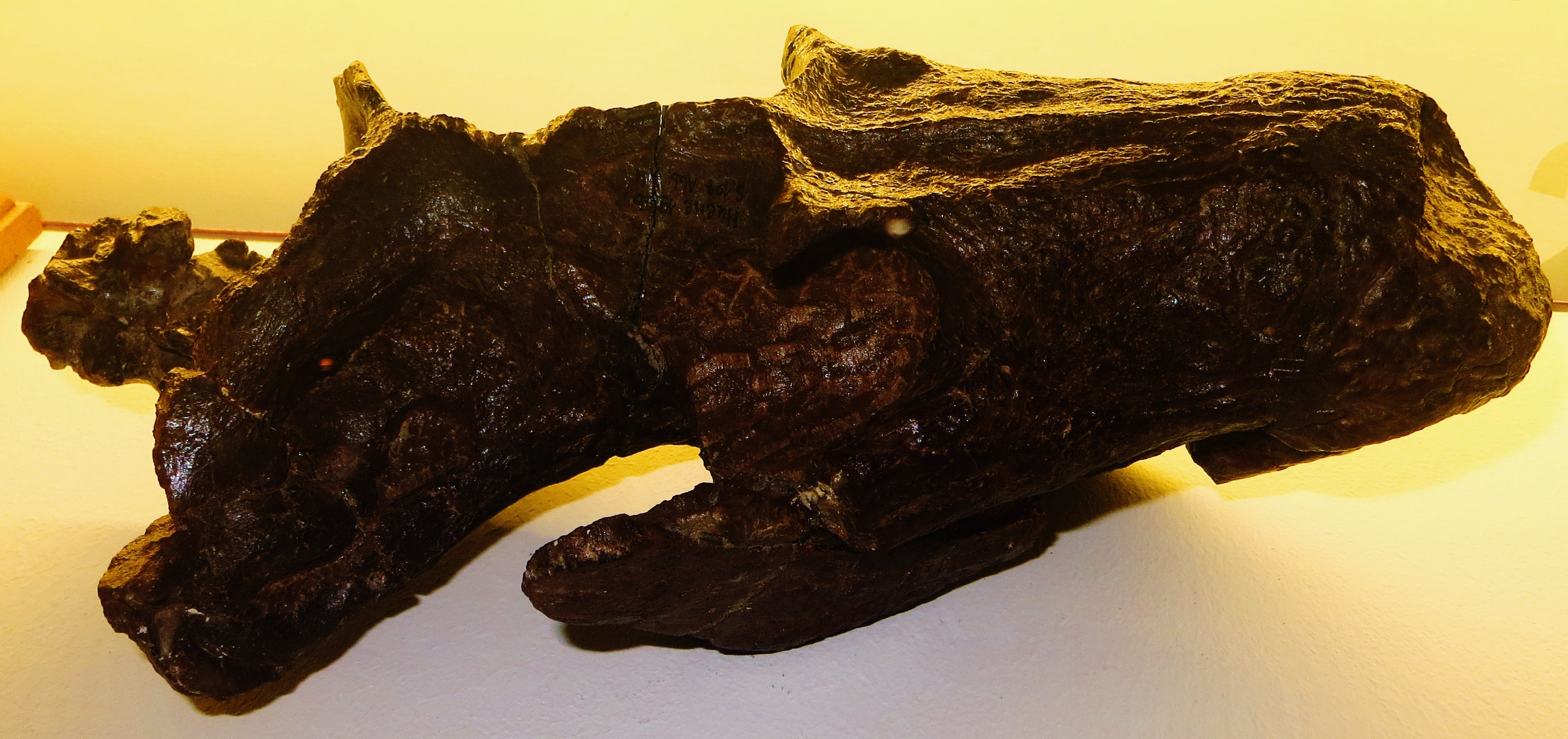
- T. microps Fossil

Scientific classification
- Kingdom: Animalia
- Phylum: Chordata
- Clade: Synapsida
- Clade: Therapsida
- Clade: †Therocephalia
- Family: †Whaitsiidae
- Genus: †Theriognathus; Owen, 1876

Type species
- Theriognathus microps Owen, 1876

Synonyms
- Alopecopsis Broom, 1920; Aneugomphius Broom and Robinson, 1949; Hyenosaurus Broom, 1935; Notaelurops Broom, 1936; Notosollasia Broom, 1925; Whaitsia Haughton, 1918

= Theriognathus =

Theriognathus Temporal range: Late Permian (Wuchiapingian to Changhsingian), 256–253 Ma

Extinct genus of therapsids from late Permian South Africa and Tanzania

Theriognathus (from Greek therion: beast, mammal, Greek, gnathos, “jaw,” +us, pronounced THEH-ree-OG-nah-thuss) is an extinct genus of therocephalian therapsid belonging to the family Whaitsiidae, known from fossils from South Africa, Zambia, and Tanzania. Theriognathus has been dated as existing during the Late Permian. Although Theriognathus means mammal jaw, the lower jaw is actually made up of several bones as seen in modern reptiles, in contrast to mammals. Theriognathus displayed many different reptilian and mammalian characteristics. For example, Theriognathus had canine teeth like mammals, and a secondary palate, multiple bones in the mandible, and a typical reptilian jaw joint, all characteristics of reptiles. It is speculated that Theriognathus was either carnivorous or omnivorous, and was suited to hunting small prey in undergrowth. This synapsid adopted a sleek profile of a mammalian predator, with a narrow snout. Theriognathus is represented by 56 specimens in the fossil record. Theriognathus would go extinct during a turnover event that separated the lower and upper subzone of Daptocephalus Assemblage Zone, being replaced by the akidnognathid Moschorhinus.

== Classification ==
In 1980, most whaitsiid genera were synonymized with Theriognathus, creating two new species. Theriognathus major was the new combination for Whaitsia major, and Theriognathus laticeps was the new combination for Notosollasia laticeps. Whaitsiids like Theriognathus were once thought to be closely related to cynodonts, and were even thought to be ancestral to Cynodontia. A 2008 study found Therocephalia to be paraphyletic and placed Theriognathus as the sister-group to Cynodontia. In 2009, another phylogenetic analysis of therocephalians found that the group was monophyletic and placed Theriognathus in a deeply nested position within the clade.

== History of discovery ==
Theriognathus was first described by Sir Richard Owen in 1876 based on specimens that were discovered and donated by A.G. Bain from South Africa. The specimens (consisting of therocephalians, including Theriognathus) were described and illustrated in “Catalogue of the Fossil Reptiles of South Africa in the Collections of the British Museum,” by Owen. Theriognathus was considered a dicynodont at that time. In 1950, Von Huene described two Theriognathus skulls (whaitsiids Notosollasia and Notaelurops, now synonymous with Theriognathus), from the Upper Permian Ruhuhu Basin of Tanzania. In 1980, most whaitsiid genera were combined with Theriognathus, creating two species. Theriognathus major was the new species name that included Whaitsia major, and Theriognathus laticeps was the new species that included Notosollasia laticeps. Whaitsia, Alopecopsis, Notosallasia, Hyenosaurus, Moshorhynchus, Notaelurops, and Aneugomphius have been synonymized with Theriognathus. These genera were linked due to lack of postcanine teeth.

Results from the analysis of a basal cynodont, Charassognathus gracilis, from the Late Permian Tropidostoma Assemblage Zone, South Africa, supported an original hypothesis of T. S. Kemp’s concept of Therocephalia being paraphyletic, placing Cynodontia as the sister taxon to Theriognathus. This was significant in the relationship of Theriognathus and cynodonts, as well as being the first computer assisted cladistics analysis to support the possible paraphyletic relationship of Therocephalia. A few authors have supported this phylogenetic hypothesis, based on the existence of an enlarged epiterygoid and a quadrate notch in the squamosal.

== Description ==
Theriognathus was a large therocephalian, with the largest skulls reaching 33.6 cm (13.2 in) in length, making them one of the largest known therocephalians.

=== Skull ===
==== Skull roof ====
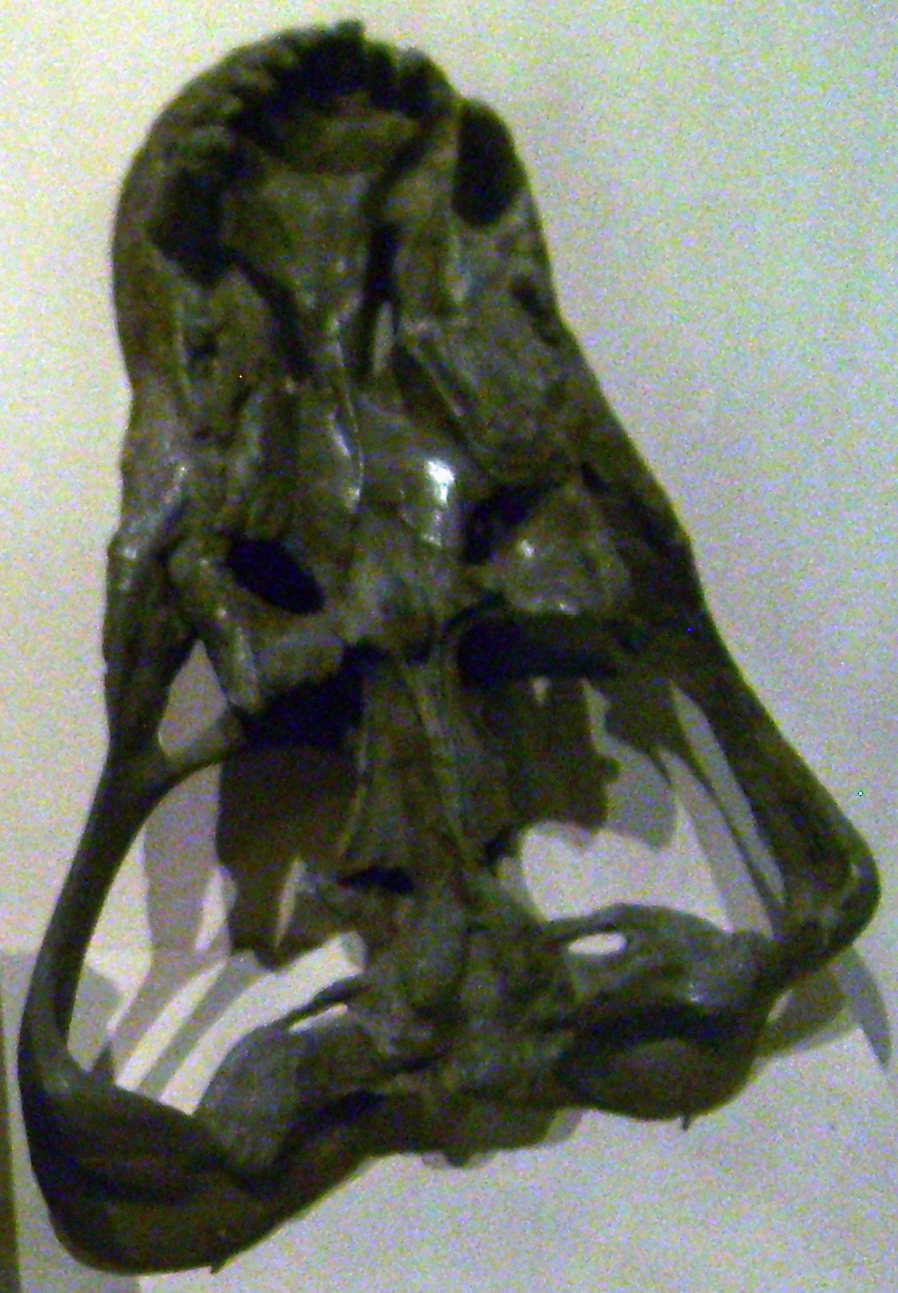
T. microps skull at the Museum für Naturkunde, Berlin

The anterodorsal-most tip of the premaxilla forms a rostral process, which overhangs the incisors, like in most eutherocephalians. The external nares are relatively large and face anterolaterally. The rostrum is relatively long and about as high as it is broad. A constriction of the snout exists directly behind the caniniforms, causing the snout to look relatively narrow. The posterior region of the maxillary facial plate is folded inward onto the palatal region, like in most non-akidnognathid whaitsioids. The suborbital bar is deep and slightly expanded. It extends from the jugal onto the posterior end of the maxillary facial plate, creating orbital convergence and appearing more triangular than circular in dorsal view. The orbit is positioned relatively high in the skull. There is a postorbital process on the jugal. The zygomatic arch is very slender. The parietal borders the temporal fenestra dorsally and is expanded posteriorly on the midline of the parietal foramen. The parietal crest is usually quite long, another trait shared with non-akidnognathid whaitsioids. The quadrate and quadratojugal are reduced in height, and situated in the depression on the anterior face of the squamosal. There is no nasal-lacrimal contact and no prefrontal-postorbital contact in adults.

==== Palate ====
The palatal fenestra of the lower caniniform merges with the internal naris. A portion of the vomer separates the choanae, and bears specialized transverse processes just anterior to the contact with the premaxilla. The vomers are either fused anteriorly or completely fused. No palatine teeth have ever been found on specimens of Theriognathus. The pterygoid flange expansion is severe, and looks like posteriorly protruding wings with a slight posterolateral tilt, a character shared with most therocephalians. The interpterygoid vacuity of Theriognathus adults is either absent or extremely reduced. Theriognathus shares this character with Moschowhaitsia, and is convergent in scylacosaurids.

==== Lower jaw ====
The dorsal process of the stapes in Theriognathus is greatly reduced or entirely absent. The dentary is short, shaped like a banana, and continuously tapers anteriorly to a narrow edge. The dentarys’ lateral surface is smooth. The posterodorsal terminal end of the coronoid process is more rounded, and the dorsal extent terminates below the middle of the orbit in adults. The postdentary bones are reduced to form a free standing coronoid process. The reflected lamina is spade shaped and does not extend below the dentary. The area between left and right dentaries remains relatively long and narrow just posterior to symphyseal region.

==== Dentition ====
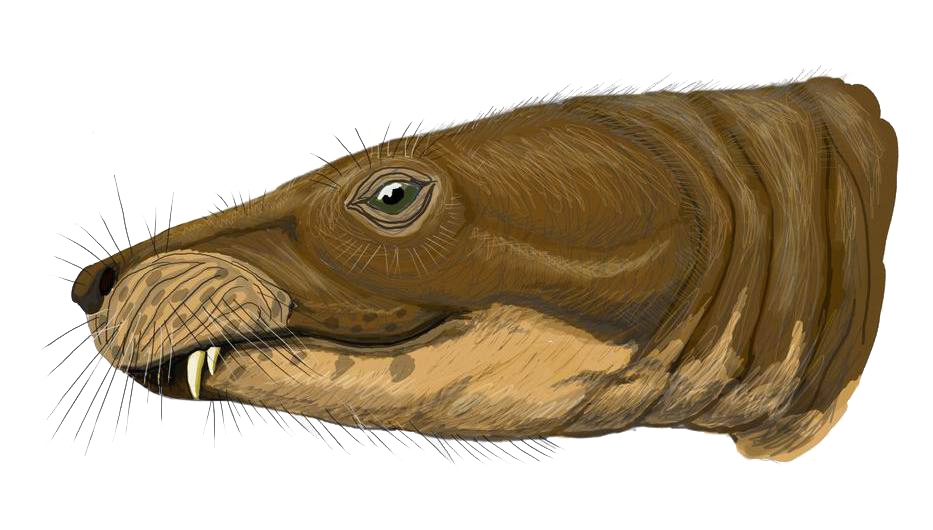
Restoration

Theriognathus has five or fewer interlocking incisors, which have longitudinal grooves. There are four lower incisors. The incisors are relatively straight and conical. There are no functional upper postcanines and the upper canine is large in adults. The incisor cutting margins are smoothly ridged. Lower canines are large in adults, and post-canine teeth exist in the lower jaw.

=== Post-cranial ===
The pubis and ischium alignment is horizontal, with a wide puboischiatic plate.

== Paleobiology ==
=== Bone histology ===
Ricqlès (1969) suggested differential rates of growth between a basal therocephalian from the Middle Permian of South Africa and the Late Permian whaitsiid Notosollasia (now synonymous with Theriognathus). According to Ricqlès, Theriognathus’ radius midshaft bone wall is extremely thick and has a reduced central cavity without cancellous structures. The vascular motif is primarily longitudinal and radial. Ricqlès suggested that therocephalians might have exhibited accelerated growth rates later in their evolutionary history due to the comparatively more vascularized cortical bone in the radius of the whaitsiid.

The femur bears a relatively thick wall as well, and could be related to impact loading, due to its orientation. The thick cortical bone is made many primary osteons in a parallel and woven fibered matrix. There are numerous osteocyte lacunae that have a spherical shape within the growth zones, but more lenticular and ordered near growth marks. The cortex has a moderate amount of vascularization. The pattern and number of the growth marks indicated some amount of plasticity in the growth style of Theriognathus.

== Distribution ==
Theriognathus is represented by abundant occurrences in the Karoo Basin of South Africa, sequestered records in the Upper Permian Ruhuhu Basin of Tanzania and Zambia. Late Permian therapsids are best known from the Karoo Basin, which covers a massive area and provides Permian sediments that total 12 km in thickness. During the Late Permian, sediments were fed into the Karoo Basin from a ring of mountains that encircled Southern Gondwana (an ancient supercontinent, partly located on what is now South America and Antarctica) In the Karoo is the Beaufort Group, a subdivision of the basin. This division is further broken down into assemblage zones, intervals of geological strata that are defined based on the distributions of previously found tetrapod taxa.

Theriognathus remains have been found in the upper Cistecephalus and lower Daptocephalus assemblage zones, as well as Usili Formation and upper Madumabisa Mudstone Formation. While so experts suggested Theriognathus was also found in the Tapinocephalus assemblage zone, other experts noted the genus first appearing in the upper Cistecephalus assemblage zone.

== Extinction ==
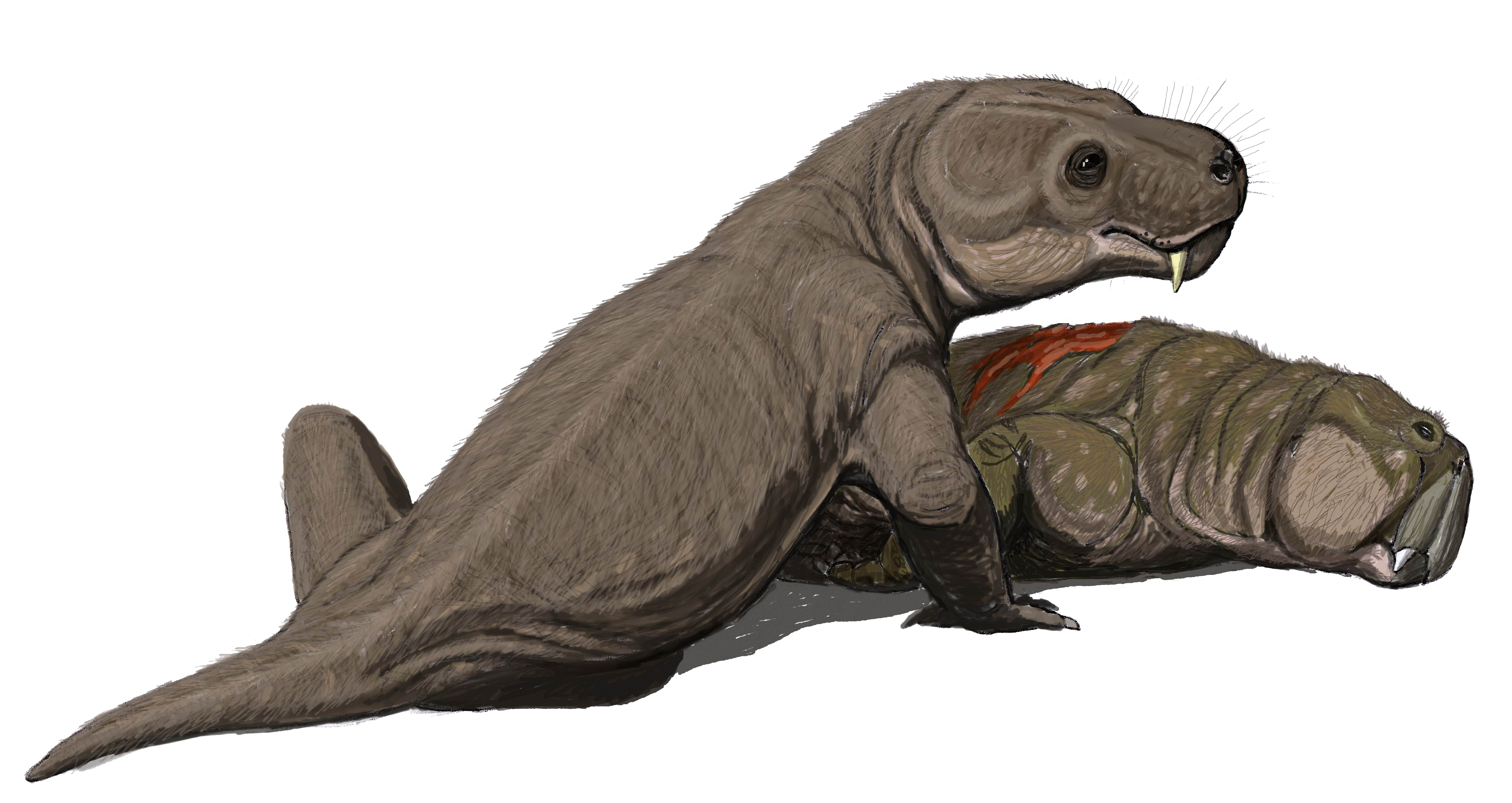
Life reconstruction of Moschorhinus, a akidnognathid that replaced Theriognathus following the turnover event

Theriognathus was noted to have been absent in the upper subzone of the Daptocephalus assemblage zones, suggesting Theriognathus went extinct during the turnover event that separated the two subzones. The turnover event that separated the two subzones was likely due to aridification, which saw the decline of lacustrine floodplains, which were replaced by well-drained floodplains. The transition also saw the appearance of Lystrosaurus maccaigi, which became increasing abundant following the end of the transition. The turnover event also saw the extinction of gorgonopsians such as rubidgeines and Lyaencops, dicynodonts such as Diictodon feliceps and Aulacephalodon bainii, and the cynodont Procynosuchus delarharpeae. Following its extinction, Theriognathus was replaced by theriodontian predators such as the Moschorhinus.
