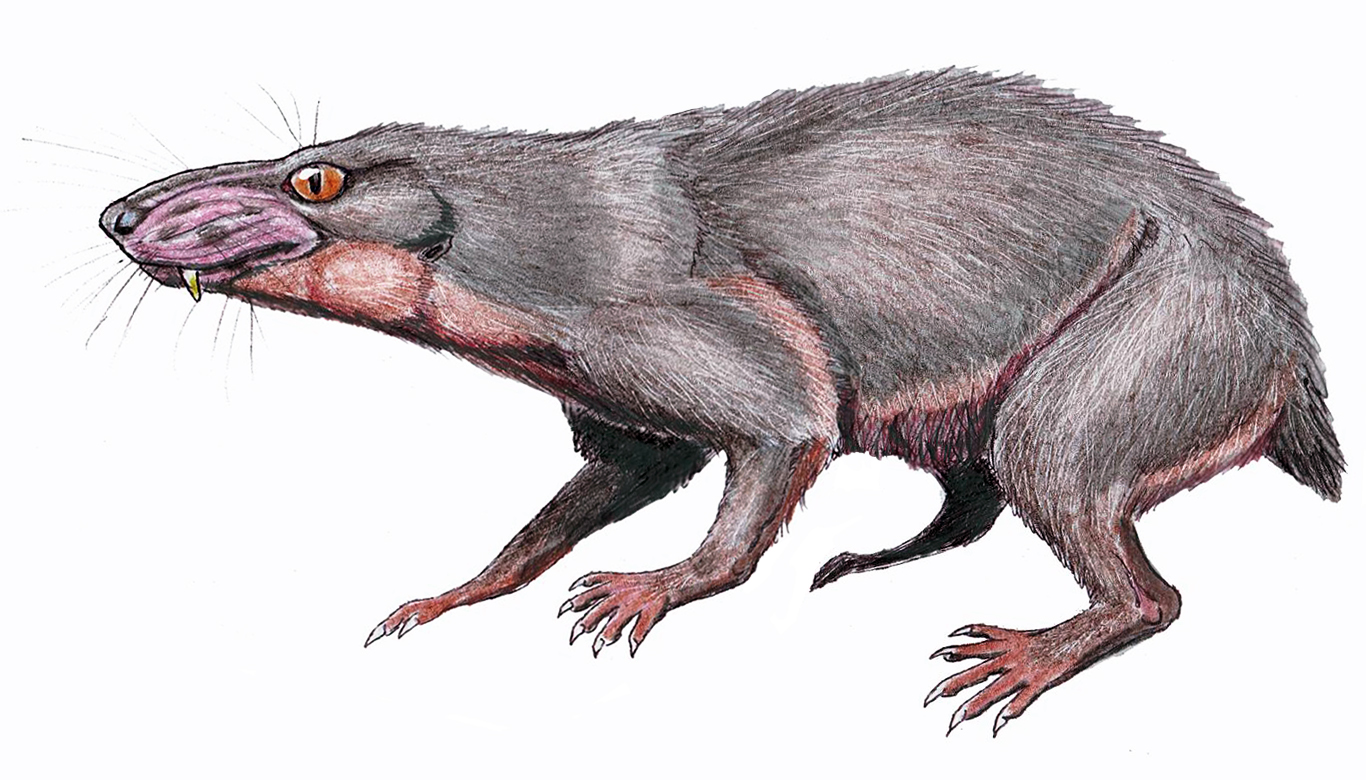
- Life restoration of Regisaurus jacobi

Scientific classification
- Domain: Eukaryota
- Kingdom: Animalia
- Phylum: Chordata
- Clade: Synapsida
- Clade: Therapsida
- Clade: †Therocephalia
- Clade: †Eutherocephalia
- Superfamily: †Baurioidea; Broom, 1911

Genera
- Dongusaurus; Homodontosaurus; Icticephalus; Ictidodon; Ictidodraco; Ictidognathus; Ictidosuchops; Jiucaiyuangnathus; Macroscelesaurus; Nanictocephalus; Nanictosuchus; Polycynodon; Rhigosaurus; Scalopocephalus; Scalopodon; Scalopolacerta; Scaloposaurus; Silphictidoides; Silpholestes; Yikezhaogia; Ictidosuchidae Broom, 1903; Blattoidealestes; Chlynovia; Ictidosuchoides; Ictidosuchus; Malasaurus; Muchia?; Perplexisaurus?; Scalopodontes; Scaloporhinus?; Scaloposuchus; Karenitidae; Karenites; Mupashi; Lycideopidae; Choerosaurus; Lycideops; Tetracynodon; Regisauridae; Regisaurus; Urumchia; Ericiolacertidae; Ericiolacerta; Pedaeosaurus; Silphedosuchus?; Bauriidae; Nothogomphodon; "Ordosiidae"; Hazhenia; Ordosiodon; Bauriinae; Antecosuchus; Bauria; Microgomphodon; Scalopognathus; Traversodontoides

Synonyms
- Bauriamorpha Watson and Romer, 1956; Scaloposauria Boonstra, 1953

= Baurioidea =

Baurioidea Temporal range: Late Permian - Middle Triassic

Extinct superfamily of therapsids

Baurioidea is a superfamily of therocephalian therapsids. It includes advanced therocephalians such as Regisaurus and Bauria. The superfamily was named by South African paleontologist Robert Broom in 1911. Bauriamorpha, named by D. M. S. Watson and Alfred Romer in 1956, is a junior synonym of Baurioidea.

Many baurioids were once placed in a group called Scaloposauria. Scaloposaurs were characterized by their small size and reduced postorbital bar (a strut of bone behind the eye socket). Scaloposauria is no longer recognized as a valid taxon because it likely represents juvenile forms of many groups of therocephalians. Most scaloposaurs, including Scaloposaurus and Regisaurus, are now classified in various positions within Bauroidea.

Many therocephalians once classified as scaloposaurians are now considered basal baurioids. The classification of these species is uncertain, as there have been no comprehensive phylogenetic analyses of scaloposaurian taxa. The validity of many of these species is questionable, as future studies may find some to be synonymous. Below is a list of these taxa:

- Ictidosuchoides
- Scaloposaurus
- Tetracynodon
- Zorillodontops
- Homodontosaurus
- Ictidosuchops
- Nanictidops
- Scaloporhinus
- Scaloposuchus
- Choerosaurus
- Ictidostoma
- Ictidosuchus
- Malasaurus
- Chlynovia
- Karenites
- Perplexisaurus
- Scalopodon
- Scalopodontes
