= Lycideopidae =

Lycideopidae Temporal range: Late Permian - Early Triassic

Scientific classification
- Kingdom: Animalia
- Phylum: Chordata
- Clade: Synapsida
- Clade: Therapsida
- Clade: †Therocephalia
- Superfamily: †Baurioidea
- Family: †Lycideopidae; Boonstra, 1934

Genera
- Choerosaurus; Lycideops; Tetracynodon

Extinct family of therapsids

Lycideopidae is an extinct family of therocephalians from the Late Permian and Early Triassic of South Africa.

== Phylogeny ==
Below is a cladogram from Sigurdsen et al. (2012):

- Therapsida
  - Biarmosuchus tener
  - Titanophoneus potens
  - - Gorgonopsia
    - - Anomodontia
      - Eutheriodontia
        - Cynodontia
          - Charassognathus gracilis
          - - Dvinia prima
            - Procynosuchus delaharpeae
        - Therocephalia
          - Lycosuchus vanderrieti
          - - Glanosuchus macrops
            - Ictidosaurus angusticeps
            - Pristerognathus polyodon
          - Eutherocephalia
            - - Euchambersia mirabilis
              - - Promoschorhynchus platyrhinus
                - Olivierosuchus parringtoni
              - - Cerdops burgheri
                - Moschorhinus kitchingi
            - - Ictidostoma hemburyi
              - Hofmeyria atavus
              - Mirotenthes digitipes
              - - Viatkosuchus sumini
                - - Moschowhaitsia vjuschkovi
                  - Theriognathus microps
              - Baurioidea
                - Ictidosuchus primaevus
                - Ictidosuchops rubidgei
                - Ictidosuchoides longiceps
                - Regisaurus jacobi
                - Scaloposaurus constrictus
                - Ericiolacerta parva
                - Bauriidae
                - Lycideopidae
                  - Lycideops longiceps
                  - - Choerosaurus dejageri
                    - - Tetracynodon tenuis
                      - Tetracynodon darti
