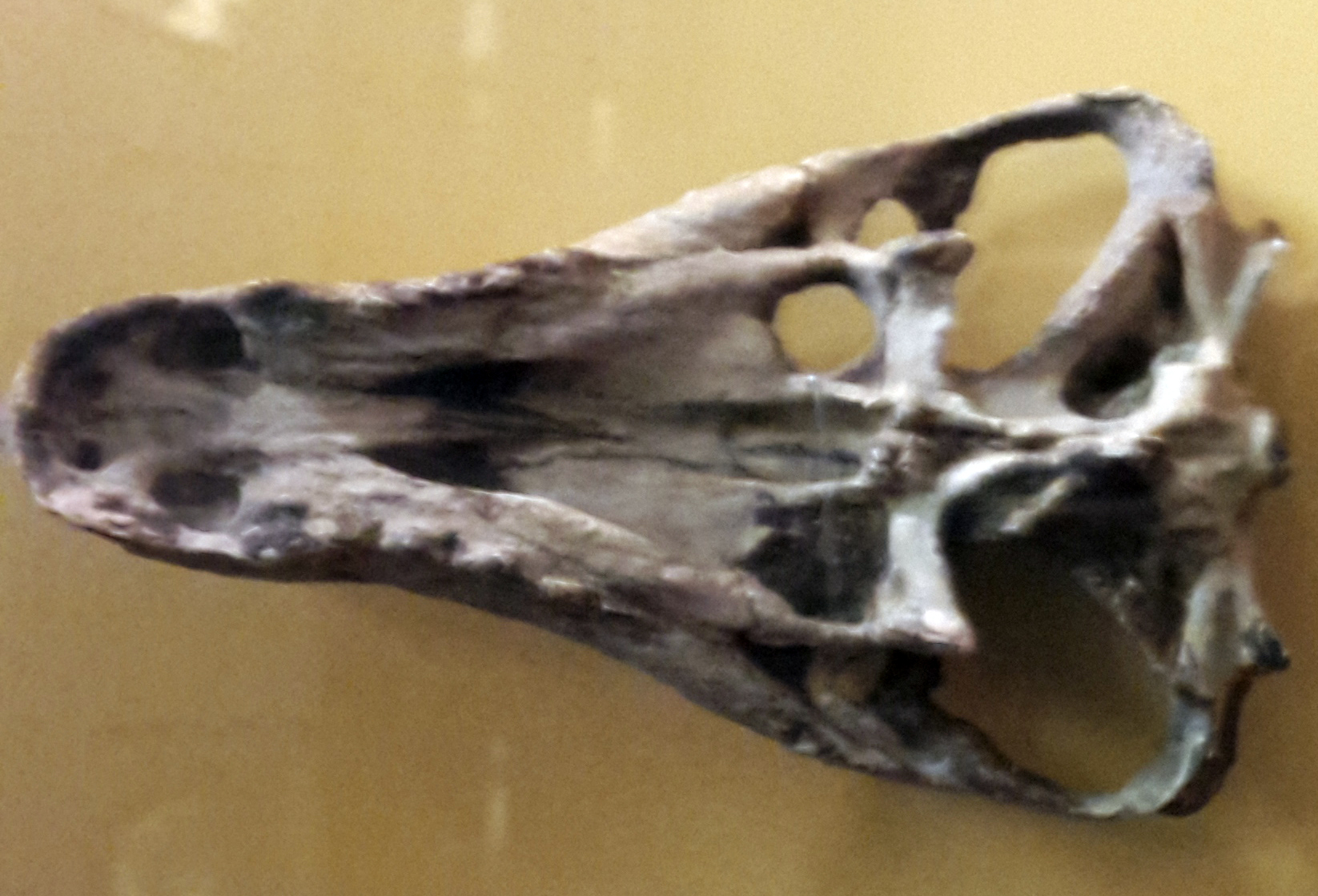
- Skull cast seen from below, Museum of Evolution of Polish Academy of Sciences, Warsaw

Scientific classification
- Kingdom: Animalia
- Phylum: Chordata
- Clade: Synapsida
- Clade: Therapsida
- Clade: †Therocephalia
- Family: †Regisauridae
- Genus: †Regisaurus

Species
- †R. jacobi Mendrez, 1972

= Regisaurus =

Regisaurus Temporal range: Early Triassic

Genus of therapsids from the Early Triassic of South Africa

Regisaurus ("Rex's lizard", named after Francis Rex Parrington) is an extinct genus of small carnivorous therocephalian. It is known from a single described species, the type species Regisaurus jacobi, from the Early Triassic Lystrosaurus Assemblage Zone of South Africa, although at least one undescribed species is also known.

== Description ==
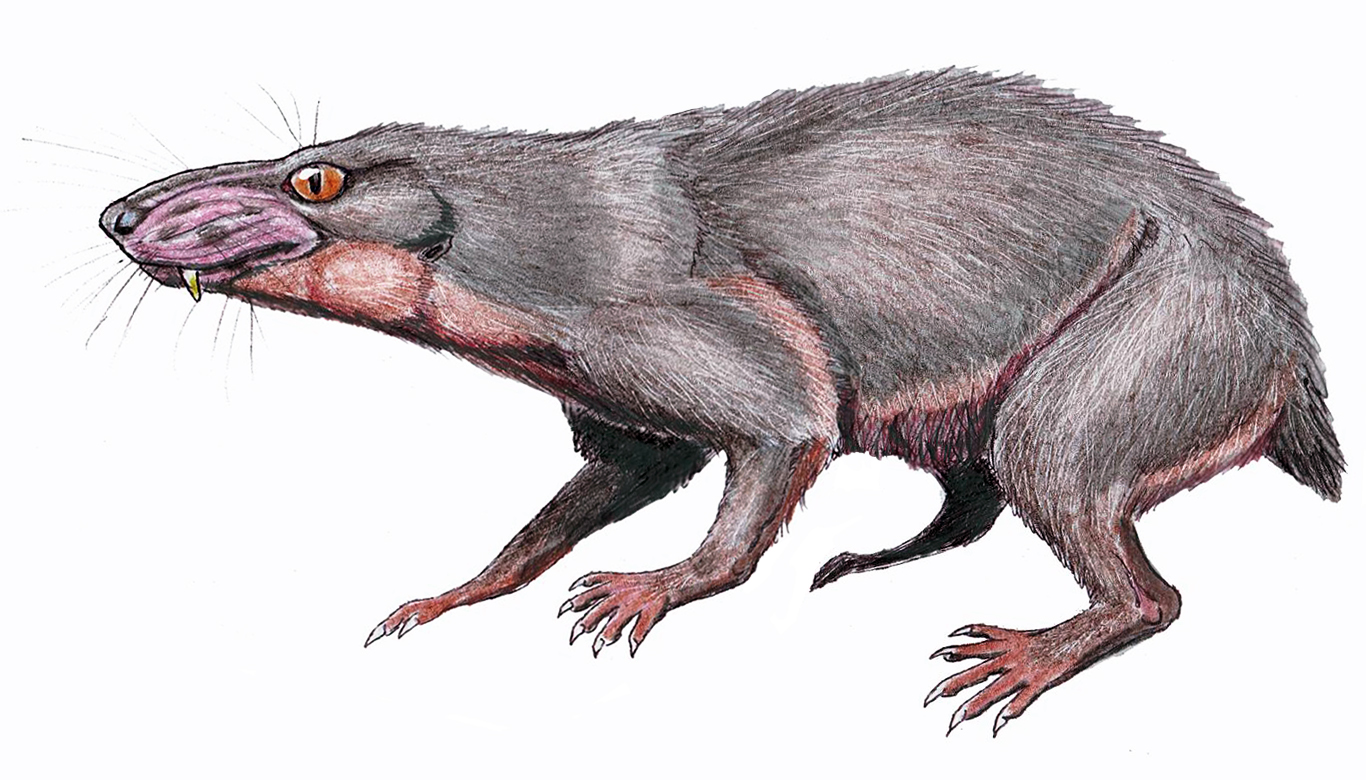
Restoration

It was a rather derived baurioid, with a robust skull, short tail, long limbs and relatively large canines. It was apparently related to Urumchia and like Urumchia, it had vomer bones, which form the secondary palate, but they do not narrow to a tip like in Urumchia. However, it retained some primitive characteristics. It had six incisor teeth in each side of the jaw, whereas other baurioids had less. It was probably carnivorous, and ate insects and small vertebrates

== Discovery and species ==
Regisaurus was discovered in 1964 by James W. Kitching and it was named in 1972 by C. H. Mendrez. Two species are known, the type species Regisaurus jacobi and an additional undescribed species. R. jacobi is known from the holotype FRP 1964/27 and the referred specimen BP/1/3973, while the undescribed species is known only from the Holotype T837.

== Classification ==
Below is a cladogram modified from Sidor (2001) and Huttenlocker (2009):

- Baurioidea
  - Ictidosuchops rubidgei
  - Ictidosuchidae
    - Ictidosuchus primaevus
    - Ictidosuchoides longiceps
  - - Regisauridae
      - Regisaurus jacobi
      - Urumchia lii
    - - - Karenitidae
          - NHCC LB44 (Unnamed Zambian karenitid)
          - Karenites ornamentatus
        - Lycideopidae
          - Lycideops longiceps
          - - Choerosaurus dejageri
            - - Tetracynodon tenuis
              - Tetracynodon darti
      - - Scaloposaurus constrictus
        - - Ericiolacertidae
            - Ericiolacerta parva
            - Silphedosuchus orenburgensis
          - - Nothogomphodon danilovi
            - "Ordosiidae"
              - Hazhenia concava
              - Ordosiodon youngi
            - Bauriidae
              - Bauria cynops
              - - Antecosuchus ochevi
                - Microgomphodon oligocynus
                - Traversodontoides wangwuensis

== See also ==
- List of therapsids
- Segisaurus
