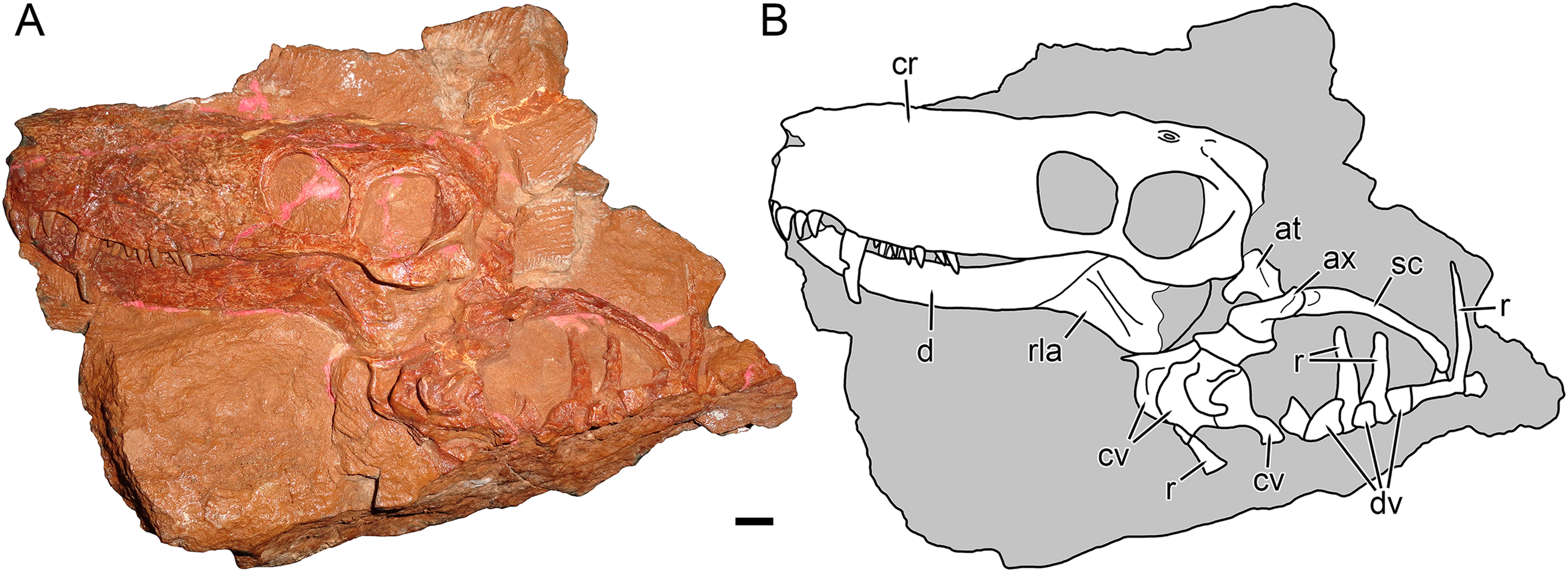
- The holotype block containing skull and partial skeleton (KPM 310), followed by an interpretative drawing

Scientific classification
- Kingdom: Animalia
- Phylum: Chordata
- Clade: Synapsida
- Clade: Therapsida
- Clade: †Gorgonopsia
- Genus: †Nochnitsa; Kammerer & Masyutin, 2018

Type species
- † Nochnitsa geminidens Kammerer & Masyutin, 2018

= Nochnitsa =

Nochnitsa Temporal range: Permian, 260–256 Ma

Extinct genus of therapsids

Nochnitsa is a genus of gorgonopsian (predatory therapsids, the group including modern mammals) that lived during the Permian period in what is now Russia. The first fossil was found at the Kotelnich locality near the Vyatka River and was made the holotype of the new genus and species N. geminidens in 2018. The generic name refers to the Nocnitsa, an evil nocturnal spirit from Slavic mythology, and is intended as a regional counterpart to the Gorgons of Greek mythology, often referenced in the names of the group. The specific name, meaning "twin tooth", alludes to its paired autapomorphic postcanine teeth. The holotype specimen consists of a near complete skull associated with some partial postcranial bones.

With an approximately 8 cm (3.1 in) long skull, Nochnitsa was a relatively small gorgonopsian. The snout was elongated, and the teeth were generally inclined backward, pointed, and serrated. The canines (the saber teeth) were much larger than the incisors at the front and postcanines behind but relatively small for a gorgonopsian. Nochnitsa was distinct from other members of the group by the arrangement of its upper postcanine teeth, which were paired and separated by short diastema (gap). Its lower jaw, very similar to that of therocephalians, lacked the characteristic mentum ("chin") of gorgonopsians and exhibited a low mandibular symphysis. The known elements of the postcranial skeleton do not show notable differences compared to those of other gorgonopsians. They indicate, however, a gracile humerus, the apparent absence of reduced, disc-shaped phalanges typically present in the group, and possible metacarpals among the largest known among gorgonopsians.

Since its formal description, phylogenetic analyzes found Nochnitsa to be the earliest-diverging gorgonopsians known, followed by Viatkogorgon, also from Kotelnich. All other gorgonopsians appear to belong to two, later-diverging Russian and African groups. The age of the Vanyushonki Member of the Kotelnich succession, from which Nochnitsa is known, is not determined but is thought to date to either the late or middle Permian epoch. The small size of Nochnitsa compared to its contemporary Viatkogorgon and the therocephalians from this locality suggests that it occupied a comparatively minor predatory role.

== Discovery and naming ==
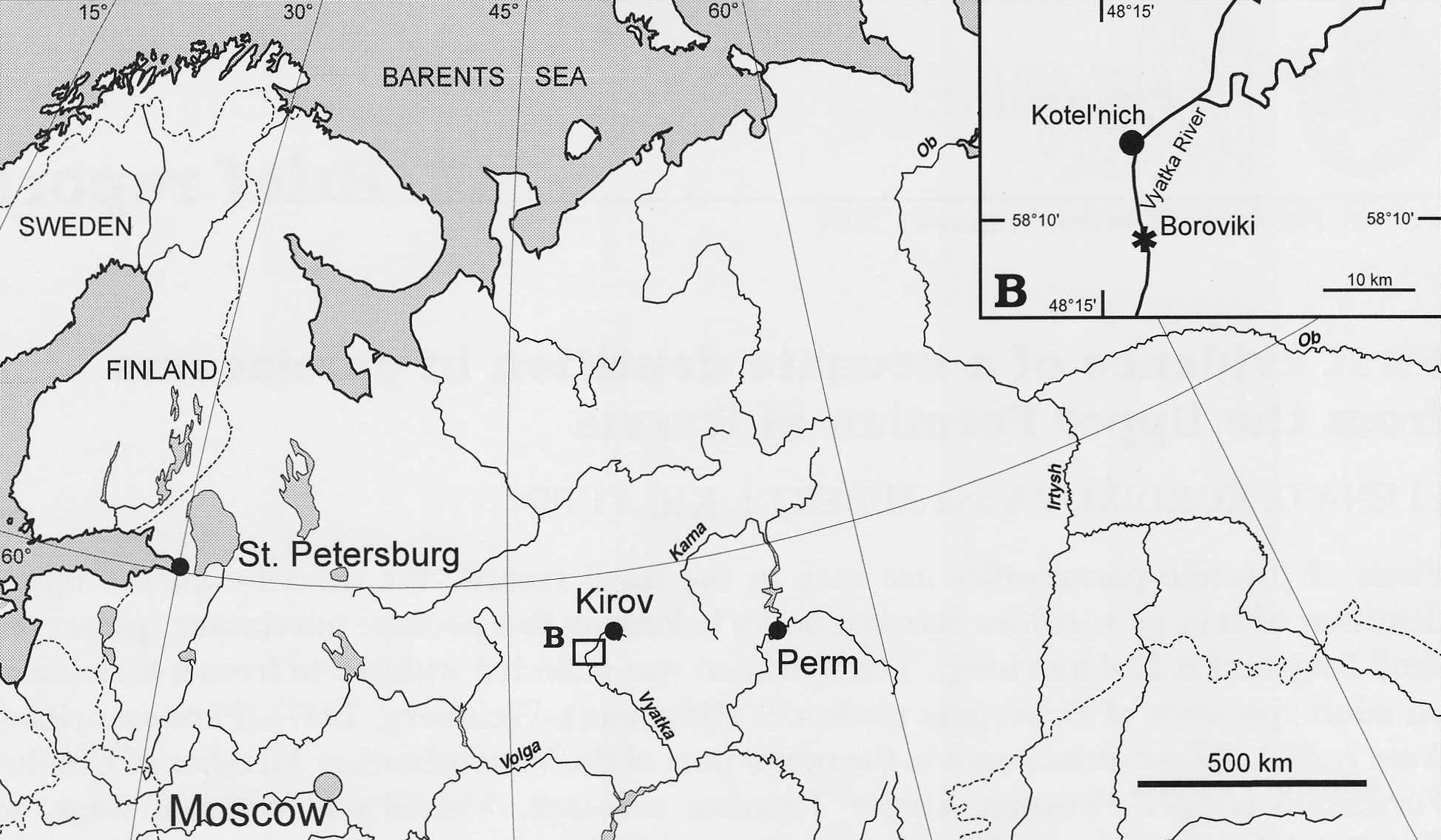
Map showing the Kotelnich locality in Russia where Nochnitsa was found (lower middle left box, magnified in inset box at upper right).

The only known specimen of Nochnitsa was discovered in 1994 by the Russian paleontologist Albert J. Khlyupin at the Kotelnich locality of Kotelnichsky District, in Russia's Kirov Oblast, a region known for its Permian exposures on the banks of the Vyatka River. After being collected, the specimen was transferred to the Paleontological Museum of Vyatka, where it is since catalogued as KPM 310. Following preparation, it consists of a nearly complete and relatively well-preserved skull associated with a partial skeleton, including ribs, the axial portion of the vertebral column, and an incomplete right forelimb. While the left side of the skull is well preserved, the right side is laterally compressed and largely obscured by forelimb elements embedded in the rock matrix. Some sutures remain difficult to distinguish, and the snout exhibits several surface crackings. A large crack extending from the anterior margin of the left eye socket to the right temporal fenestra has been filled with plaster, and other smaller cracks have been repaired with silicone rubber. Furthermore, the surface of the palatine bone is completely obscured by the occluded mandible.

In a 2018 paper, the American paleontologist Christian F. Kammerer and his Russian colleague Vladimir Masyutin described the specimen as the holotype of a new genus and species of gorgonopsian, Nochnitsa geminidens. The generic name Nochnitsa refers to the Nocnitsa, a nocturnal evil spirit from Slavic mythology. It is intended as a regional counterpart to the Gorgons of Greek mythology, which are the namesake of many genera within Gorgonopsia. The specific epithet geminidens is derived from the Latin geminus, "twin" and dens, "tooth", in reference to the paired autapomorphic postcanine teeth of the animal. Russian gorgonopsid discoveries began in the 1890s with the finding of Inostrancevia, one of the largest members of the group. Few additional finds were made over the two next centuries; Nochnitsa thus represents the first valid gorgonopsian described from Russia since Suchogorgon in 2000, the country remaining the only place outside Africa where the group is definitely known. Nochnitsa also represents the second gorgonopsian described from Kotelnich after Viatkogorgon in 1999; on that occasion, Kammerer and Masyutin redescribed the holotype skull of the latter in order to compare it with that of the new taxon.

== Description ==
=== Skull ===
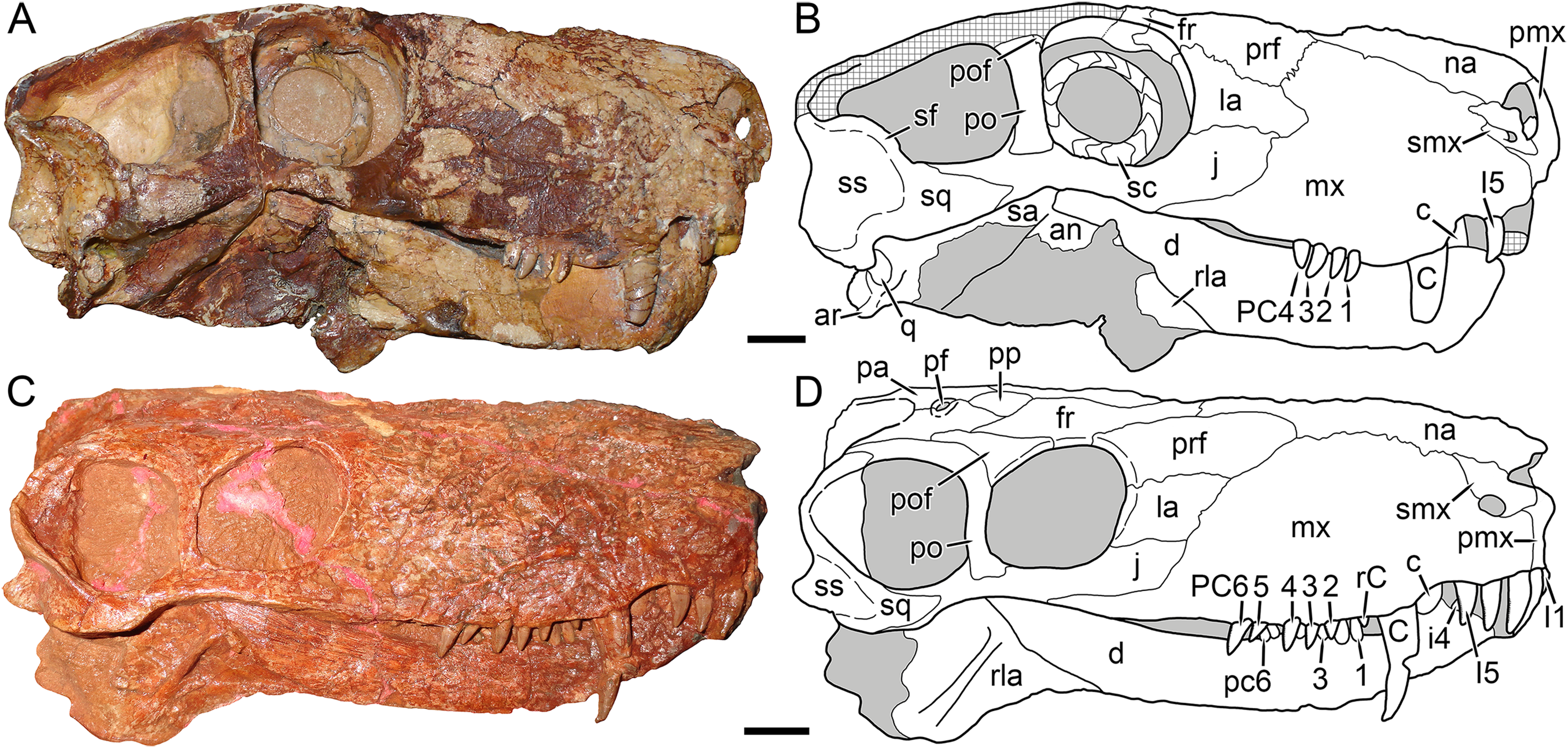
Skull and diagram (not to scale) of the type specimens of Nochnitsa (C–D; shown inverted) and Viatkogorgon (A–B). Grey areas indicate rock matrix and hatching indicates plaster reconstruction

Nochnitsa was a particularly small gorgonopsian, with the holotype possessing a skull measuring 82 mm (3.2 in) in length. For comparison, the largest Late Permian gorgonopsians such as Inostrancevia and Rubidgea reached skull lengths in excess of 40 cm (16 in). The snout of Nochnitsa was relatively elongate for a gorgonopsian. The premaxilla (the frontmost bone of the upper jaw) was little exposed on the side surface of the snout, as in Viatkogorgon. As in most gorgonopsians, five incisors (front teeth) are present on each side. The upper incisors are slightly recurved, with clear serrations towards their tips. As in Viatkogorgon, it remains uncertain whether their size decreased posteriorly along the tooth-row, as the only two intact incisors of their holotypes correspond to the same tooth position on each side (I5). In general, the teeth were pointed, flattened on the outer side, and somewhat convex on the inner side, and the serrated area of each tooth was displaced towards the outer edge of the crowns. The septomaxilla (a small bone between the nasal bone and the maxilla, the main bone of the upper jaw) had a longer side facing process than Viatkogorgon.

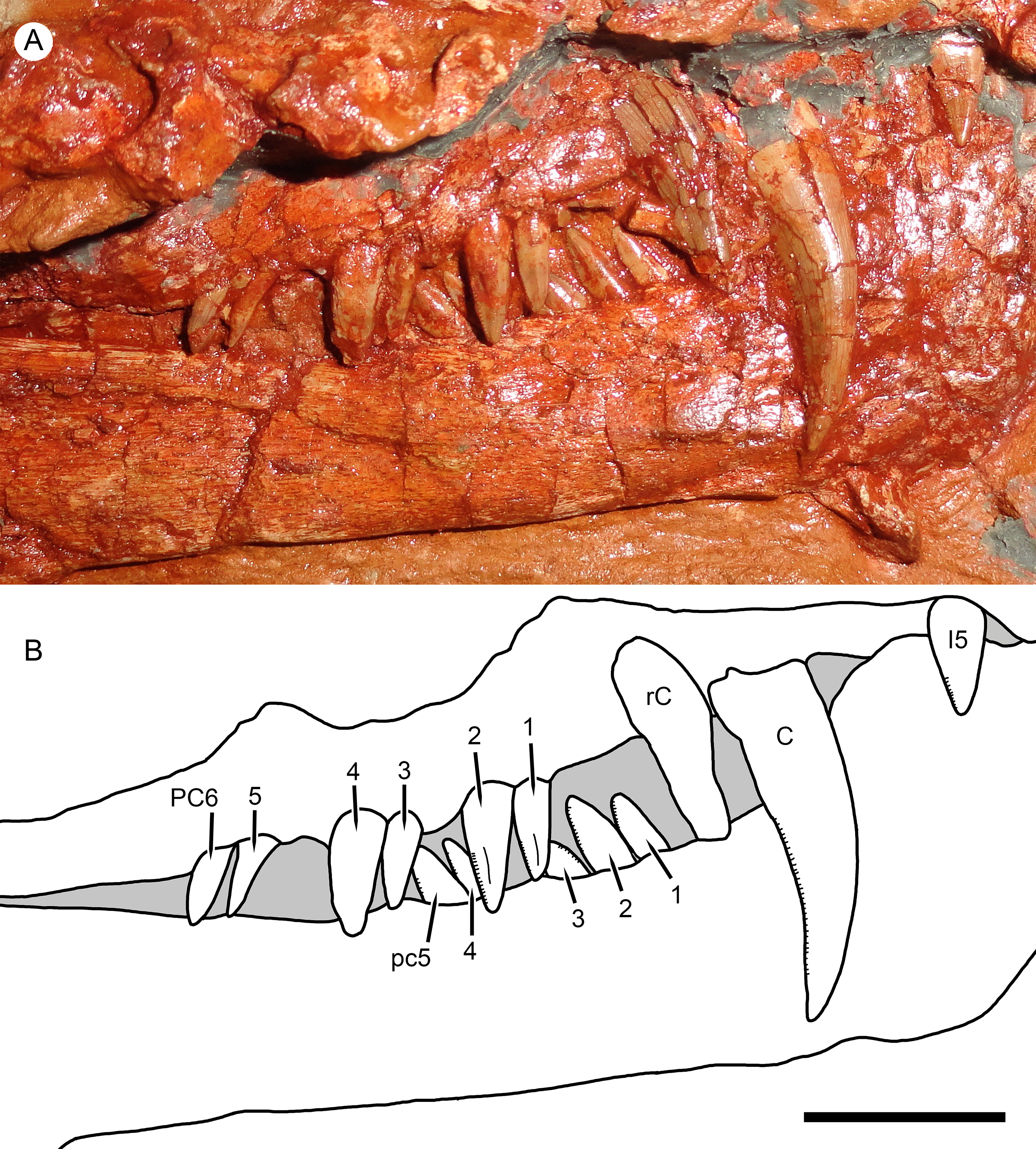
Close-up view of the holotype's dentition, as preserved on the right side

The maxilla of Nochnitsa was relatively long and low for a gorgonopsian, with a rounded dorsal margin. The posterior process forming the lower edge of the maxilla was longer than in Viatkogorgon and extended to the midpoint of the orbit beneath the jugal bone. The "step" by the diastema (gap) between the incisors and the canine (the saber-tooth) was less pronounced than in Viatkogorgon. As in this latter, the canine of Nochnitsa was relatively small for a gorgonopsian and bore serrations along its posterior edge. However, unlike its contemporary, the tooth row behind the canine, although shorter than the canine and the incisors, comprised up to six elongate postcanines, inclined posteriorly and also serrated. A feature unique among therapsids, these postcanine teeth were arranged in three pairs separated by short diastemata of approximately 2 mm (0.079 in). Within each pair, the anterior tooth was smaller than the posterior one. The maxilla bore a low ridge above this tooth row, less developed than in Viatkogorgon, Eriphostoma, and the rubidgeines.

The nasal bone (located at the posterior margin of the external nostrils) was slightly narrower anteriorly than in Viatkogorgon. The prefrontal bone (situated on the forehead, above and anterior to the orbit) was proportionally longer than in the latter and contributed more extensively to the anterosuperior margin of the orbit, where the lacrimal bone (forming the anterior margin of the orbit) occupied a smaller portion. The orbit of Nochnitsa was also smaller than that of Viatkogorgon. In dorsal view, the frontal bone was hexagonal in shape and made a substantial contribution to the orbits, unlike in other gorgonopsians. The postfrontal (located above and behind the orbit) was relatively well developed in Nochnitsa, a condition common in basal therapsids but less so in more derived forms. The jugal, which formed the lower margin of the orbit, occupied a less extensive portion of the lateral surface than in Viatkogorgon.

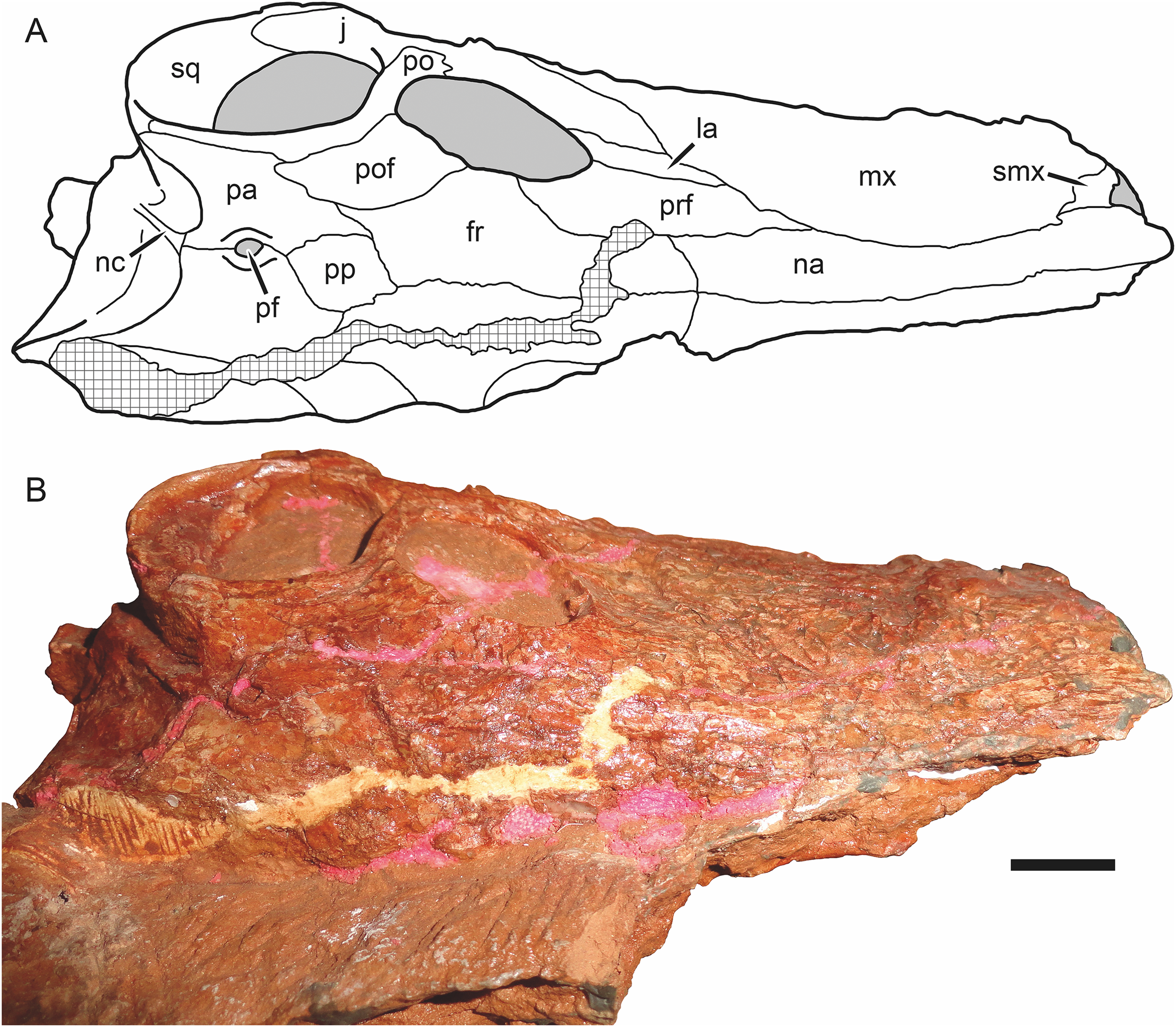
Dorsal view of the holotype skull

The postorbital bar (located between the orbit and the temporal fenestra) was weakly curved anteriorly, with its ventral end only slightly expanded anteroposteriorly, in contrast to the more pronounced expansion seen in more derived gorgonopsians. The preparietal bone (situated between the frontal and parietal bones at the top of the skull) was an unornamented, rhomboidal median bone positioned between the frontals and parietals, and separated from the pineal foramen by a short median suture. The parietal of Nochnitsa, forming the main element of the intertemporal skull roof, bore attenuated processes and was pierced anteriorly by a small pineal foramen surrounded by a collar-like rim, not elevated into a "chimney" as in many basal therapsids. The squamosal was largely restricted to the occiput and the zygomatic arch, these regions being separated by a ridge bearing a squamosal sulcus confined to the zygomatic portion, and it terminated in a pointed anterior process that did not reach the postorbital bar. As the occipital bones were indistinct, the occiput exhibited a long, well-developed nuchal crest extending uninterrupted from the top of the occipital plate to the foramen magnum along the midline.

The lower jaw of Nochnitsa was highly unusual for a gorgonopsian, exhibiting a morphology more reminiscent of that of therocephalians. The dentary bone (the tooth-bearing bone at the front of the lower jaw) and mandibular symphysis (the area where the two halves of the mandible connected at the front) were low and lacked the distinct mentum (or "chin") characteristic of gorgonopsians, instead displaying a long, gradually sloping anterior surface. The coronoid process (part of where the jaw connected to the skull) was only weakly inclined dorsally and had a convex posterior margin, unlike in most gorgonopsians. The lower teeth were generally similar to their upper counterparts, but showed several notable differences. The incisors were shorter, and the postcanines were not paired, being arranged instead in a continuous row of closely spaced teeth. The arrangement of these lower postcanines suggests that they were in fact more numerous than six, forming a dense tooth row that matched the length of the upper dentition. The only other known element of the lower jaw is the reflected lamina of the angular bone, which was long, narrow, and inclined posteriorly and ventrally, bearing a single longitudinal ridge and located near the articular bone (which forms the jaw joint).

=== Postcranial skeleton ===
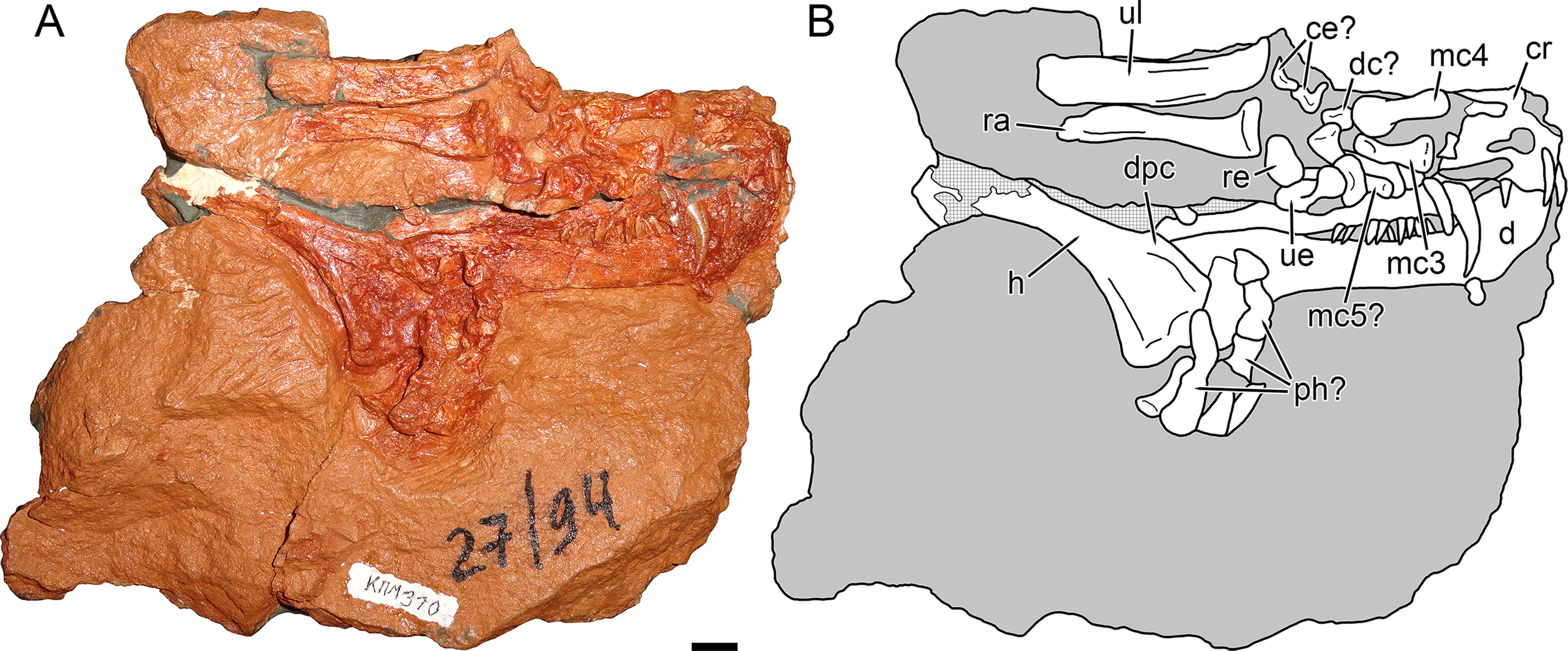
Right side of the block containing the holotype specimen, showing in more detail the postcranial remains known of the taxon

The axial vertebrae of Nochnitsa where broadly rounded and similar to those of other gorgonopsians. The ribs where simple and elongate. The scapula was also elongate, narrow, and slightly curved, comparable to that of similarly sized gorgonopsians such as Cyonosaurus, in contrast to the anteroposteriorly expanded scapular spines of Inostrancevia. The humerus of Nochnitsa was relatively gracile, with a short and weakly developed deltopectoral crest (where muscles attached to the upper arm). The radius and ulna (lower arm bones) exhibited a marked distal curvature, and the distal end of the radius formed a distinct margin relative to the shaft. No olecranon process is visible on the ulna, although this may result from damage. The proximal end of this bone is in fact incomplete and was partially replaced by mudstone during the fossilization of the holotype.

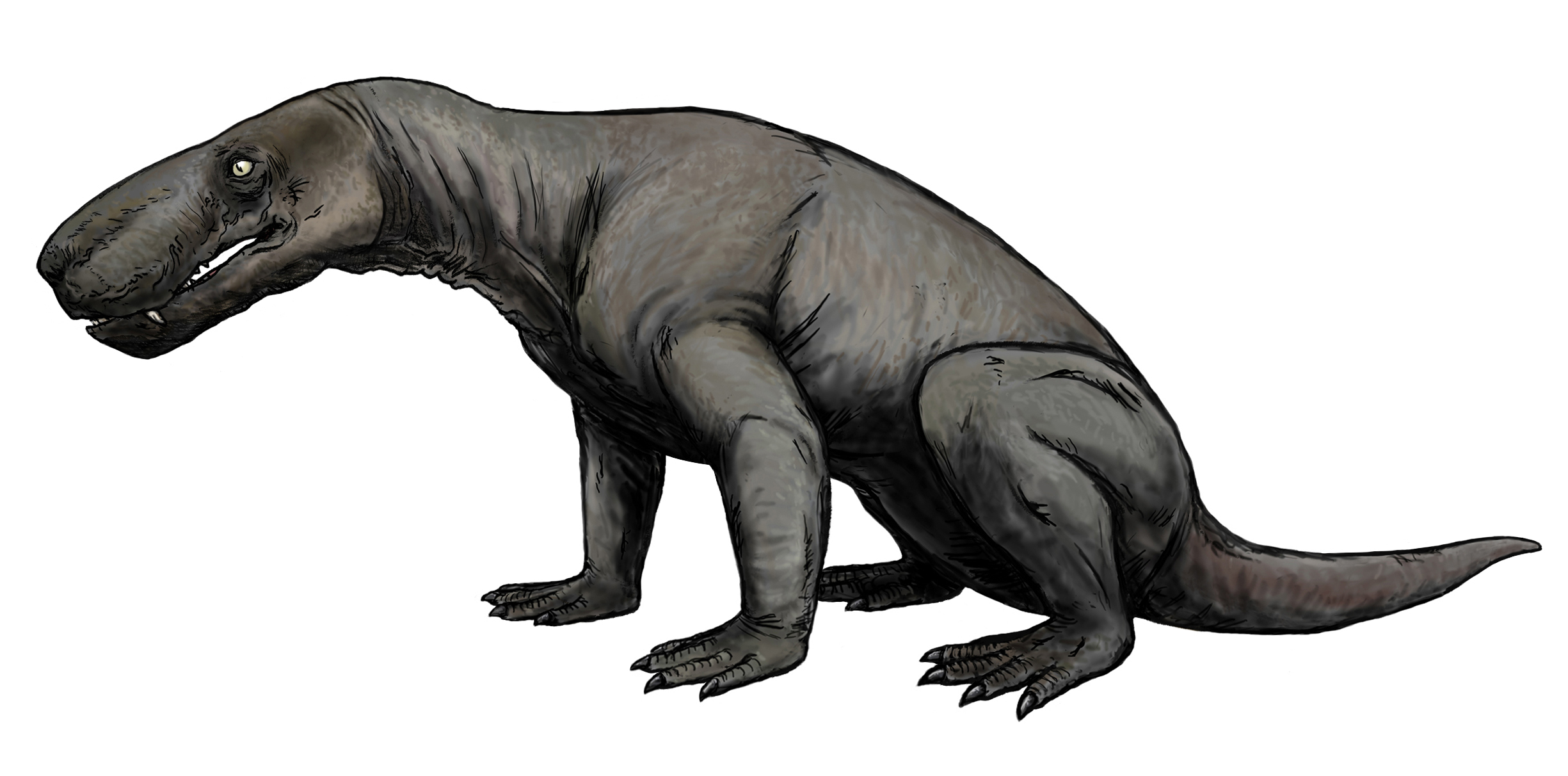
Life restoration

The state of preservation of the holotype's hand elements does not allow for a precise description of its anatomy or a definitive count of the phalanges. None of the preserved bones from this anatomical region suggest the presence of reduced, disc-shaped phalanges, as seen in other gorgonopsians. The preserved proximal carpal bones include the radiale, ulnare, and two smaller, irregular elements interpreted as probable centralia. The ulnare was larger than the radiale, with expanded proximal and distal ends, whereas the radiale was more rounded. The presumed centralia, though poorly preserved, appeared slightly curved and, as in most gorgonopsians, would have articulated with the radiale. Bones interpreted as the metacarpals linked with the third and fourth digits may rank among the largest known in gorgonopsians.

== Classification ==
Gorgonopsians were a group of carnivorous therapsids that included the apex predators of the late Permian. While they were abundant, they varied little in morphology. Though widespread in southern Africa during the Permian, they are poorly represented in the fossil record of the rest of the world, and only definitely known from Russia. Gorgonopsians were early synapsids, the group in which modern mammals belong; similar to reptiles in some respects, they are therefore considered stem-mammals (earlier inaccurately termed "mammal-like reptiles"). Gorgonopsians were the first group of predatory animals to develop saber teeth, long before true mammals and dinosaurs evolved. This feature later evolved independently multiple times in different predatory mammal groups, such as felids and thylacosmilids. Gorgonopsians disappeared with the end-Permian mass extinction.

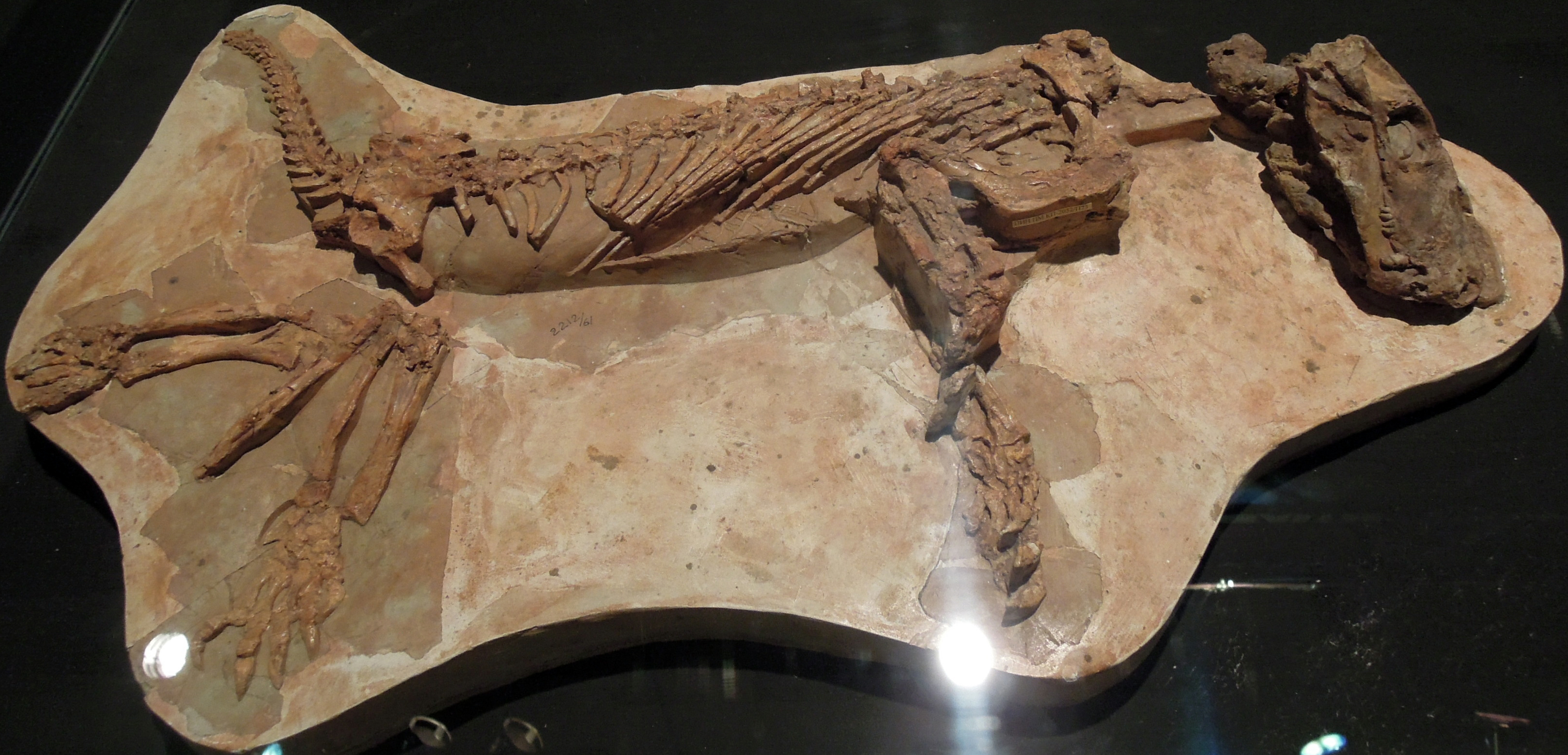
Holotype skeleton of Viatkogorgon, the most basal gorgonopsian behind Nochnitsa, and also from Kotelnich

In their 2018 paper, Kammerer and Masyutin stated that while the early evolution of Gorgonopsia is poorly understood, Nochnitsa and ''Viatkogorgon expand the knowledge of gorgonopsians from the middle Permian or earliest late Permian of Laurasia, the northern landmass of the supercontinent Pangaea, consisting of what is now Eurasia and North America. In their phylogenetic analysis, Nochnitsa was found to be the basalmost (earliest-diverging) gorgonopsian followed by Viatkogorgon, based on several plesiomorphic characters such as a low mandibular symphysis, a low and sloping posterior dentary resembling that of therocephalians, a reflected lamina located near the jaw articulation, the absence of a "cross-bar" on its surface, and an elongated tooth row. All these characteristics are absent in more derived genera, which fall outside a clade encompassing all other gorgonopsians. This group is in turn divided into two clades, one consisting of Russian and the other consisting of African gorgonopsians, based on shared skull features.

The following cladogram showing the position of Nochnitsa within Gorgonopsia follows Macungo et al. (2026):

- Gorgonopsia
  - Nochnitsa
  - - Viatkogorgon
    - - "Russian clade"
        - Suchogorgon
        - - Sauroctonus
          - - Pravoslavlevia
            - Inostrancevia
      - "African clade"
        - - Eriphostoma
          - - Gorgonops
            - - Jirahgorgon
              - Phorcys
        - - Cynariops
          - - Lycaenops
            - - - Arctops
                - - DA21/17-01-01
                    (Port des Canonge Fm. gorgonopsian)
                  - Smilesaurus
              - - Arctognathus
                - Rubidgeinae

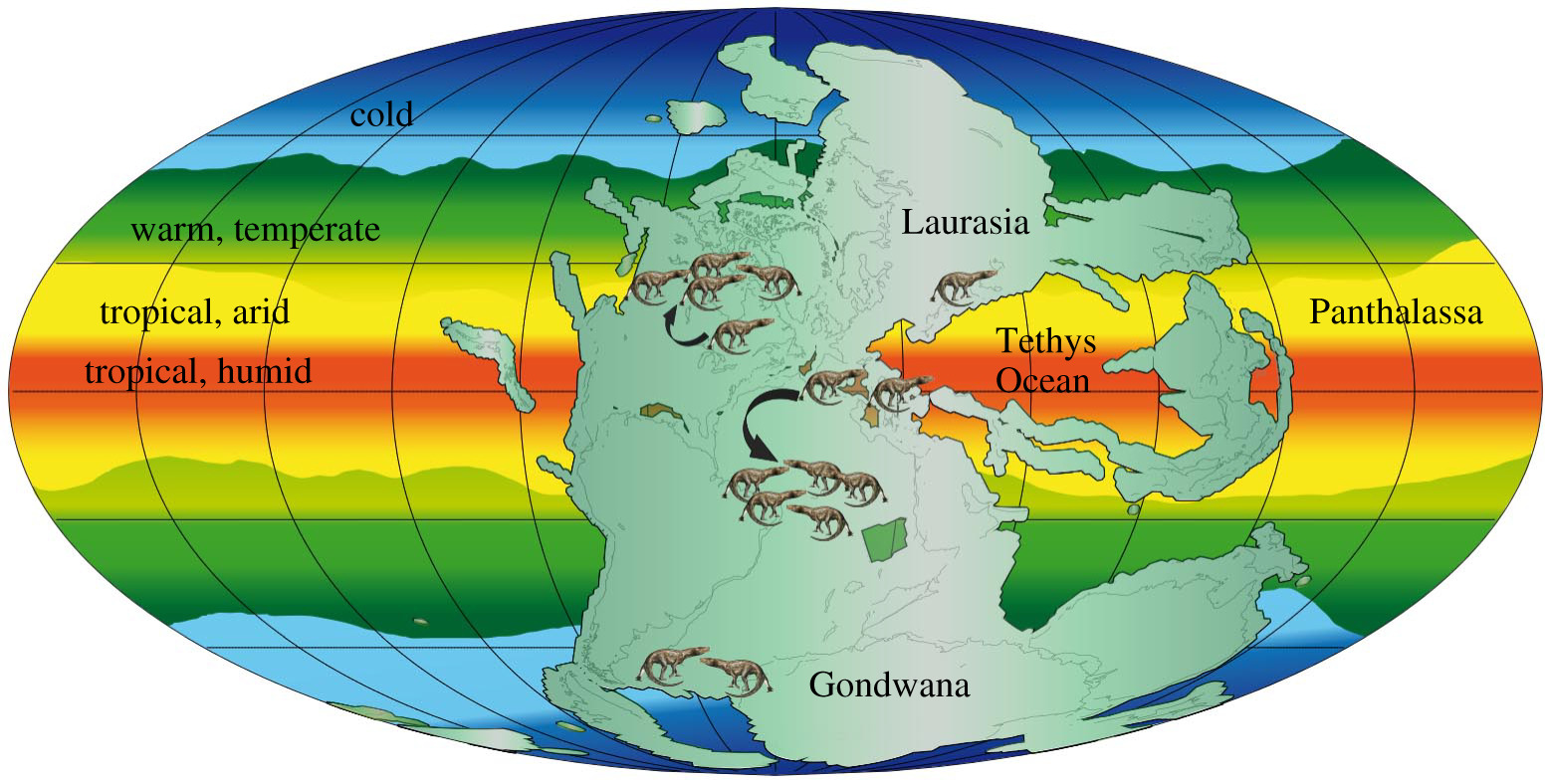
Map of the supercontinent Pangaea, showing the northern landmass Laurasia above, where Nochnitsa and other Russian gorgonopsians lived

In contrast, previous analyses had not found gorgonopsians to be grouped geographically, with some studies placing Russian genera such as Inostrancevia in African families. Kammerer and Masyutin found it surprising since there were many Russo-African sister taxon relationships between other therapsid groups, dicynodonts and burnetiamorphs in particular. This indicated there had been an extensive dispersal of coeval therapsid groups between continents. They cautioned that the paleobiogeography of tetrapod animals (ancestrally four-limbed vertebrates) during the Permian remained poorly understood, with the expected dispersal abilities of various therapsid groups often differing from what can be seen in the fossil record and suggested more research was needed.

Kammerer and Masyutin noted that while Nochnitsa and Viatkogorgon added to gorgonopsian diversity of the Kotelnich fauna, the group remained less rich in species than the therocephalians there. The low diversity and small size of the gorgonopsians there indicated that the assemblage of therapids was similar to that seen in the Pristerognathus Assemblage Zone in the Karoo Basin, South Africa, prior to the main round of gorgonopsian diversification there. In this regard, they found the basal position of Nochnitsa and Viatkogorgon intriguing, though they did not find it indicative of the Kotelnich locality being of an earlier age than the middle Permian South African strata that bear gorgonopsian fossils, based on the other kinds of therapid groups found among those faunas. They stated that while the "Russian clade" of gorgonopsians had probably diverged by the time the Kotelnich fauna existed, the absence of that clade in this locality suggests it had not yet undergone substantial diversification in Russia, and only became the dominant group of therapsid predators in the region later.

== Paleobiology ==
The Russian paleontologist Valeriy K. Golubev examined assemblages of Permian land vertebrates in Eastern Europe in 2000. He noted that the gorgonopsian Viatkogorgon and the therocephalian Viatkosuchus, the largest predators of the Kotelnich Subassemblage, were relatively small, not much different in size from the smaller predators of their assemblage, such as the therocephalians Scalopodon, Scalopodontes and Kotelcephalon. In 2019, the Russian paleontologists Yulia A. Suchkova and Golubev stated that the therocephalian Gorynychus from Kotelnich would have shared its niche as a dominant predator with Viatkogorgon. All these taxa nevertheless possess skulls larger than that of Nochnitsa, suggesting that it occupied a more limited predatory niche than its contemporaries.

== Paleoenvironment ==
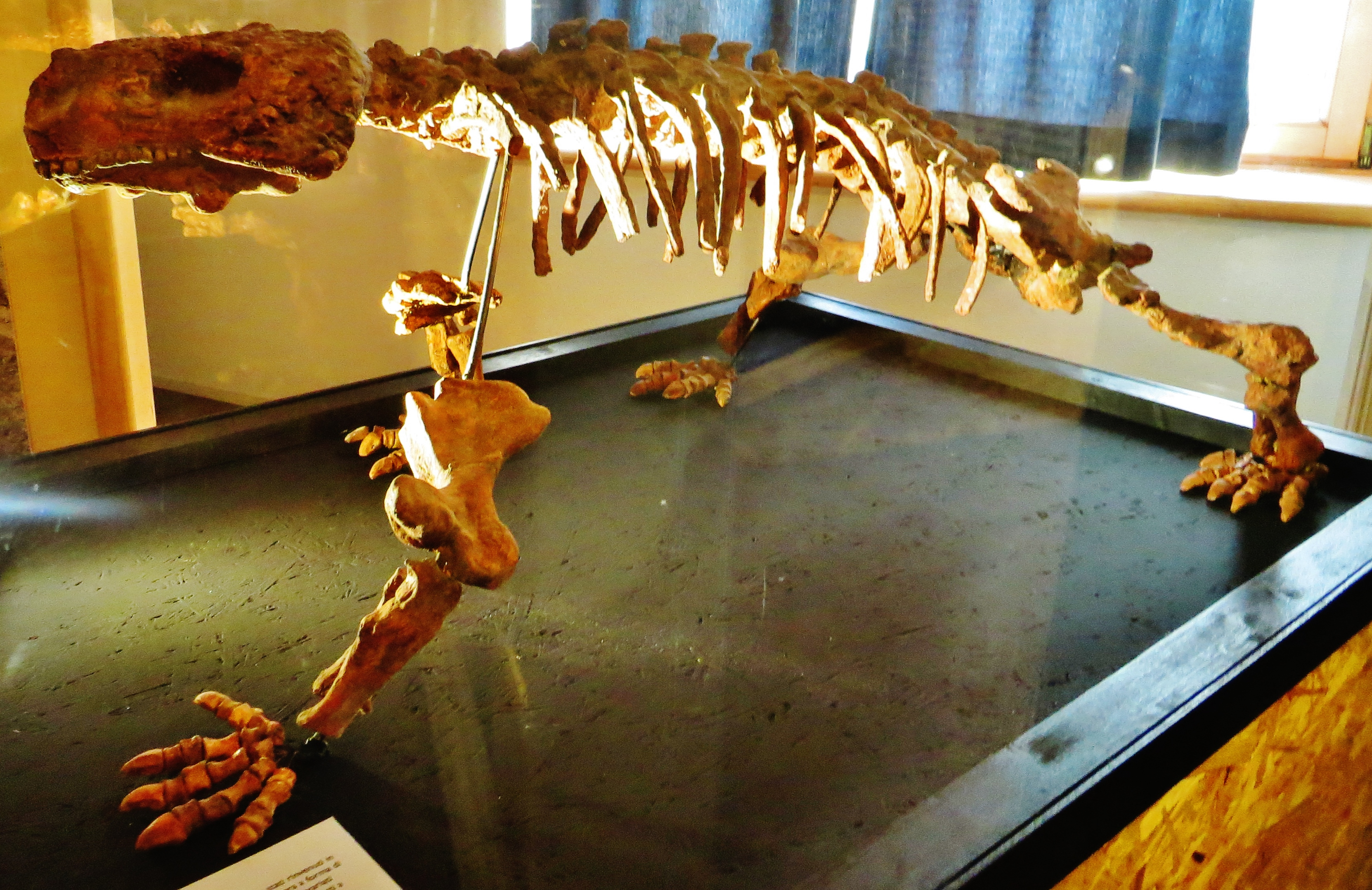
Skeleton of the pareiasaur Deltavjatia, which is very abundant at the Kotelnich locality

Nochnitsa is known from the Kotelnich locality, which consists of a series of Permian red bed exposures along the banks of the Vyatka River in Russia. It is specifically from the Vanyushonki Member, which is the oldest rock unit in the Kotelnich succession, consisting of pale or brown mudstones (clay and silts, with some fine-grained sand) as well as gray mudstone, and dark red mudstone at the base of this exposure. These mudstones were possibly deposited from suspension in standing water bodies on floodplains or shallow ephemeral lakes, that remained flooded for short periods of time, but the exact environment has not yet been determined, due to the lack of a primary structure of the sediments. The abundance of fossil rootlets and large herbivores indicates the landscape represented by the Vanyushonki Member was relatively humid and well-vegetated. The Kotelnich faunal complex was possibly coeval (of the same age) with the Lycosuchus-Eunotosaurus Subzone (formerly known as the Pristerognathus Assemblage Zone) of South Africa, which dates to either the latest Capitanian of the Middle Permian to the earliest Wuchiapingian of the Late Permian roughly 260-258 million years ago.

The Vanyushonki Member is the source of most of the tetrapod fossils from the Kotelnich locality, with skeletal remains being abundant here, often consisting of complete, articulated skeletons. Apart from the gorgonopsians Nochnitsa and Viatkogorgon, therapsids from the locality include the anomodont Suminia and the therocephalians Chlynovia, Gorynychus, Karenites, Perplexisaurus, Scalopodon, Scalopodontes, and Viatkosuchus. Parareptiles such as the pareiasaur Deltavjatia are particularly abundant there, and the nycteroleterid Emeroleter is present. Fossil ostracods, root traces, and tree stumps have also been found.

== See also ==
- Viatkogorgon
