= Lycideops =

Lycideops Temporal range: Late Permian

Scientific classification
- Kingdom: Animalia
- Phylum: Chordata
- Clade: Synapsida
- Clade: Therapsida
- Clade: †Therocephalia
- Family: †Lycideopidae
- Genus: †Lycideops; Broom, 1931

Type species
- †Lycideops longiceps Broom, 1931

Genus of therapsids from the Late Permian of South Africa

Lycideops is an extinct genus of therocephalians from the Late Permian of South Africa. The type species is Lycideops longiceps, named in 1931 by South African paleontologist Robert Broom. Fossils of Lycideops come from the Dicynodon Assemblage Zone of the Beaufort Group. Lycideops is a member of the family Lycideopidae. Like other lycideopids, Lycideops has a long snout.

== Phylogeny ==
Lycideops has been included in several phylogenetic analyses, including those of Huttenlocker (2009), Huttenlocker et al. (2011), and Sigurdsen et al. (2012). All place Lycideops within the advanced therocephalian clade Baurioidea. Huttenlocker (2009) and Huttenlocker et al. (2011) found it to group with Regisaurus and Scaloposaurus as shown in the cladogram below:

- Baurioidea
  - Ictidosuchus
  - - Ictidosuchops
    - - Ictidosuchoides
      - - - Lycideops
          - - Regisaurus
            - Scaloposaurus
        - - Tetracynodon
          - - Ericiolacerta
            - Bauria

The analysis of Sigurdsen et al. (2012) came to a different result, grouping Lycideops with Tetracynodon and Choerosaurus. The clade including these three genera was called Lycideopidae, and Lycideops was the most basal member of the group. Characteristics that unite Lycideops with Tetracynodon and Choerosaurus include the presence of five incisors on each side of the lower jaw (a derived characteristic given that most other eutherocephalians have four), a lacrimal bone that touches the nasal bone, and a contact between the maxilla and the vomer in the palate. Below is a cladogram from the analysis:

- Baurioidea
  - Ictidosuchus primaevus
  - Ictidosuchops rubidgei
  - Ictidosuchoides longiceps
  - Regisaurus jacobi
  - Scaloposaurus constrictus
  - Ericiolacerta parva
  - Bauriidae
  - Lycideopidae
    - Lycideops longiceps
    - - Choerosaurus dejageri
      - - Tetracynodon tenuis
        - Tetracynodon darti
