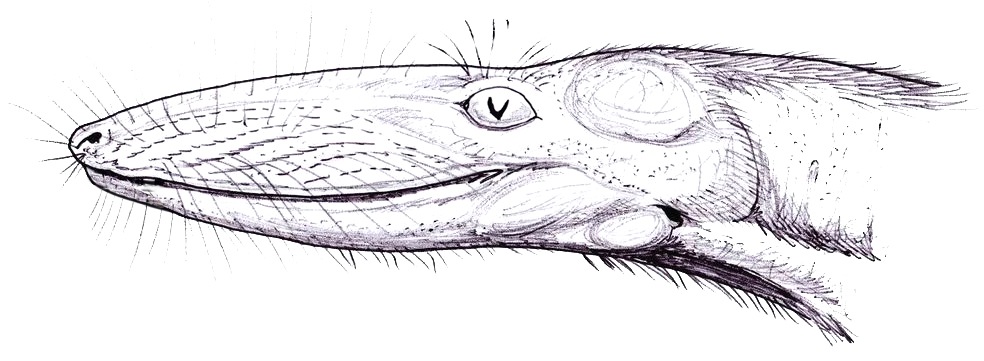

Scientific classification
- Kingdom: Animalia
- Phylum: Chordata
- Clade: Synapsida
- Clade: Therapsida
- Clade: †Therocephalia
- Family: †Lycideopidae
- Genus: †Tetracynodon; Broom and Robinson, 1948

Species
- †T. tenuis Broom and Robinson, 1948; †T. darti Sigogneau, 1963

= Tetracynodon =

Tetracynodon Temporal range: Late Permian - Early Triassic

Extinct genus of therapsids from Early Triassic South Africa

Tetracynodon is an extinct genus of therocephalian. Fossils of Tetracynodon have been found in the Karoo Basin of South Africa. Two species are known: the type species T. tenuis from the Late Permian and the species T. darti from the Early Triassic. Both species were small-bodied and probably fed on insects and small vertebrates. Although Tetracynodon is more closely related to mammals than to reptiles, its braincase is very primitive and more resembles that of modern amphibians and reptiles than of mammals.

== Palaeobiology ==
Tetracynodon was one of the few therapsid genera known to have survived the Permian-Triassic extinction event. Aside from Tetracynodon, the only therocephalian genera known from both sides of the Permian-Triassic boundary are Moschorhinus, Ictidosuchoides and Promoschorhynchus. The Triassic species Tetracynodon darti would have been part of the extinction's survivor fauna, a low-diversity community of therapsids and other land vertebrates. The Triassic species Tetracynodon darti is relatively small compared to Permian baurioids. This may be a possible example of the Lilliput effect in which small species are more common immediately after a mass extinction.

The manus of Tetracynodon displays significant adaptations for scratch-digging, which suggests that as in many other survivors of the Permian-Triassic extinction, burrowing was a survival strategy for this genus that enabled it to weather the exceptionally severe environmental cataclysms associated with the extinction event.

== Phylogeny ==
Tetracynodon was once classified among a group of therocephalians called scaloposaurids, all characterized by their very small size. Scaloposauridae is no longer recognized as a valid group because many scaloposaurid features are now thought to be characteristics of juvenile individuals rather than evidence of close evolutionary relationships.

In 2008, Tetracynodon tenuis was proposed to be a juvenile of the larger therocephalian Lycideops, which is known from the same Late Permian strata. Since T. tenuis is the type species of Tetracynodon and the type species of Lycideops, L. longiceps, was named earlier than T. tenuis, the species would be a synonym of Lycideops longiceps and the genus Tetracynodon would be invalid. Moreover, since the study found that Lycideops was not directly related to the Early Triassic Tetracynodon darti, it suggested that this lineage of therocephalians did not survive uninterrupted past the Permo-Triassic extinction event.

Tetracynodon was included in a phylogenetic analysis of therocephalians in 2012 and was placed in clade Baurioidea along with many other prior scaloposaurids. It was found to nest in a smaller clade with Lycideops and Choerosaurus, designated as the family Lycideopidae. Tetracynodon tenuis and T. darti were found to be sister taxa, meaning that they were a valid phylogenetic grouping and T. tenuis could not be a juvenile of Lycideops. Below is a cladogram from the study:

- Therapsida
  - Biarmosuchus tener
  - Titanophoneus potens
  - - Gorgonopsia
    - - Anomodontia
      - Eutheriodontia
        - Cynodontia
          - Charassognathus gracilis
          - - Dvinia prima
            - Procynosuchus delaharpeae
        - Therocephalia
          - Lycosuchus vanderrieti
          - - Glanosuchus macrops
            - Ictidosaurus angusticeps
            - Pristerognathus polyodon
          - Eutherocephalia
            - - Euchambersia mirabilis
              - - Promoschorhynchus platyrhinus
                - Olivierosuchus parringtoni
              - - Cerdops burgheri
                - Moschorhinus kitchingi
            - - Ictidostoma hemburyi
              - Hofmeyria atavus
              - Mirotenthes digitipes
              - - Viatkosuchus sumini
                - - Moschowhaitsia vjuschkovi
                  - Theriognathus microps
              - Baurioidea
                - Ictidosuchus primaevus
                - Ictidosuchops rubidgei
                - Ictidosuchoides longiceps
                - Regisaurus jacobi
                - Scaloposaurus constrictus
                - Ericiolacerta parva
                - Bauriidae
                - Lycideopidae
                  - Lycideops longiceps
                  - - Choerosaurus dejageri
                    - - Tetracynodon tenuis
                      - Tetracynodon darti
