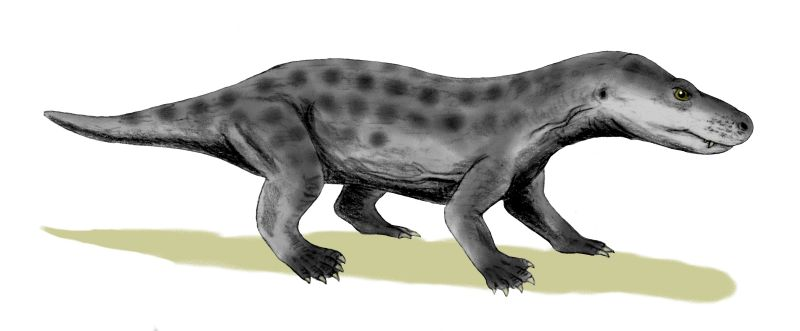
- Ericiolacerta parva

Scientific classification
- Kingdom: Animalia
- Phylum: Chordata
- Clade: Synapsida
- Clade: Therapsida
- Clade: †Therocephalia
- Family: †Ericiolacertidae
- Genus: †Ericiolacerta; Watson, 1931
- Species: †E. parva

Binomial name
- †Ericiolacerta parva Watson, 1931

= Ericiolacerta =

Ericiolacerta Temporal range: Early Triassic ~251–249 Ma

Extinct genus of therapsid from the early Triassic

Ericiolacerta is an extinct genus of small therocephalian therapsids from the early Triassic of South Africa and Antarctica. Ericiolacerta, meaning "hedgehog lizard" (from the Latin ericius, "hedgehog" and lacerta, "lizard"), was named by D. M. S. Watson in 1931. The species E. parva is known from the holotype specimen which consists of a nearly complete skeleton found in the Lystrosaurus Assemblage Zone within the Katberg Formation of the Beaufort Group in South Africa, and from a partial jaw found in the Lower Triassic Fremouw Formation in Antarctica. Ericiolacerta was around 20 centimetres (7.9 in) in length, with long limbs and relatively small teeth. It probably ate insects and other small invertebrates. The therocephalians—therapsids with mammal-like heads—were abundant in Permian times, but only a few made it into the Triassic. Ericiolacerta was one of those. It is possible that they gave rise to the cynodonts, the only therapsid group to survive into post-Triassic times. Cynodonts gave rise to mammals.

== Discovery ==
The Ericiolacerta holotype specimen Ericiolacerta parva was discovered in 1931 in the Katberg Formation of the Beaufort Group near Harrismith, Free State in South Africa and described by Professor David Meredith Seares Watson in an article for the Zoological Society of London. It was discovered by A. W. Putterill within a cornerstone block of limestone from the shales of the Lystrosaurus Assemblage Zone, placing it between ~251 and ~249 Ma during the early Triassic. The specimen consisted of a nearly complete skeleton with a slightly crushed skull. Watson described it as being closely related to the Therocephalian Scaloposaurus based on their skull morphology but as a new member of the family Scaloposauridae founded by Broom in 1914 based on differences in its dentition and jaw structure. This classification was later changed as this family was invalidated and many of its members were moved into the superfamily Baurioidea.

Another specimen was discovered in 1971 in the Lower Triassic Fremouw Formation of the Transantarctic Mountains in Antarctica near the McGregor and Shackleton glaciers and described in 1981 by Edwin H. Colbert and James W. Kitching. They described an associated mandibular ramus and pterygoids, and the hindlimbs of an Ericiolacerta parva specimen based on similarities in jaw structure, dentition, and foot structure to the Watson specimen from Africa. This diagnosis was later revised in Huttenlocker & Sidor (2012), in which the hind limbs were reevaluated as belonging to an indeterminate Eutherocephalian, and the mandibular ramus and pterygoids were confirmed as likely belonging to Ericiolacerta parva. The discovery of this species and others such as Lystrosaurus within both the African Lystrosaurus zone and the Antarctic Fremouw Formation lends more evidence to the fact that these continents were previously congruent as presented in Elliot et al. (1970).

== Description ==
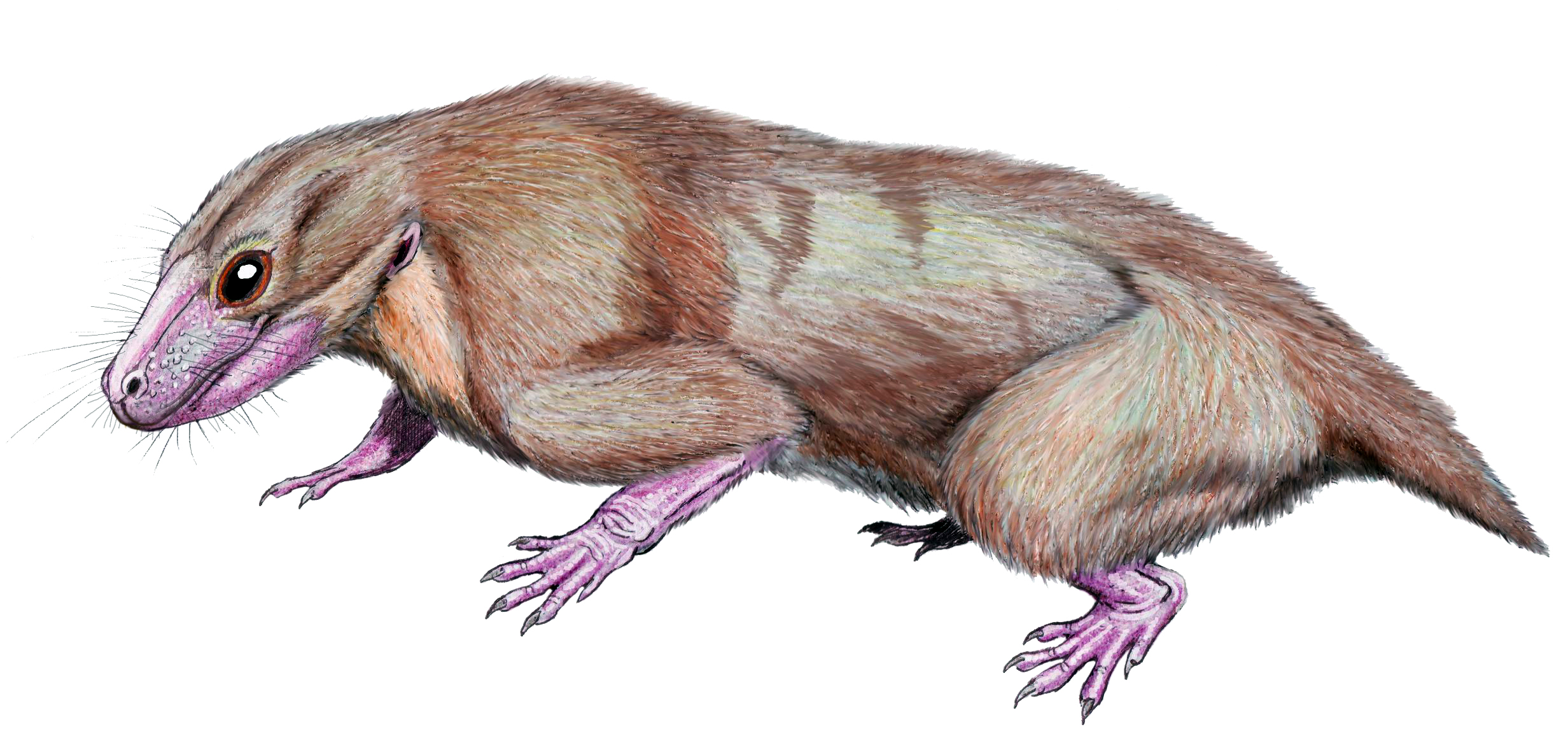
Restoration showing fur

Ericiolacerta parva was described as a small, fossilized reptile preserved extremely well, despite the skull being partially crushed before it was buried, resulting in distortion of the occipital, otic, and mandibular bones, as well as the loss of part of the premaxillae and zygoma. The specimen is also missing twelve vertebrae from its midsection, but besides these the skeleton is completely preserved. The curled position of the skeleton is similar to that assumed by many small mammals when they die, and the displacement of the bones was determined to be as a result of the movement and rotting of still-attached skin. The cause of the fractured skull was attributed to a larger animal likely stepping on the body. The specimen's total length from snout to the hind end of the pelvis was measured to be 17 centimetres (6.7 in). It was notable for the small size and irregularity of its teeth, the reduction/lack of canine teeth, the large size of its head and pectoral girdle compared to its relatively small pelvic girdle, and its long, slender limbs. By comparison, the Antarctic mandible from 1981 was described as being from a larger Ericiolacerta parva specimen, but maintained the small tooth size, irregularity, and reduced canines seen in the dentition of the African specimen. Both specimens demonstrate a slender dentary with a smooth, rounded ventral margin, which was determined by Huttenlocker & Sidor (2012) to be a compelling apomorphy in diagnosing the species. The presence of a tuber calcis on the posterior side of the calcaneum in the specimen was revised as a poor character in assigning Ericiolacerta parva and was used to reevaluate the hindlimbs of the Antarctic specimen as belonging to an indeterminate Eutherocephalian.

== Paleobiology ==
As a member of the Therocephalia sub-order within the Theriodont group, Ericiolacerta would have had much more in common with the cynodonts which gave rise to mammals than with other Theriodonts such as Gorgonopsids. Some evidence has suggested Therocephalia may represent a polyphyletic group with some species being more closely related to cynodonts than others, and a uniting clade called Eutheriodontia has been proposed. Most modern studies, however, consider Therocephalia to be a monophyletic group. Ericiolacerta shared many traits common in more basal Theriodonts as well as in mammals. Their small size similar to cynodonts may imply a burrowing lifestyle, and unlike other Therocephalians they possessed a secondary palate which may have aided in breathing while eating or in endothermy. The skull also possessed wide, slender zygomatic arches and postorbitals which failed to connect with the zygoma, all features also present in more derived cynodonts which likely aided in muscle attachment for chewing. Conversely, unlike other Theriodonts Ericiolacerta did not possess a free upstanding coronoid process on the dentary which would also have aided in connecting muscle fibers. It also did not experience the reduction of the lumbar ribs seen in members of Cynodontia, which is hypothesized to have evolved to increase their aerobic capacity. This would suggest that like other basal Theriodonts Ericiolacerta did not possess a transverse diaphragm. The holotype fossil described by Watson had its sternum only partially exposed, making determining if Ericiolacerta had evolved the segmented sternebrae seen in some Gorgonopsians difficult. This synapomorphy has been linked to evolutionary developments in locomotion and respiration towards the "mammalian-type" condition. This, combined with the long length of its limbs relative to its size implies Ericiolacerta had a more sprawling stance and reptilian gait than more derived cynodonts. Little holes in the snout area of the skull suggest that perhaps the snout had developed sense organs, like whiskers. A palate in the roof of the mouth separated the breathing passage from the eating area. This suggests an efficient eating mechanism that may indicate a warm-blooded lifestyle.

== Paleoenvironment ==
Ericiolacerta parva appears in the Lystrosaurus Biozone in South Africa, as well as the lower Fremouw in Antarctica during the Triassic. The Antarctic environment during the Triassic in the Fremouw Formation has been reconstructed containing dense forested areas located along riverbanks and floodplains. These forests contained a dense layer of Dicroidium leaflitter and existed as far south as ~70–75°. Analysis of fossilized trees and plant matter by Cúneo et al. (2003) determined that Antarctica experienced very favorable seasons of plant growth and described evidence of a cooling climate during the Late Triassic which the Antarctic ecosystem would be the first to respond to due to its high latitude. These conditions created an environment that was ripe for speciation, resulting in an explosion of diversity in the region. Studies of species such as Ericiolacerta which have been found in both the Karoo Basin of South Africa and the Fremouw Formation in Antarctica have determined that several species first appeared in Antarctica before later appearing in South Africa, providing evidence towards Antarctica being a hotspot for speciation. In the early Triassic, African flora was rich. The vegetation was used as shelter and food for numerous insects Ericiolacerta fed on.

== Classification ==
Ericiolacerta belongs to the order Therocephalia within the clade Eutherocephalia, and placed in the superfamily Baurioidea in the Ericiolacertidae family. It was initially classified within the now-obsolete group Scaloposauria which is now considered to likely represent juvenile forms of various therocephalians, at which point Ericiolacerta was reclassified within Baurioidea. Below is a cladogram of Baurioidea adapted from Huttenlocker (2009) and Huttenlocker & Sidor (2012).

- Baurioidea
  - Ictidosuchus
  - Ictidosuchops
  - - Ictidosuchoides
    - - - Regisaurus
        - Scaloposaurus
      - Lycideops
      - Tetracynodon
      - - Ericiolacerta
        - Bauriidae

== See also ==
- List of therapsids
