= Muchia =

Muchia Temporal range: Late Permian

Scientific classification
- Domain: Eukaryota
- Kingdom: Animalia
- Phylum: Chordata
- Clade: Synapsida
- Clade: Therapsida
- Clade: †Therocephalia
- Subfamily: †Tetracynodontinae
- Genus: †Muchia; Ivakhnenko, 2011

Type species
- †M. microdenta Ivakhnenko, 2011

Extinct genus of therapsids from the Late Permian of Russia

Muchia is an extinct genus of therocephalian therapsids from the Late Permian of Russia. Fossils have been found in the Kotelnichsky District of Kirov Oblast. The type species M. microdenta was named in 2011. Muchia is known only from a fragment of the lower jaw, making its classification among therocephalians uncertain. It is thought to be within the subfamily Tetracynodontinae, part of the larger group Baurioidea. Other members of the group such as Tetracynodon and Malasaurus are known from more complete material, and have small elongated skulls. Muchia probably had a similar appearance to these therocephalians.
