= Homodontosaurus =

Homodontosaurus Temporal range: Late Permian

Scientific classification
- Kingdom: Animalia
- Phylum: Chordata
- Clade: Synapsida
- Clade: Therapsida
- Clade: †Therocephalia
- Superfamily: †Baurioidea
- Genus: †Homodontosaurus; Broom, 1949

Type species
- †Homodontosaurus kitchingi Broom, 1949

Extinct genus of therapsids

Homodontosaurus is an extinct genus of therocephalian therapsids from the Late Permian of South Africa. The type species Homodontosaurus kitchingi was named by South African paleontologist Robert Broom in 1949. Broom based his description on a small skull found in the Cistecephalus Assemblage Zone near Graaff-Reinet. The skull is very small, at about 55 millimetres (2.2 in) long and 20 millimetres (0.79 in) wide. Homodontosaurus has large eye sockets and an elongated snout. The lower jaw is long, thin, and curved. Numerous small teeth line the upper jaw and are long, pointed, and round in cross-section.

When he first named Homodontosaurus in 1949, Broom considered it to be a pelycosaur. He noted similarities between the skull of Homodontosaurus and that of the sphenacodontid Secodontosaurus from the Early Permian of Texas. Broom thought that Homodontosaurus was most closely related to a pelycosaur called Elliotsmithia, which he named in 1937 on the basis of the back half of a skull. In 1950, South African paleontologist A. S. Brink described a second specimen of Homodontosaurus, which included an articulated postrcranial skeleton. On the basis of this skeleton, paleontologists D. M. S. Watson and Alfred Romer reclassified it as a scaloposaurid therocephalian in 1956. Scaloposaurids are now recognized as an artificial grouping of the juvenile forms of many therocephalians. Homodontosaurus has even been considered the juvenile form of the larger therocephalian Tetracynodon. Homodontosaurus and most other scalopodontids are now classified as basal members of Baurioidea.
