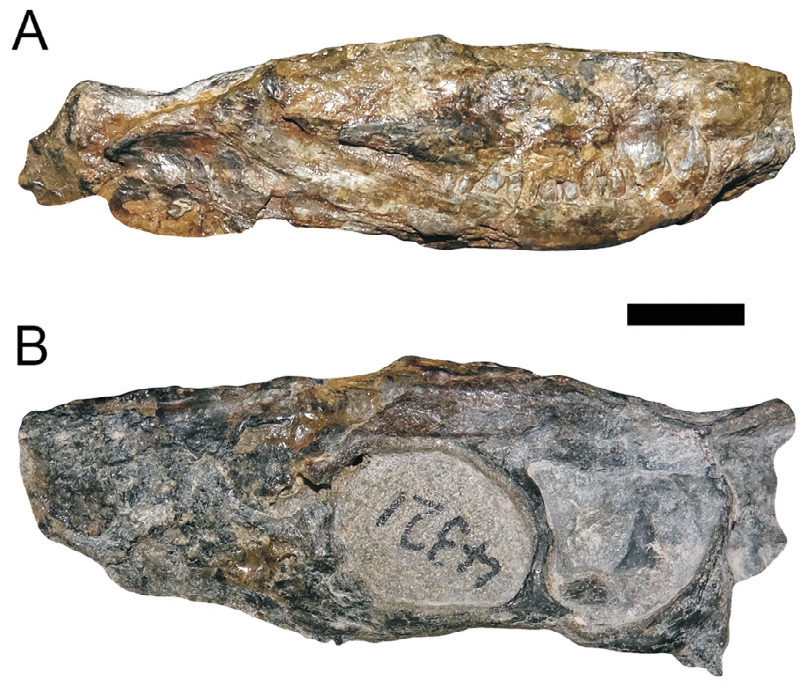
- Holotype skull

Scientific classification
- Domain: Eukaryota
- Kingdom: Animalia
- Phylum: Chordata
- Clade: Synapsida
- Clade: Therapsida
- Clade: †Therocephalia
- Family: †Scylacosauridae
- Genus: †Blattoidealestes; Boonstra, 1954 (nomen dubium)
- Species: †B. gracilis

Binomial name
- †Blattoidealestes gracilis Boonstra, 1954 (nomen dubium) (=Scylacosauridae indet)

= Blattoidealestes =

Blattoidealestes Temporal range: Middle Permian, Capitanian

Extinct genus of therapsid from Middle-Permian South Africa

Blattoidealestes is a dubious genus of therocephalian, an extinct therapsid from the Middle Permian of South Africa. The type species Blattoidealestes gracilis was named by South African paleontologist Lieuwe Dirk Boonstra from the Tapinocephalus Assemblage Zone in 1954. Dating back to the Middle Permian, Blattoidealestes is one of the oldest therocephalians. It is similar in appearance to the small therocephalian Perplexisaurus from Russia, and may be closely related.

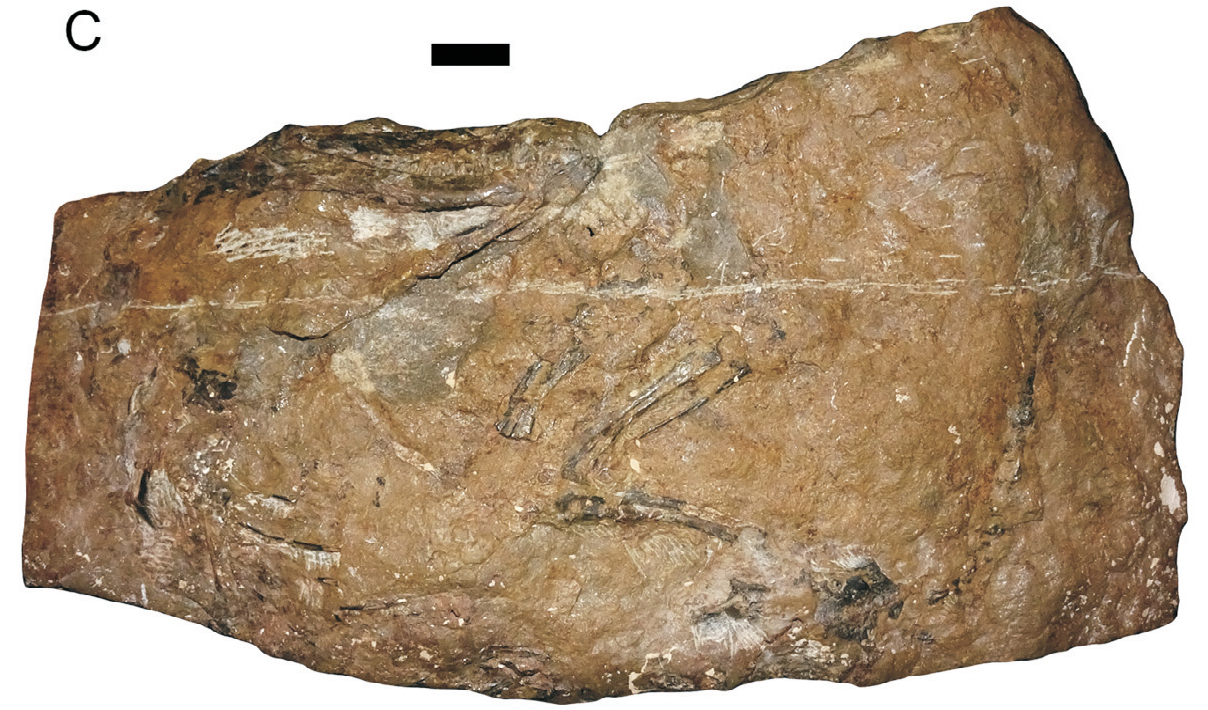
Holotype skeletal block

The holotype specimen of Blattoidealestes was discovered in 1918 in Prince Albert, Western Cape and cataloged as SAM 4321. SAM 4321 consists of a skull and partial postcranial skeleton. At around 55 millimetres (2.2 in), the skull is extremely small for a therocephalian. It was heavily distorted during fossilization and preparation, with the right side heavily eroded and most of the skull having been broken off from the main block. The snout is short and the eye sockets are very large. The lower jaw is slender, with a projection called the coronoid process very prominent. The skull bears many small teeth, including a pair of canines in the upper and lower jaws. Each postcanine tooth has lateral grooves on its surface, creating several small cusps. Cuspid teeth are common in Late Permian and Triassic therocephalians, and the closely related cynodonts, which are the ancestors of mammals, but no earlier theriodont possesses this type of tooth. Therefore, Blattoidealestes represents the oldest record of multicuspid teeth among theriodonts.

Although it is one of the earliest members of the group, Blattoidealestes was initially thought to be in a derived position among therocephalians. Due to its small size, Blattoidealestes was originally classified with other tiny therocephalians in a group called Scaloposauria. Scaloposauria has fallen out of use in recent years, and is now thought to represent a polyphyletic assemblage of juvenile therocephalians. Along with many other small-bodied "scaloposaurians", Blattoidealestes was later classified as a member of the advanced therocephalian clade Baurioidea. A revision of this specimen in 2023 determined that Blattoidealestes instead represents a juvenile scylacosaurid, one of the earliest divering clades of therocephalians. It is identifiable as an early therocephalian rather than a baurioid by having serrated canines, and its snout proportions identify it specifically as a scylacosaurid.
