= Yikezhaogia =

Yikezhaogia Temporal range: Early Triassic

Scientific classification
- Kingdom: Animalia
- Phylum: Chordata
- Clade: Synapsida
- Clade: Therapsida
- Clade: †Therocephalia
- Superfamily: †Baurioidea
- Genus: †Yikezhaogia; Li, 1984

Type species
- †Yikezhaogia megafenestrala Li, 1984

Genus of therapsids from the Early Triassic of China

Yikezhaogia is an extinct genus of therocephalian therapsids from the Early Triassic of Inner Mongolia (China). It is known from a single fragmentary skull and associated postcranial bones representing the species Yikezhaogia megafenestrala. It is identifiable as a therocephalian by its thin postorbital bar behind the eye socket, its elongated temporal opening behind the bar, and a thin lower jaw with a low coronoid process. Large tooth sockets in the upper jaw indicate that Yikezhaogia had large caniniform teeth. The teeth of the lower jaw are blunt-tipped and cylindrical. Although its exact position among therocephalians is uncertain, Yikezhaogia is probably a basal member of the group Baurioidea.
