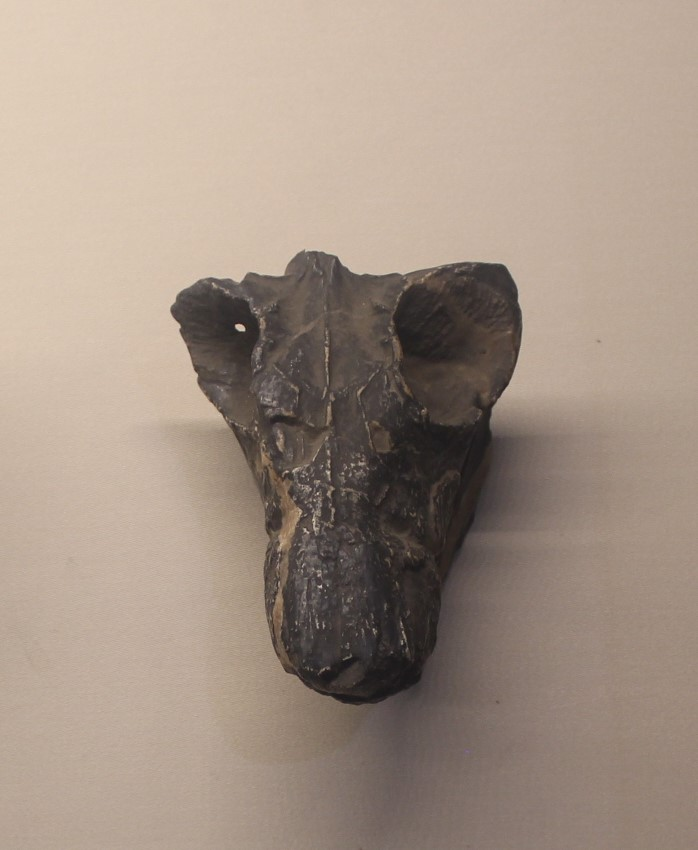
- Skull cast, Tianjin Natural History Museum

Scientific classification
- Domain: Eukaryota
- Kingdom: Animalia
- Phylum: Chordata
- Clade: Synapsida
- Clade: Therapsida
- Clade: †Therocephalia
- Family: †Regisauridae
- Genus: †Urumchia; Young, 1952

Type species
- †Urumchia lii Young, 1952

= Urumchia =

Urumchia Temporal range: Early Triassic

Extinct genus of therapsids from the Early Triassic of China

Urumchia is an extinct genus of therocephalian therapsids from the Early Triassic of China. The type species Urumchia lii was described by Chinese paleontologist C. C. Young (Yang Zhongjian) in 1952 from the Jiucaiyuan Formation in Xinjiang. The holotype skull has been lost, but Young was able to describe the species on the basis of a detailed cast of the skull. Urumchia is similar to the South African therocephalian Regisaurus in having an expanded pair of vomer bones on the underside of the skull that form a secondary palate. In Urumchia the front end of the vomers narrow to a point, while in Regisaurus they do not. Urumchia has six incisors on either side of the upper jaw, a primitive condition among baurioid therocephalians that usually have fewer incisors.
