= Jiucaiyuangnathus =

Jiucaiyuangnathus Temporal range: Early Triassic

Scientific classification
- Kingdom: Animalia
- Phylum: Chordata
- Clade: Synapsida
- Clade: Therapsida
- Clade: †Therocephalia
- Superfamily: †Baurioidea
- Genus: †Jiucaiyuangnathus; Liu and Abdala, 2024

Type species
- Jiucaiyuangnathus confusus Liu and Abdala, 2024

Extinct genus of therapsids

Jiucaiyuangnathus is a genus of baurioid therocephalian that lived in China during the Early Triassic. It is a monotypic genus; its type species is J. confusus.

== Description ==
All known specimens of J. confusus are juveniles. The autapomorphies of the species are maxillary palatal process contacting the vomer and the premaxillary vomerine process and the presence of five to six maxillary incisors per dental quadrant.

== Distribution ==
J. confusus is known from the Jiucaiyuan Formation of Xinjiang, China.
