= Scaloporhinus =

Scientific classification
- Kingdom: Animalia
- Phylum: Chordata
- Clade: Synapsida
- Clade: Therapsida
- Clade: †Therocephalia
- Family: †Scaloposauridae
- Genus: †Scaloporhinus
- Species: †S. angulorugatus

Binomial name
- †Scaloporhinus angulorugatus Boonstra, 1953

Extinct genus of therapsids

Scaloporhinus is a genus of extinct therocephalian from the Permian of South Africa. It contains the single species S. angulorugatus. The species possesses a parietal foramen, a feature that is lost in many species of this group.
