= Scalopocephalus =

Scalopocephalus Temporal range: Late Permian

Scientific classification
- Domain: Eukaryota
- Kingdom: Animalia
- Phylum: Chordata
- Clade: Synapsida
- Clade: Therapsida
- Clade: †Therocephalia
- Superfamily: †Baurioidea
- Genus: †Scalopocephalus; Huene, 1938

Type species
- †Scalopocephalus watsonianus Huene, 1937

Extinct genus of therapsids from the Late Permian of South Africa

Scalopocephalus is an extinct genus of therocephalian therapsids from the Late Permian of South Africa. German paleontologist Friedrich von Huene discovered the holotype skull of Scalopocephalus from the Cistecephalus Assemblage Zone in 1924 and named the type species Scalopocephalus watsonianus in 1937. Scalopocephalus is similar in appearance to Scaloposaurus and was first classified in the family Scaloposauridae. Scaloposauridae is no longer recognized as a valid group, and Scalopocephalus is now classified as a basal member of Baurioidea.
