= Icticephalus =

Icticephalus Temporal range: Middle - Late Permian

Scientific classification
- Domain: Eukaryota
- Kingdom: Animalia
- Phylum: Chordata
- Clade: Synapsida
- Clade: Therapsida
- Clade: †Therocephalia
- Superfamily: †Baurioidea
- Genus: †Icticephalus; Broom, 1915

Type species
- †Icticephalus polycynodon Broom, 1915

Extinct genus of therapsids from Permian South Africa

Icticephalus is an extinct genus of therocephalian therapsids from the Middle and Late Permian of South Africa. The type species Icticephalus polycynodon was named from the Tapinocephalus Assemblage Zone by South African paleontologist Robert Broom in 1915. Specimens of Icticephalus have also been described from the Cistecephalus Assemblage Zone. Broom originally placed Icticephalus in the Scaloposauridae, a group of very small therocephalians. Most scaloposaurids are now thought to be juvenile forms of other therocephalians, and Scaloposauridae is no longer recognized as a valid grouping. Icticephalus and other former scaloposaurids are now classified as basal members of Baurioidea.
