= Chlynovia =

Chlynovia Temporal range: Late Permian

Scientific classification
- Kingdom: Animalia
- Phylum: Chordata
- Clade: Synapsida
- Clade: Therapsida
- Clade: †Therocephalia
- Family: †Ictidosuchidae
- Genus: †Chlynovia; Tatarinov 2000

Species
- C. serridentatus Tatarinov 2000 (type)

Extinct genus of therapsids from the Late Permian of Russia

Chlynovia is an extinct genus of therocephalian therapsids from the Late Permian of Russia. The type species is C. serridentatus, named in 2000. Chlynovia was originally classified within Scaloposauria, a group of therocephalians characterized by their small size and lightly built skulls. Scaloposaurians are no longer recognized as a true grouping, but instead represent the juvenile forms of many types of therocephalians. Chlynovia was placed in the family Perplexisauridae along with Perplexisaurus, but both therocephalians are now placed in the family Ictidosuchidae.

Chlynovia was found in the Urpalov Formation in the Kirov Oblast of Russia. Remains of Chlynovia have been found alongside pareiasaurs and therapsids in the Vanyushonkov Member. These animals make up what is known as the Kotelnich assemblage.
