= Ictidognathus =

Ictidognathus Temporal range: Late Permian ~259–254 Ma

Scientific classification
- Kingdom: Animalia
- Phylum: Chordata
- Clade: Synapsida
- Clade: Therapsida
- Clade: †Therocephalia
- Superfamily: †Baurioidea
- Genus: †Ictidognathus; Broom 1911

Species
- I. hemburyi Broom 1912; I. parvidens Broom 1911 (type)

Extinct genus of therapsids of Late Permian South Africa

Ictidognathus is an extinct genus of therocephalian therapsids that lived in South Africa during the Late Permian. Fossils are found in the Tropidostoma and Cistecephalus Assemblage Zones of the Beaufort Group in the Western Cape.

== See also ==
- List of therapsids
