= Ictidodon =

Ictidodon Temporal range: Late Permian

Scientific classification
- Domain: Eukaryota
- Kingdom: Animalia
- Phylum: Chordata
- Clade: Synapsida
- Clade: Therapsida
- Clade: †Therocephalia
- Superfamily: †Baurioidea
- Genus: †Ictidodon; Broom, 1925

Type species
- †Ictidodon agilis Broom, 1925

Extinct genus of therapsids from Permian South Africa

Ictidodon is an extinct genus of therocephalian therapsids from the Late Permian of South Africa. The type species Ictidodon agilis was named by South African paleontologist Robert Broom in 1925. Broom classified Ictidodon in the Scaloposauridae, a group of small-bodied therocephalians that are now thought to be juvenile forms of larger therocephalians. Ictidodon and many other scaloposaurids are now classified as basal members of the clade Baurioidea.
