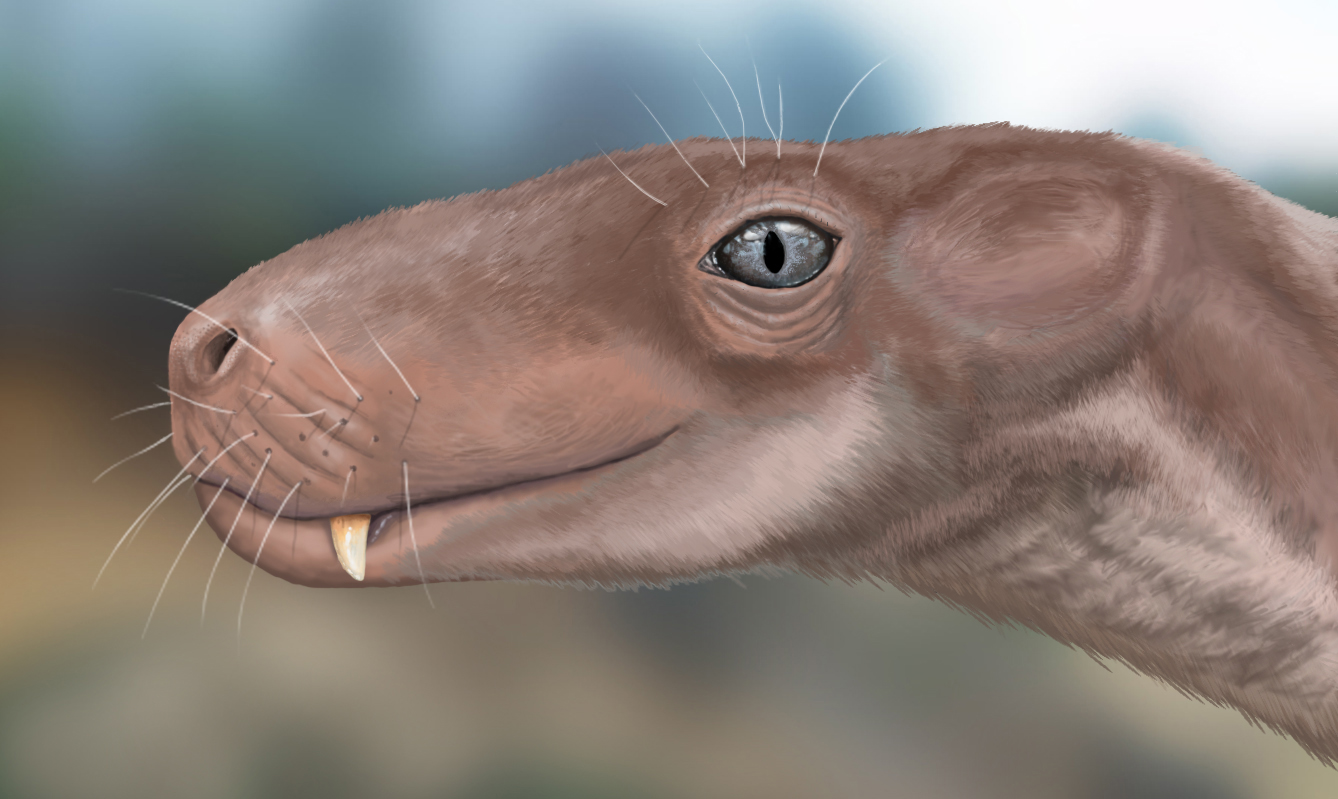
- Life restoration of Scalopodontes kotelnichi

Scientific classification
- Kingdom: Animalia
- Phylum: Chordata
- Clade: Synapsida
- Clade: Therapsida
- Clade: †Therocephalia
- Family: †Ictidosuchidae
- Genus: †Scalopodontes; Tatarinov 2000

Type species
- †S. kotelnichi Tatarinov 2000

= Scalopodontes =

Scalopodontes Temporal range: Late Permian ~259–256.8 Ma

Extinct genus of therapsid from Late Permian Russia

Scalopodontes is an extinct genus of therocephalian which existed in Russia during the Late Permian period. The type species is Scalopodontes kotelnichi. Fossils have been found in the Kotelnich assemblage.
