= Scalopolacerta =

Scientific classification
- Domain: Eukaryota
- Kingdom: Animalia
- Phylum: Chordata
- Clade: Synapsida
- Genus: †Scalopolacerta; Mendrez-Carroll, 1979

Extinct genus of therapsids

Scalopolacerta is an extinct genus of non-mammalian synapsids.

== See also ==
- List of therapsids
