= Scalopodon =

Scalopodon Temporal range: Late Permian, 260 Ma

Scientific classification
- Domain: Eukaryota
- Kingdom: Animalia
- Phylum: Chordata
- Clade: Synapsida
- Clade: Therapsida
- Clade: †Therocephalia
- Superfamily: †Baurioidea
- Genus: †Scalopodon; Tatarinov 1999

Type species
- †Scalopodon tenuisfrons Tatarinov 1999

Extinct genus of therapsids from the Late Permian of Russia

Scalopodon is an extinct genus of therocephalian therapsids from the Late Permian of Russia. The type species Scalopodon tenuisfrons was named in 1999 from the Kotelnichsky District of Kirov Oblast. Scalopodon is known from a single fragmentary holotype specimen including the back of the skull, the left side of the lower jaw and isolated postorbital and prefrontal bones. The skull was found in the Deltavjatia Assemblage Zone, which dates back to the early Wuchiapingian about 260 million years ago. Distinguishing features of Scalopodon include narrow frontal bones and a distinctive sagittal crest along the parietal region at the back of the skull. Scalopodon was originally classified in the family Scaloposauridae, and was the first scaloposaurid found in Russia (scaloposaurids are also known from southern Africa and Antarctica). More recent studies of therocephalians have found scaloposaurids like Scalopodon to be juvenile forms of larger therocephalians and do not consider Scaloposauridae to be a valid group. Scalopodon and most other scaloposaurids are now classified as basal members of Baurioidea.
