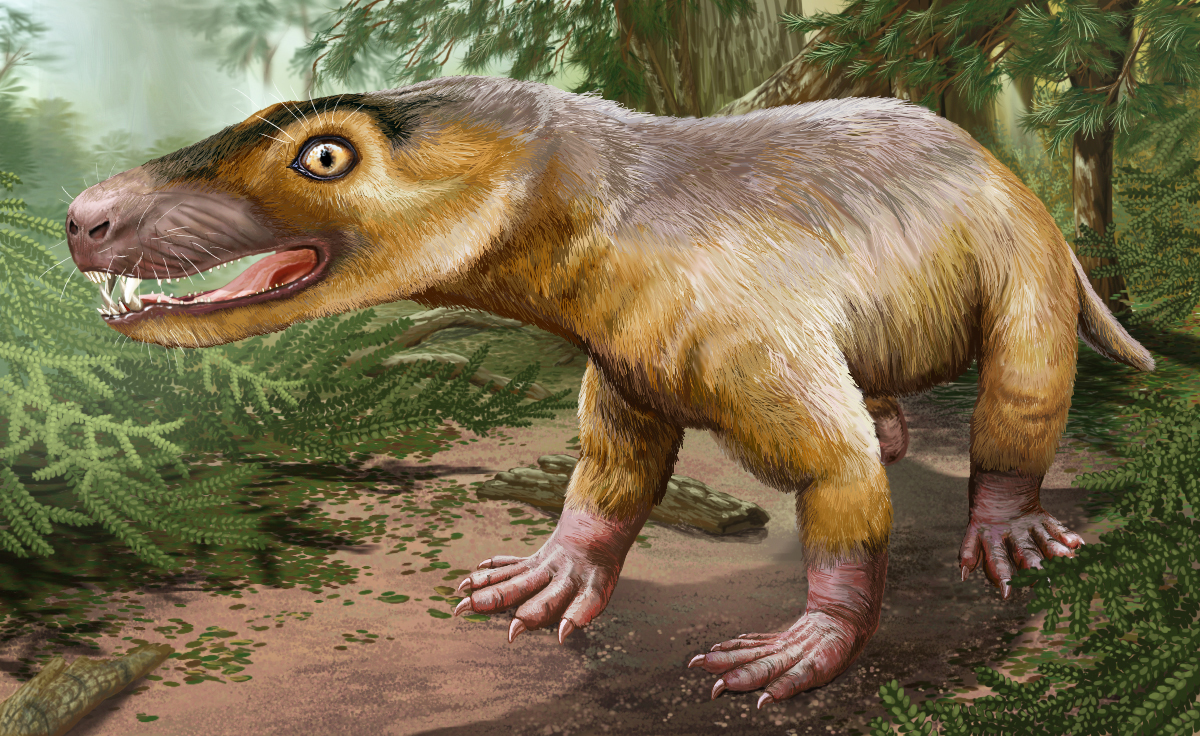
- Life restoration of Karenites ornamentatus

Scientific classification
- Kingdom: Animalia
- Phylum: Chordata
- Clade: Synapsida
- Clade: Therapsida
- Clade: †Therocephalia
- Family: †Karenitidae
- Genus: †Karenites; Tatarinov, 1995

Type species
- †Karenites ornamentatus Tatarinov, 1995

= Karenites =

Karenites Temporal range: Late Permian

Genus of therapsids from the Late Permian of Russia

Karenites is an extinct genus of therocephalian therapsids from the Late Permian of Russia. The only species is Karenites ornamentatus, named in 1995. Several fossil specimens are known from the town of Kotelnich in Kirov Oblast.

== Description ==
Karenites is known from a partial holotype skeleton, two partial skulls, and isolated jaw bones. Although incomplete, the skulls preserve small and delicate structures like nasal turbinates on the inside of the skull and the stapes bone of the ear. The skull of Karenites is about 10 centimetres (3.9 in) long, with the snout much longer than the temporal region of the skull behind the eye sockets. Viewed from above, the skull is triangular. The snout is broad, and the skull widens toward the occiput or posterior margin. Two large holes behind the eye socket called temporal fenestrae occupy most of the posterior skull. Between these fenestra is a narrow sagittal crest. In front of this crest, the skull roof bones are weakly pitted with small bumps and ridges for blood vessels. Some specimens include parts of the scleral ring, a ring of bone embedded in the eye.

On each side of the upper jaw are five incisors, two or three precanines, one canine, and eleven or twelve postcanines. The incisors and precanines are long, thin, and slightly curved, separated from each other by a small gap. The canine is much longer, projecting slightly forward from the tooth socket and curving backward along its length. The postcanine teeth are shorter and broader than the incisors and precanines. Toward the back of the skull the tips of the teeth flatten. The lower jaw is thin and curves upward to the arch of the cheek, except for a large coronoid process that extends to the articular-quadrate jaw joint at the back of the skull. The lower jaw has three small incisors angled slightly forward, a large canine tooth projecting upward, and thirteen small, blunt postcanine teeth. The farthest postcanine teeth have small secondary cusps behind their tips. These multicusped teeth may have been adaptations for crushing food, although they are not as well developed as the teeth of other therocephalians like Ericiolacerta.

In 1999, thoracic plates were reported to be present in the holotype of Karenites. Thoracic plates are plates of bone on the underside of the rib cage that are typically found in reptiles, and unusual for mammal relatives like therocephalians. This bone was later reinterpreted as an interclavicle, part of the pectoral girdle common to all early therapsids.

== Paleobiology ==
The presence of a scleral ring in Karenites may be an indication that it was aquatic. Pits on the skull have been interpreted as evidence for well-developed whiskers, which may have been used in hunting aquatic prey. Some therocephalians like Perplexisaurus have also been interpreted as aquatic predators, and share many similarities with Karenites. While these aquatic forms had strong sutures between cranial bones, which may have stabilized the skull when consuming large aquatic prey like fishes, Karenites had weaker, slightly movable skull joints associated with feeding on smaller terrestrial prey like insects. Its multicuspid teeth also suggest it fed on insects. Karenites has long limb bones that indicate a fully terrestrial rather than aquatic lifestyle.

Ridges on the inside of the skull of Karenites form a series of sinuses. These sinuses may have been associated with improvements in the sense of smell of therocephalians, but they are not thought to be olfactory structures.

Bony projections on the underside of the lower jaw of Karenites may have supported tissues that transmitted sound to the stapes bone in the ear. Early therapsids like Karenites lack the well-developed auditory system of mammals, which had evolved from a restructuring of bones in the back of the skull and the lower jaw, and probably had a poor sense of hearing. As an early stage in the development of the mammalian auditory system, Karenites may have been able to hear some sounds by placing its jaw on the ground to detect vibrations.
