= Dongusaurus =

Scientific classification
- Domain: Eukaryota
- Kingdom: Animalia
- Phylum: Chordata
- Clade: Synapsida
- Genus: †Dongusaurus; Vjuschkov, 1964

Extinct genus of therapsids

Dongusaurus is an extinct genus of therocephalian therapsids.

== See also ==
- List of therapsids
