= Malasaurus =

Malasaurus Temporal range: Late Permian

Scientific classification
- Kingdom: Animalia
- Phylum: Chordata
- Clade: Synapsida
- Clade: Therapsida
- Clade: †Therocephalia
- Genus: †Malasaurus; Tatarinov, 2002

Type species
- †M. germanus Tatarinov, 2002

Extinct genus of therapsids from Permian Russia

Malasaurus is an extinct genus of therocephalian therapsids which lived in south-eastern Finland and north-western Russia. The type species is Malasaurus germanus.
