= Ictidostoma =

Ictidostoma Temporal range: Wuchiapingian

Scientific classification
- Kingdom: Animalia
- Phylum: Chordata
- Clade: Synapsida
- Clade: Therapsida
- Clade: †Therocephalia
- Superfamily: †Whaitsioidea
- Genus: †Ictidostoma; Broom, 1930

Type species
- Ictidognathus hemburyi Broom, 1911

Extinct genus of synapsid from the late Permian of South Africa

Ictidostoma is an extinct genus of non-mammalian synapsids known from the Tropidostoma Assemblage Zone.

== See also ==
- List of therapsids
