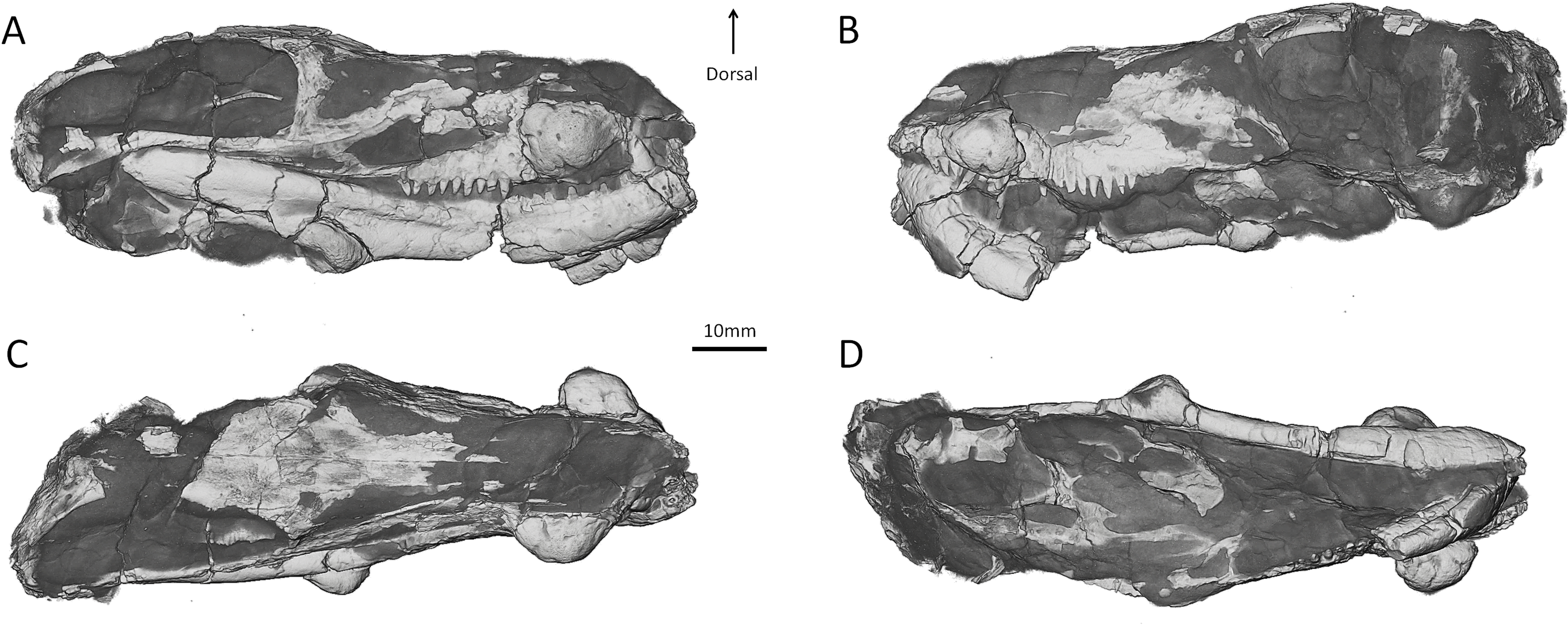
- 3D-rendered skull

Scientific classification
- Kingdom: Animalia
- Phylum: Chordata
- Clade: Synapsida
- Clade: Therapsida
- Clade: †Therocephalia
- Superfamily: †Baurioidea
- Genus: †Choerosaurus; Haughton, 1929

Type species
- †Choerosaurus dejageri Haughton, 1929

= Choerosaurus =

Choerosaurus Temporal range: Late Permian

Genus of therapsids from the Late Permian of South Africa

Choerosaurus is an extinct genus of therocephalian therapsids from the Late Permian of South Africa. The type species Choerosaurus dejageri was named by South African paleontologist Sidney H. Haughton from the Tropidostoma Assemblage Zone in 1929.

== Description ==
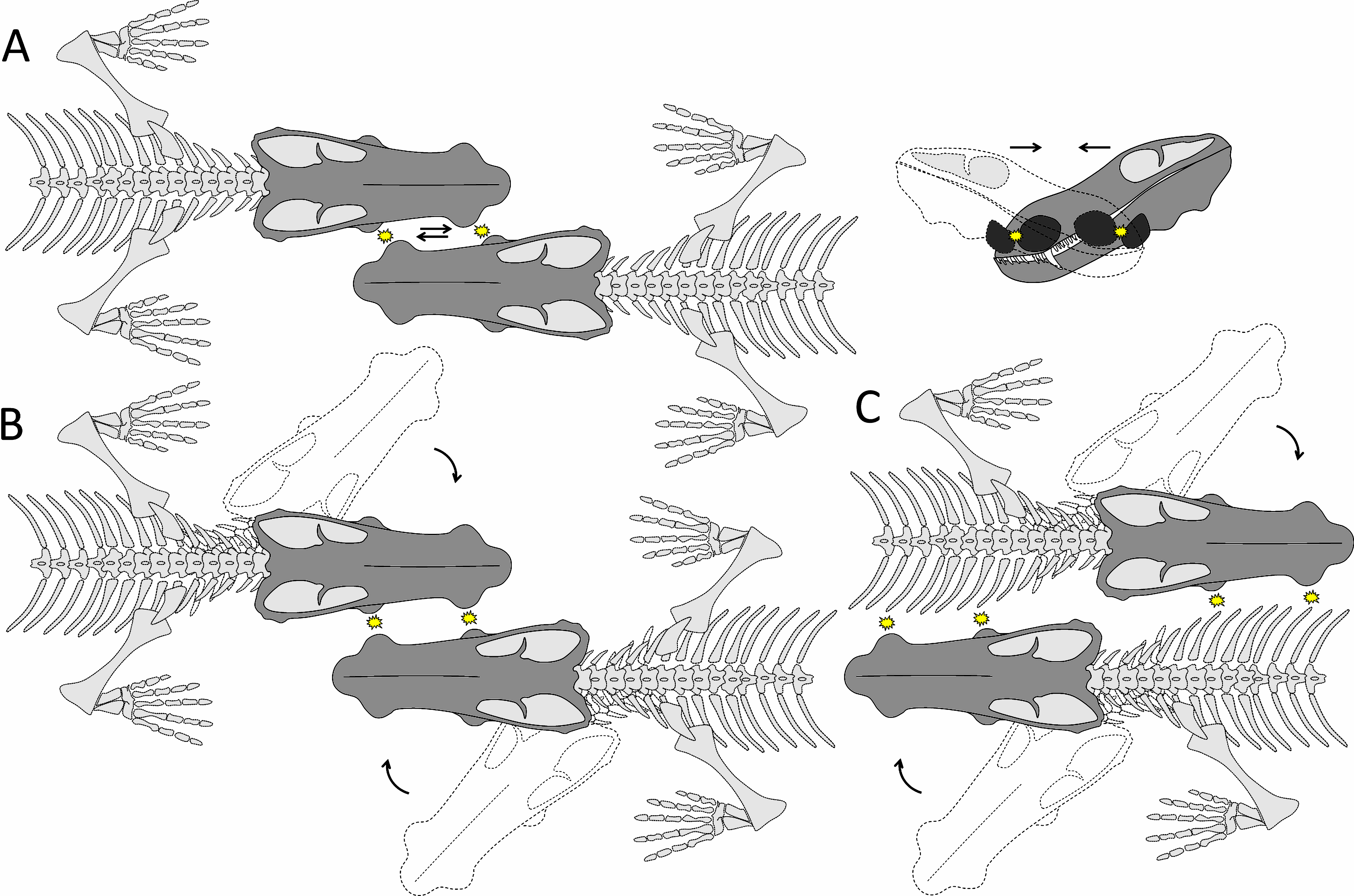
Hypothesized types of fighting

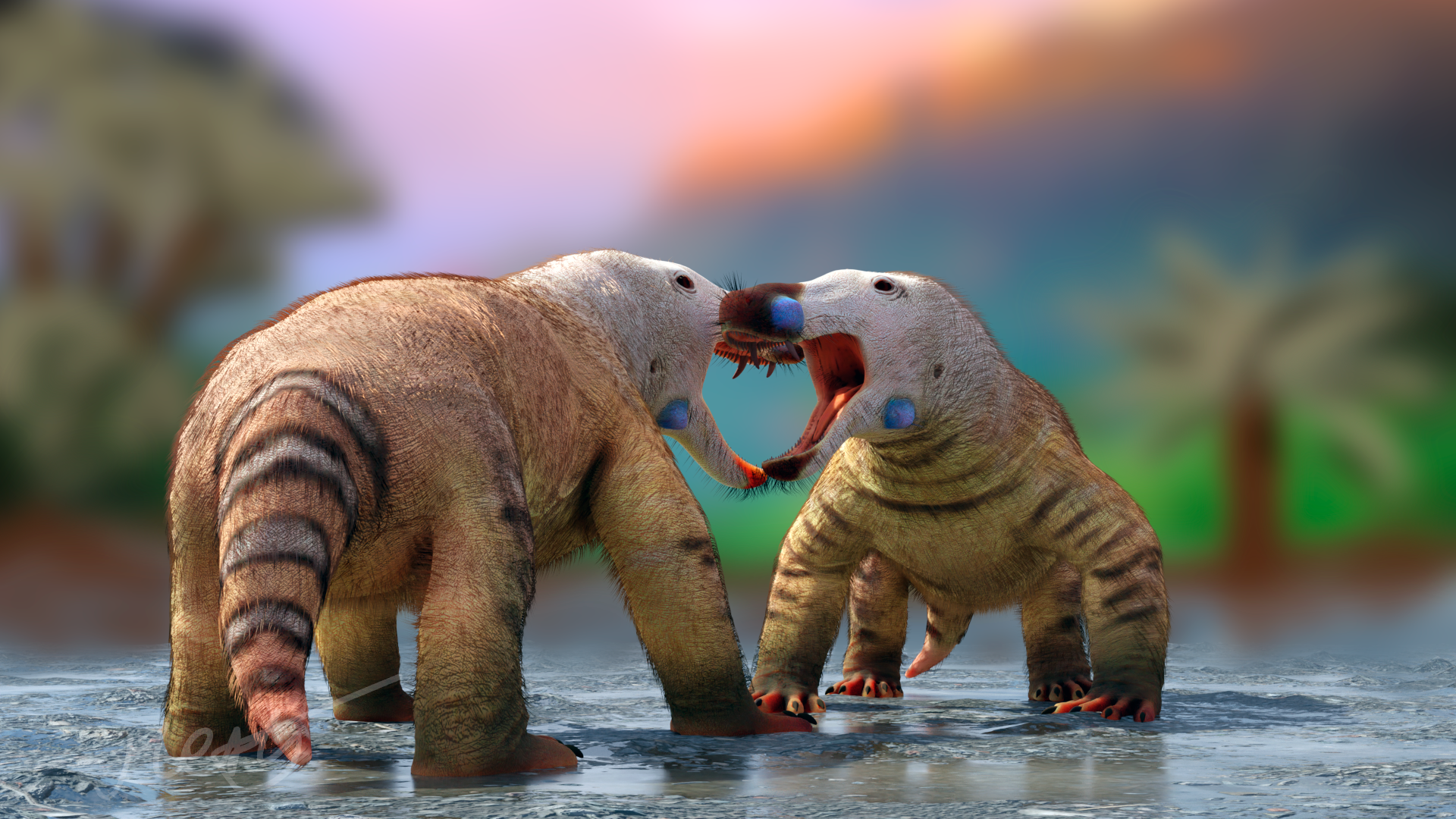
Life restoration

Choerosaurus is similar in appearance to Scaloposaurus. In both Choerosaurus and Scaloposaurus, the back of the skull (called the occiput) is high and the canine teeth are thick and shortened. Choerosaurus also has teeth that are ankylothecodont, meaning that they are fused to the bone of the jaw and would not have been replaced when it was alive.

== Taxonomy ==
Choerosaurus was traditionally classified in the Scalopodontia, a group of small therocephalians. Scalopodontians are now thought to be a polyphyletic grouping of mostly juvenile therocephalians, and most taxa are now classified as basal members of Baurioidea. The position of Choerosaurus within Baurioidea is uncertain, as it has never been incorporated in a phylogenetic analysis.
