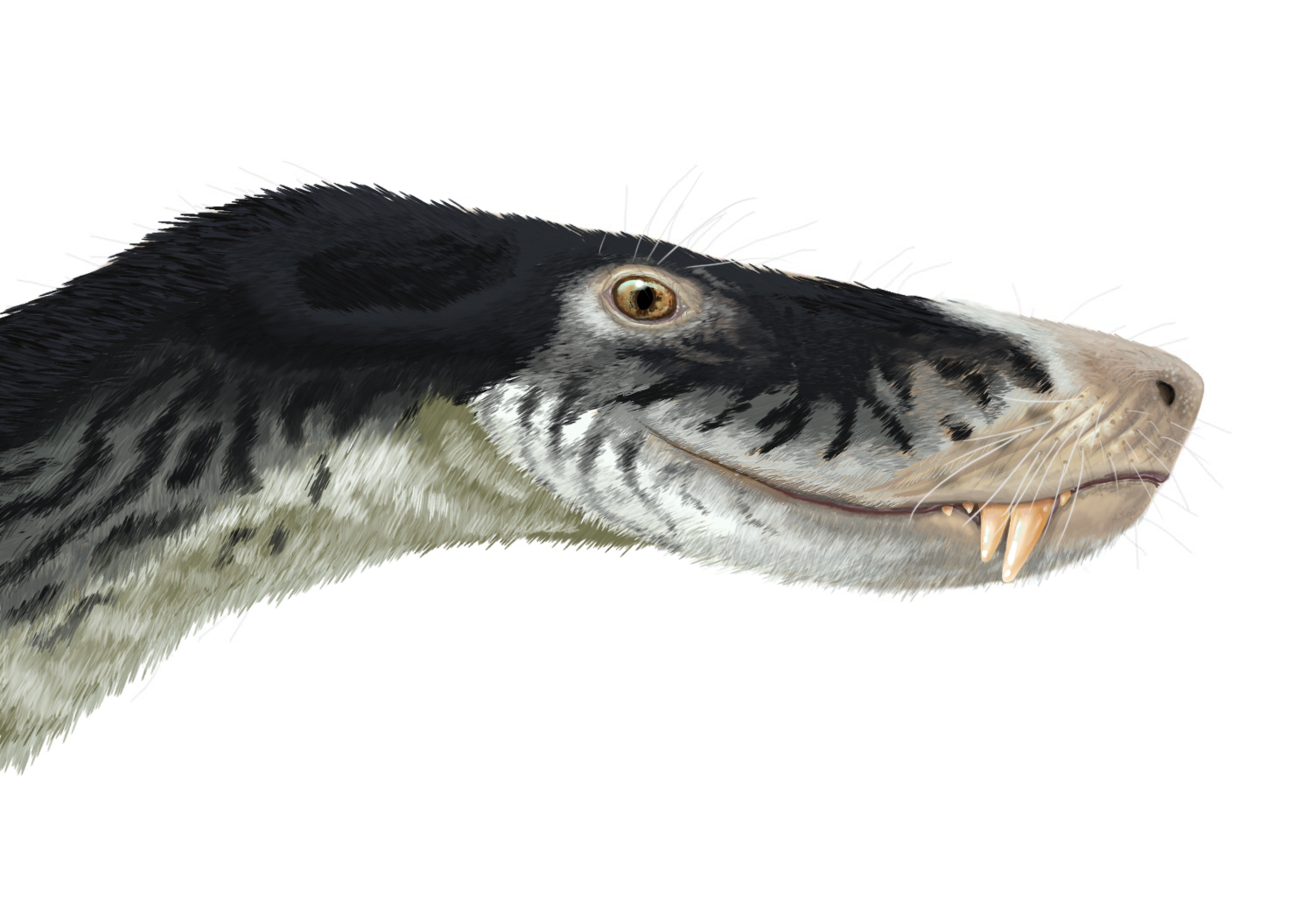
- Life restoration of Ictidosuchoides sp.

Scientific classification
- Kingdom: Animalia
- Phylum: Chordata
- Clade: Synapsida
- Clade: Therapsida
- Clade: †Therocephalia
- Family: †Ictidosuchidae
- Genus: †Ictidosuchoides; Broom 1931

Species
- †I. longiceps; †I. rubidgei

= Ictidosuchoides =

Ictidosuchoides Temporal range: Late Permian ~259–252 Ma

Extinct genus of therapsids from the late Permian and early Triassic of South Africa

Ictidosuchoides is an extinct genus of ictidosuchid therocephalians. Fossils have been found from the Karoo Basin in South Africa. The genus was previously thought to have been one of the few therocephalians to have survived the Permian-Triassic extinction event in this area, but the putative early Triassic specimens have since been attributed to Promoschorhynchus.

== See also ==
- List of therapsids
- Ictidosuchops
