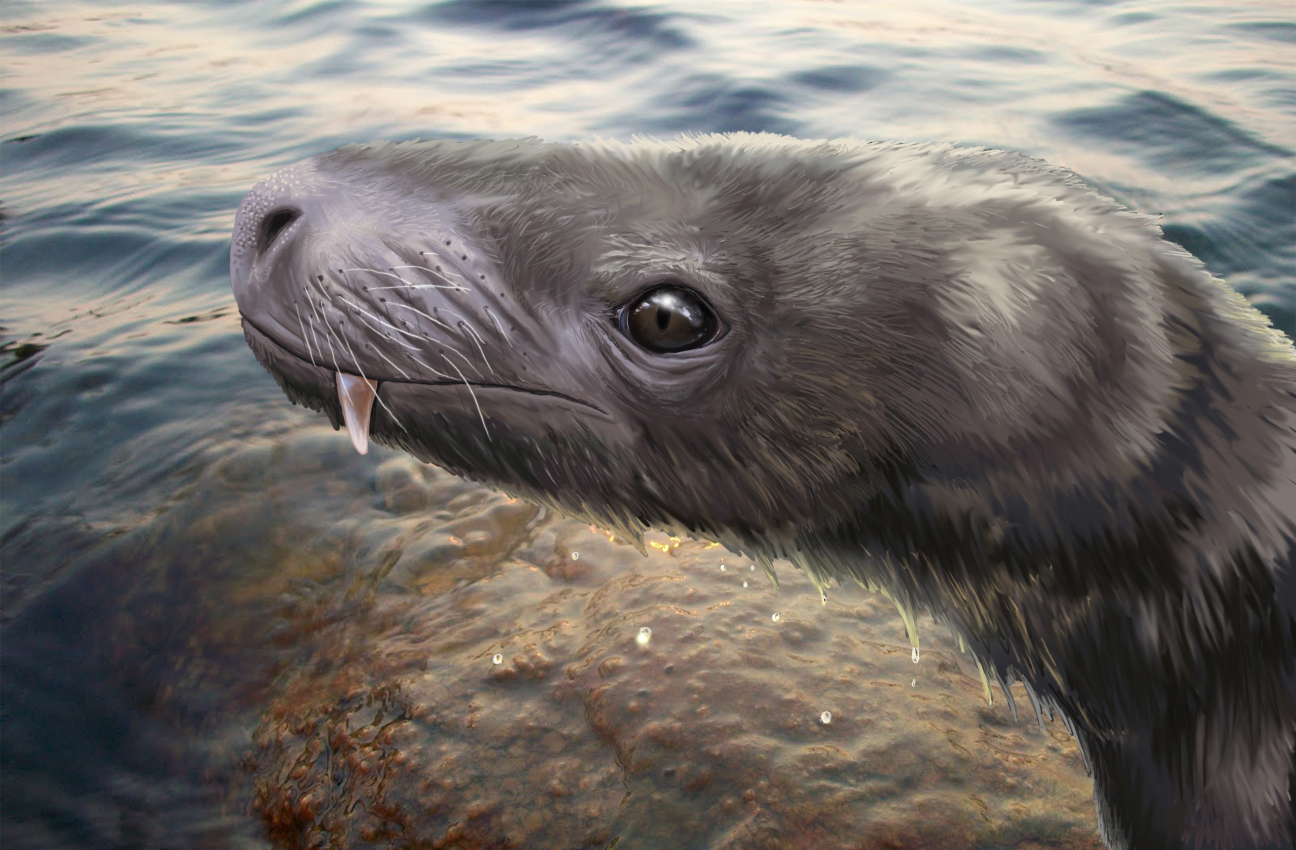
- Life restoration of Perplexisaurus foveatus

Scientific classification
- Domain: Eukaryota
- Kingdom: Animalia
- Phylum: Chordata
- Clade: Synapsida
- Clade: Therapsida
- Clade: †Therocephalia
- Clade: †Eutherocephalia
- Genus: †Perplexisaurus; Tatarinov 1997

Species
- †P. foveatus Tatarinov 1997 (type); †P. lepusculus Ivachnenko 2011

= Perplexisaurus =

Perplexisaurus Temporal range: Middle-Late Permian ~260–252.3 Ma

Genus of therapsid from the Middle to Late Permian of Russia

Perplexisaurus is a genus of therocephalian therapsid from the Middle to Late Permian Deltavjatia vjatkensis Assemblage Zone, Vanyushonki Member of the Urpalov Formation of Russia. It was described by L. P. Tatarinov in 1997, and the type species is P. foveatus. A new species, P. lepusculus, was described by M.F. Ivachnenko in 2011, from Russia.
