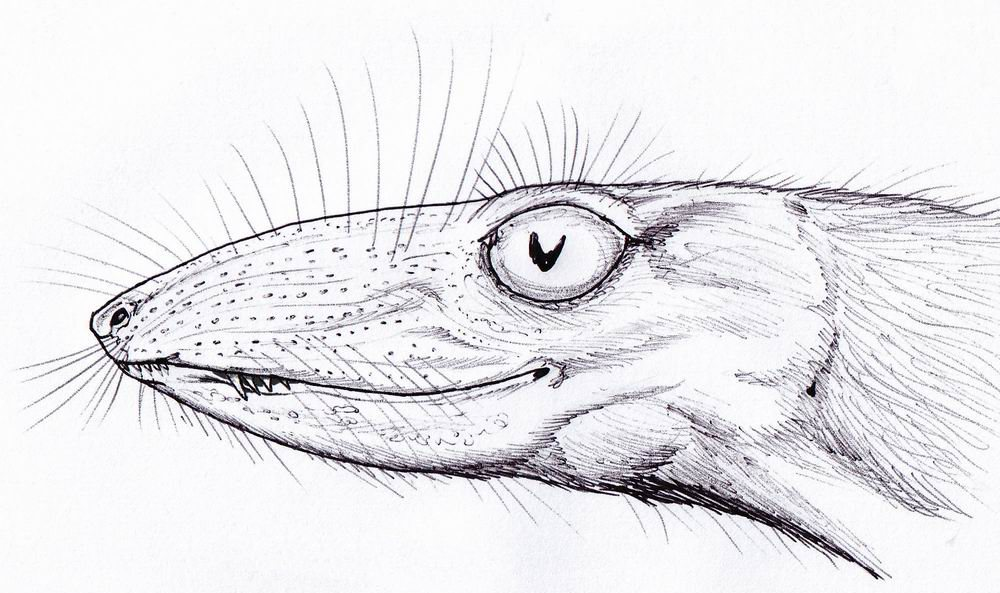

Scientific classification
- Domain: Eukaryota
- Kingdom: Animalia
- Phylum: Chordata
- Clade: Synapsida
- Clade: Therapsida
- Clade: †Therocephalia
- Family: †Scaloposauridae
- Genus: †Scaloposaurus; Owen, 1876

Type species
- Scaloposaurus constrictus Owen, 1876

= Scaloposaurus =

Scaloposaurus Temporal range: Late Permian

Extinct genus of therapsids from Permian South Africa

Scaloposaurus is an extinct genus of carnivorous therocephalians living during the Permian 259.0—254.0 Ma existing for approximately 5 million years.

== Taxonomy ==
Scaloposaurus was named by Owen (1876). It was assigned to Therocephalia by Broom (1913); and to Scaloposauridae by Carroll (1988).

== See also ==
- List of therapsids
