= Ictidosuchus =

Scientific classification
- Domain: Eukaryota
- Kingdom: Animalia
- Phylum: Chordata
- Clade: Synapsida
- Genus: †Ictidosuchus; Broom, 1900

Extinct genus of therapsid

Ictidosuchus is an extinct genus of therocephalian therapsids.
