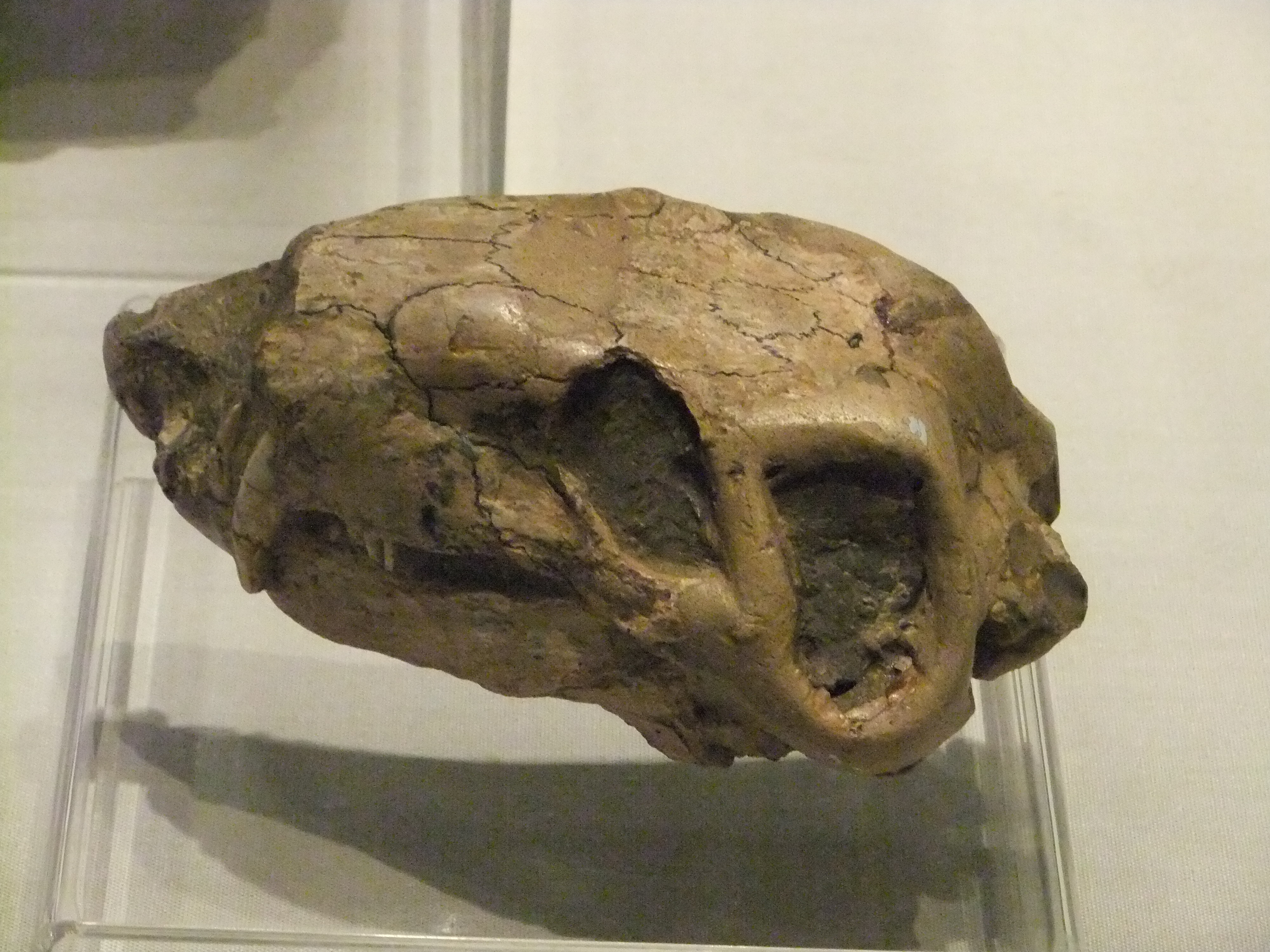

Scientific classification
- Kingdom: Animalia
- Phylum: Chordata
- Clade: Synapsida
- Genus: †Ictidosuchops; Broom, 1938

= Ictidosuchops =

Ictidosuchops Temporal range: 260–252 Ma

Genus of therapsids

Ictidosuchops is a genus of therocephalian therapsids. There are currently two named species: Ictidosuchops intermedius and Ictidosuchops baurioides.
