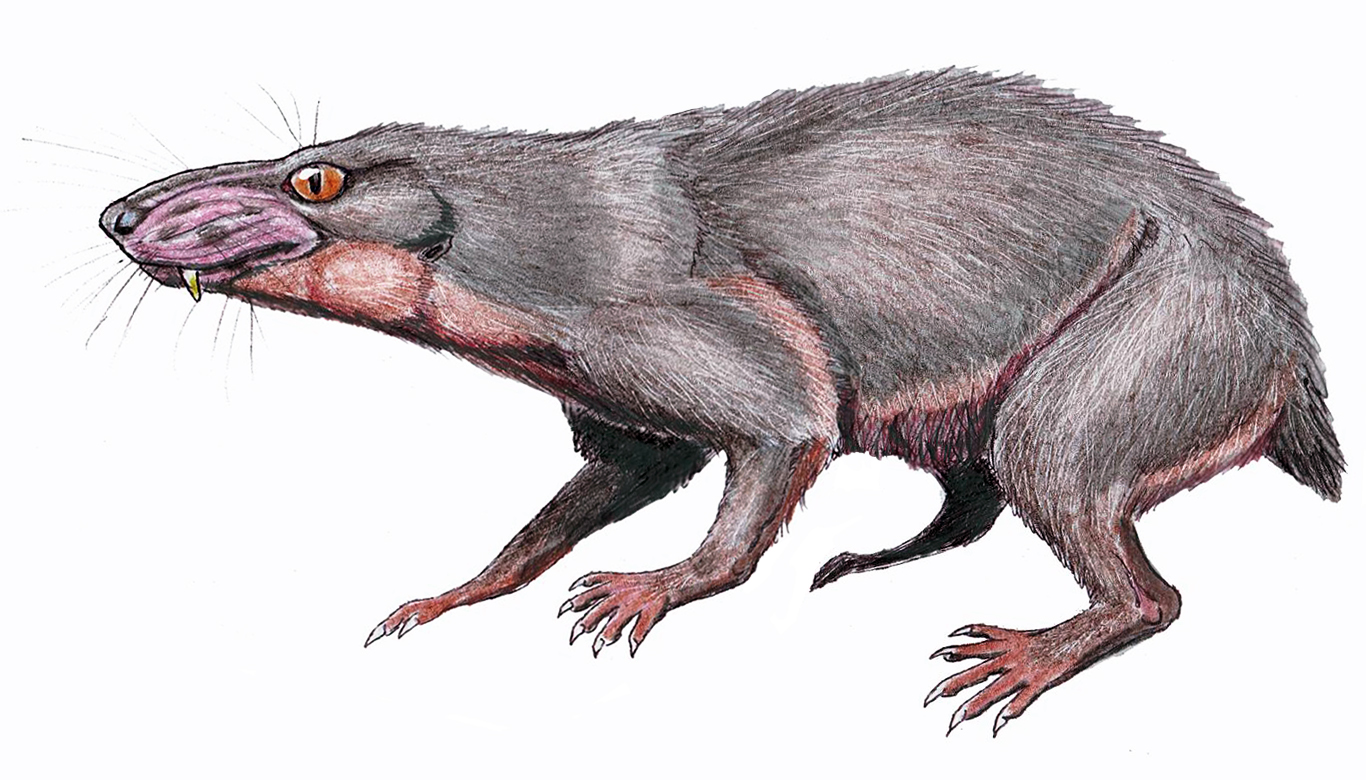
- Restoration of Regisaurus

Scientific classification
- Kingdom: Animalia
- Phylum: Chordata
- Clade: Synapsida
- Clade: Therapsida
- Clade: †Therocephalia
- Superfamily: †Baurioidea
- Family: †Regisauridae; Hopson & Barghausen, 1986

Genera
- Regisaurus; Urumchia

= Regisauridae =

Regisauridae Temporal range: Late Permian–Early Triassic

Extinct family of therapsids

Regisauridae is an extinct family of small carnivorous theriodonts from the Late Permian and Early Triassic of South Africa and China.

== Classification ==
Below is a cladogram modified from analysis published by Adam K. Huttenlocker in 2014.

- Baurioidea
  - Ictidosuchops rubidgei
  - Ictidosuchidae
    - Ictidosuchus primaevus
    - Ictidosuchoides longiceps
  - - Regisauridae
      - Regisaurus jacobi
      - Urumchia lii
    - - - Karenitidae
          - NHCC LB44 (Unnamed Zambian karenitid)
          - Karenites ornamentatus
        - Lycideopidae
          - Lycideops longiceps
          - - Choerosaurus dejageri
            - - Tetracynodon tenuis
              - Tetracynodon darti
      - - Scaloposaurus constrictus
        - - Ericiolacertidae
            - Ericiolacerta parva
            - Silphedosuchus orenburgensis
          - - Nothogomphodon danilovi
            - "Ordosiidae"
              - Hazhenia concava
              - Ordosiodon youngi
            - Bauriidae
              - Bauria cynops
              - - Antecosuchus ochevi
                - Microgomphodon oligocynus
                - Traversodontoides wangwuensis
