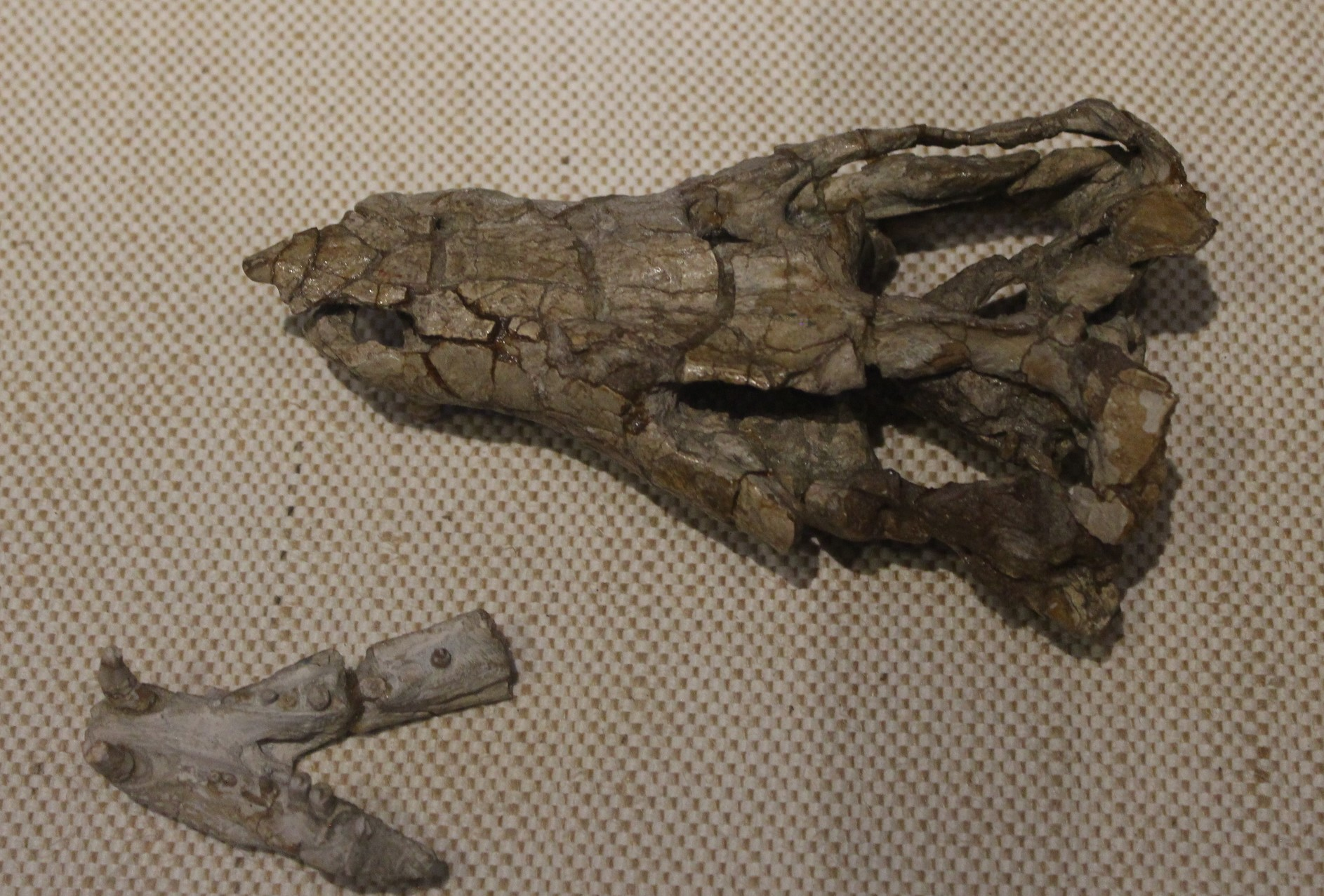
- Holotype, Paleozoological Museum of China

Scientific classification
- Kingdom: Animalia
- Phylum: Chordata
- Clade: Synapsida
- Clade: Therapsida
- Clade: †Therocephalia
- Superfamily: †Baurioidea
- Genus: †Hazhenia; Sun and Hou, 1981

Type species
- †Hazhenia concava Sun and Hou, 1981

= Hazhenia =

Hazhenia Temporal range: Early Triassic, Olenekian

Genus of from the Early Triassic of China

Hazhenia is an extinct genus of therocephalian therapsids from the Early Triassic of China, of which Hazhenia concava is the only species. Hazhenia was named in 1981 from the Heshanggou Formation in the Ordos Desert of Inner Mongolia. It lived during the Olenekian Age of the Early Triassic, about 247 million years ago. Hazhenia belongs to a group of therocephalians called Baurioidea and possesses many mammal-like features such as cusped teeth and a secondary palate, both of which evolved independently in baurioids. Within Baurioidea it is most closely related to the genus Ordosiodon, which is also known from Inner Mongolia but comes from the slightly younger Ermaying Formation. Both genera were once placed in the family Ordosiidae, but as the name is preoccupied by a family of Cambrian trilobites, it is no longer valid.

Hazhenia is known from a single skull that was discovered by a group from the Institute of Vertebrate Paleontology and Paleoanthropology in 1977, a year after the discovery of the first Ordosiodon remains. Both were initially classified as members of Scaloposauria, a group of small-sized therocephalians now regarded as a paraphyletic assemblage of basal baurioids. A phylogenetic analysis of therocephalians published in 2014 found Hazhenia and Ordosiodon to be each other's closest relatives, and placed both in a derived position within Baurioidea, close to the family Bauriidae. Below is a cladogram from that analysis:

- Therocephalia
  - Lycosuchus vanderrieti
  - Scylacosauria
    - Scylacosauridae
    - Eutherocephalia
      - Scylacosuchus orenburgensis
      - - Perplexisaurus foveatus
        - Chthonosauridae
        - Akidnognathidae
        - - - Hofmeyriidae
            - Whaitsiidae
          - Baurioidea
            - Ictidosuchops rubidgei
            - Ictidosuchidae
            - - Regisauridae
              - - - Karenitidae
                  - Lycideopidae
                - - Scaloposaurus constrictus
                  - - Ericiolacertidae
                    - - Nothogomphodon danilovi
                      - "Ordosiidae"
                        - Hazhenia concava
                        - Ordosiodon youngi
                      - Bauriidae
                        - Bauria cynops
                        - - Antecosuchus ochevi
                          - Microgomphodon oligocynus
                          - Traversodontoides wangwuensis
