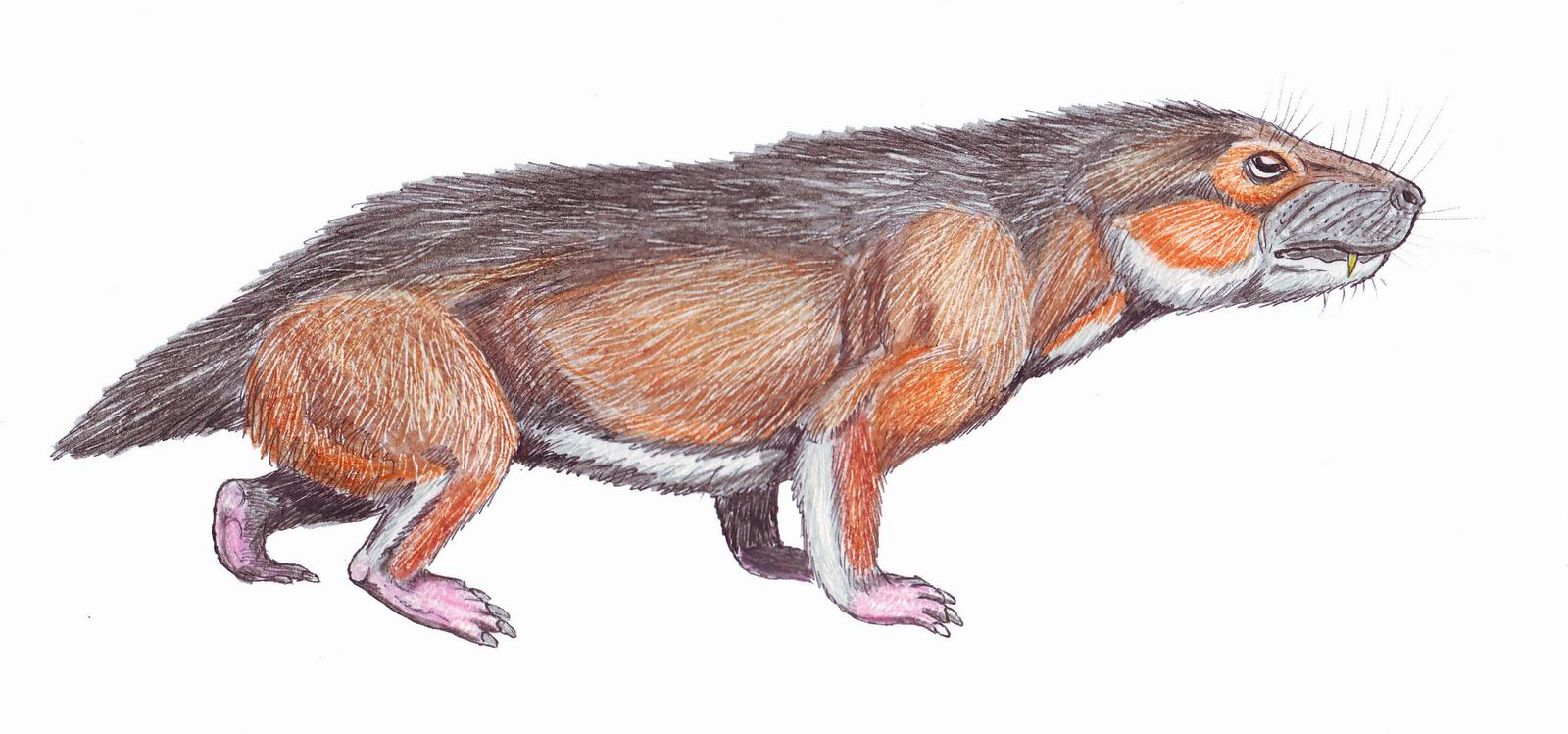
- Life restoration of Microgomphodon

Scientific classification
- Kingdom: Animalia
- Phylum: Chordata
- Clade: Synapsida
- Clade: Therapsida
- Clade: †Therocephalia
- Superfamily: †Baurioidea
- Family: †Bauriidae; Broom, 1911

Genera
- †Antecosuchus †Bauria ?†Hazhenia †Microgomphodon ?†Nothogomphodon ?†Ordosiodon †Scalopognathus †Traversodontoides

= Bauriidae =

Extinct family of therapsids

Bauriidae is an extinct family of therocephalian therapsids. Bauriids were the latest-surviving group of therocephalians after the Permian–Triassic extinction event, going extinct in the Middle Triassic. They are among the most advanced eutherocephalians and possess several mammal-like features such as a secondary palate and wide postcanine teeth at the back of the jaws (analogous to mammalian molars). Unlike other therocephalians, bauriids were herbivorous. They were also smaller than earlier members of the group. Two subfamilies are classified within Bauriidae: Nothogomphodontinae and Bauriinae.

== Description ==
Bauriids have a dentition characteristic of herbivores with the exception of Nothogomphodon. There are four incisors on either side of the upper jaw. Like other therocephalians, bauriids have moderately enlarged canines. The postcanine teeth behind the canines are broad. The postcanines of the upper and lower jaw fit tightly together as an adaptation to processing plant material.

An autapomorphy or unique feature of Bauriidae is the expansion of the dentary bone of the lower jaw inward toward the jaw midline, forming a wide shelf of bone to either side of the tooth row. A similar expansion of the maxilla in the upper jaw is also seen in bauriids, although it is not unique to the group as the feature has also evolved in a group of cynodont therapsids called gomphodonts (which, like bauriids, were herbivorous).

== Phylogeny ==
Bauriids belong to a large clade or evolutionary grouping of therapsids called Therocephalia that is closely related to mammals (mammals are part of Cynodontia, the sister taxon of Therocephalia in most studies). Within Therocephalia, bauriids are part of a subgroup called Eutherocephalia, which includes all but the most basal therocephalians. Nested within Eutherocephalia is a clade called Baurioidea, of which bauriids are the most derived members (baurioids that fell outside Bauriidae were traditionally all placed within a group called Scaloposauria, but the group is now thought to be a paraphyletic assemblage of basal baurioids). The inter-group relationships of Bauriidae are uncertain. Battail and Surkov (2003) split it into two subfamilies: Nothogomphodontinae, which included the genus Nothogomphodon; and Bauriinae, which included all other bauriids. In his phylogenetic analysis of therocephalians, Huttenlocker (2014) found support for Nothogomphodon being more basal than other bauriids, but also found a clade containing Ordosiodon and Hazhenia (Chinese therocephalians that had previously been grouped together under the family Ordosiidae) to be the sister group of these other bauriids, with Nothogomphodon occupying a more basal position. Huttenlocker therefore restricted the name Bauriidae to the sister group of Ordosiidae. The cladogram below is modified from Huttenlocker (2014), showing the position of Bauriidae within Therocephalia and the interrelationships of bauriids supported by his analysis:

- Therocephalia
  - Lycosuchus vanderrieti
  - Scylacosauria
    - Scylacosauridae
    - Eutherocephalia
      - Scylacosuchus orenburgensis
      - - Perplexisaurus foveatus
        - Chthonosauridae
        - Akidnognathidae
        - - - Hofmeyriidae
            - Whaitsiidae
          - Baurioidea
            - Ictidosuchops rubidgei
            - Ictidosuchidae
            - - Regisauridae
              - - - Karenitidae
                  - Lycideopidae
                - - Scaloposaurus constrictus
                  - - Ericiolacertidae
                    - - Nothogomphodon danilovi
                      - "Ordosiidae"
                        - Hazhenia concava
                        - Ordosiodon youngi
                      - Bauriidae
                        - Bauria cynops
                        - - Antecosuchus ochevi
                          - Microgomphodon oligocynus
                          - Traversodontoides wangwuensis
