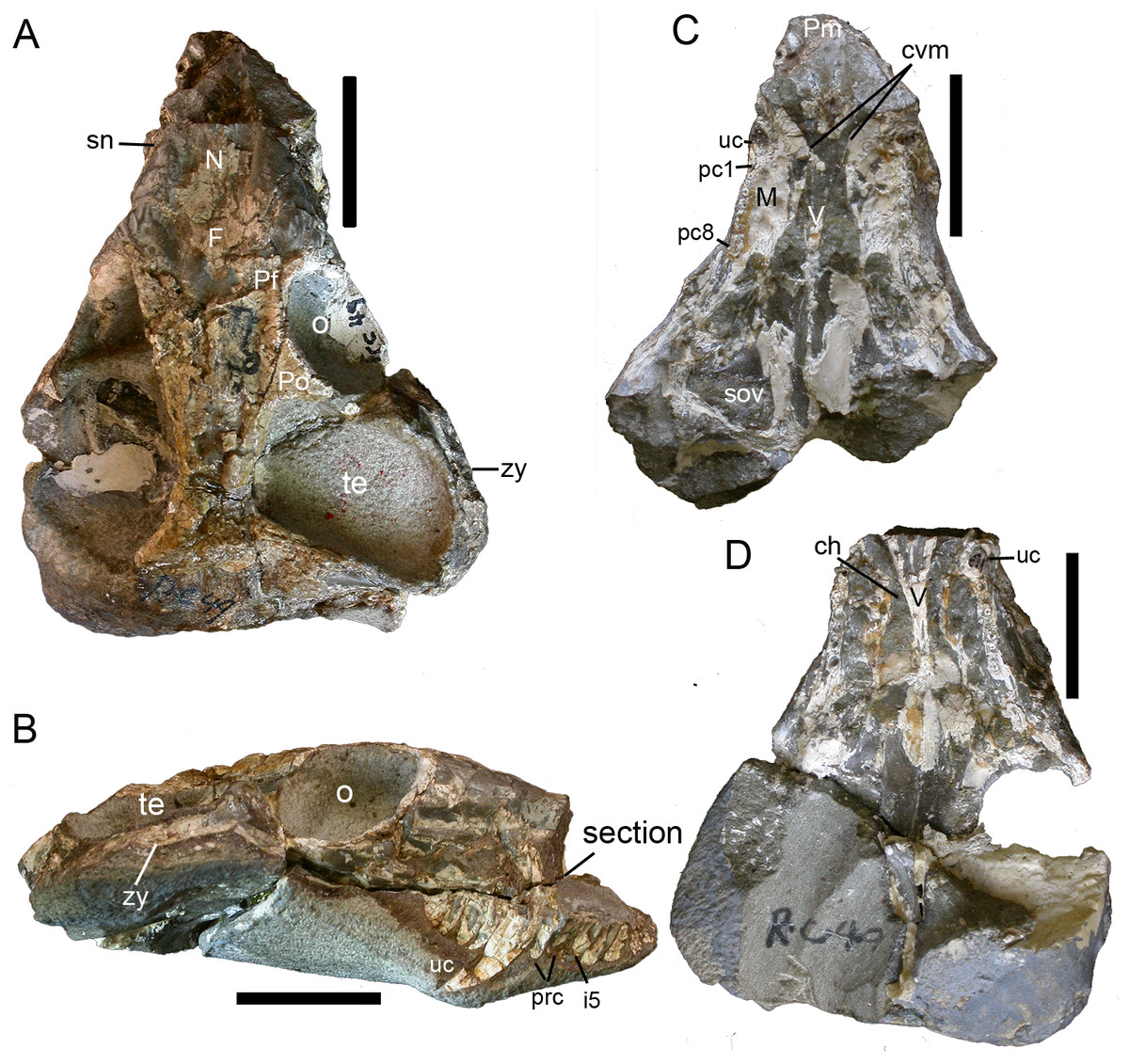
- Holotype skull in (A) dorsal and (B) right lateral views; section of skull (indicated in B) in (C) dorsal and (D) ventral views. Scale bar = 2 cm

Scientific classification
- Kingdom: Animalia
- Phylum: Chordata
- Clade: Synapsida
- Clade: Therapsida
- Clade: †Therocephalia
- Clade: †Eutherocephalia
- Family: †Nanictidopidae
- Genus: †Nanictidops; Broom, 1940

Type species
- Nanictidops kitchingi Broom, 1940

= Nanictidops =

Nanictidops Temporal range: Late Permian

Extinct genus of therapsids

Nanictidops is an extinct genus of therocephalian therapsids from the Late Permian of South Africa's Karoo Supergroup, containing the single species Nanictidops kitchingi. Together with the closely related Russian genus Purlovia, it is a member of the family Nanictidopidae, although this is contended.

The holotype and only specimen, RC 49, is part of the Rubidge collection in Graaf-Reinet, where it was originally found.

== Description ==
The skull is short and wide with enormous canines and post-canines. Of teeth, it had 3 canines, 5 incisors and 8 molars. Broom 1947 notes that it resembles the skull of Ictidochampsa.

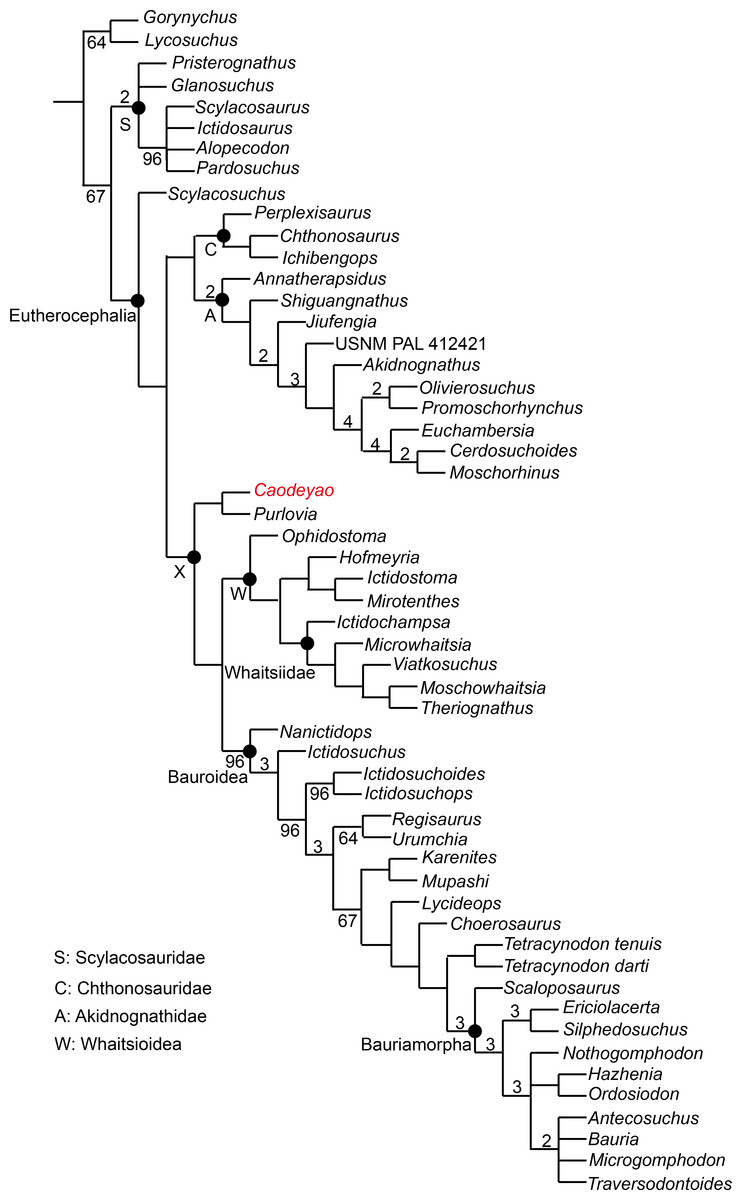
Therocephalia major consensus tree (Liu and Abdala, 2020)

== Taxonomy ==
Although it and Purlovia were considered related and classified as the only two members of Nanictidopidae by Ivakhnenko 2011 because they shared a wide temporal region, Liu and Abdala 2020 found little relation between the two genera and instead classifies Nanictidops as the basalmost member of Baurioidea, while Purlovia forms an exclusively Laurasian clade with the Chinese genus Caodeyao instead.
