= Pedaeosaurus =

Pedaeosaurus Temporal range: Early Triassic

Scientific classification
- Domain: Eukaryota
- Kingdom: Animalia
- Phylum: Chordata
- Clade: Synapsida
- Clade: Therapsida
- Clade: †Therocephalia
- Family: †Ericiolacertidae
- Genus: †Pedaeosaurus; Colbert and Kitching, 1981

Type species
- †P. parvus Colbert & Kitching, 1981

Extinct genus of therapsids from the early Triassic of Antarctica

Pedaeosaurus is an extinct genus of therocephalian therapsids. Fossils have been found from the Fremouw Formation in the southern Transantarctic Mountains of Antarctica. Pedaeosaurus has traditionally been classified as a scaloposaurid and more recently as an ericiolacertid closely related to Ericiolacerta (also from the Fremouw Formation).
