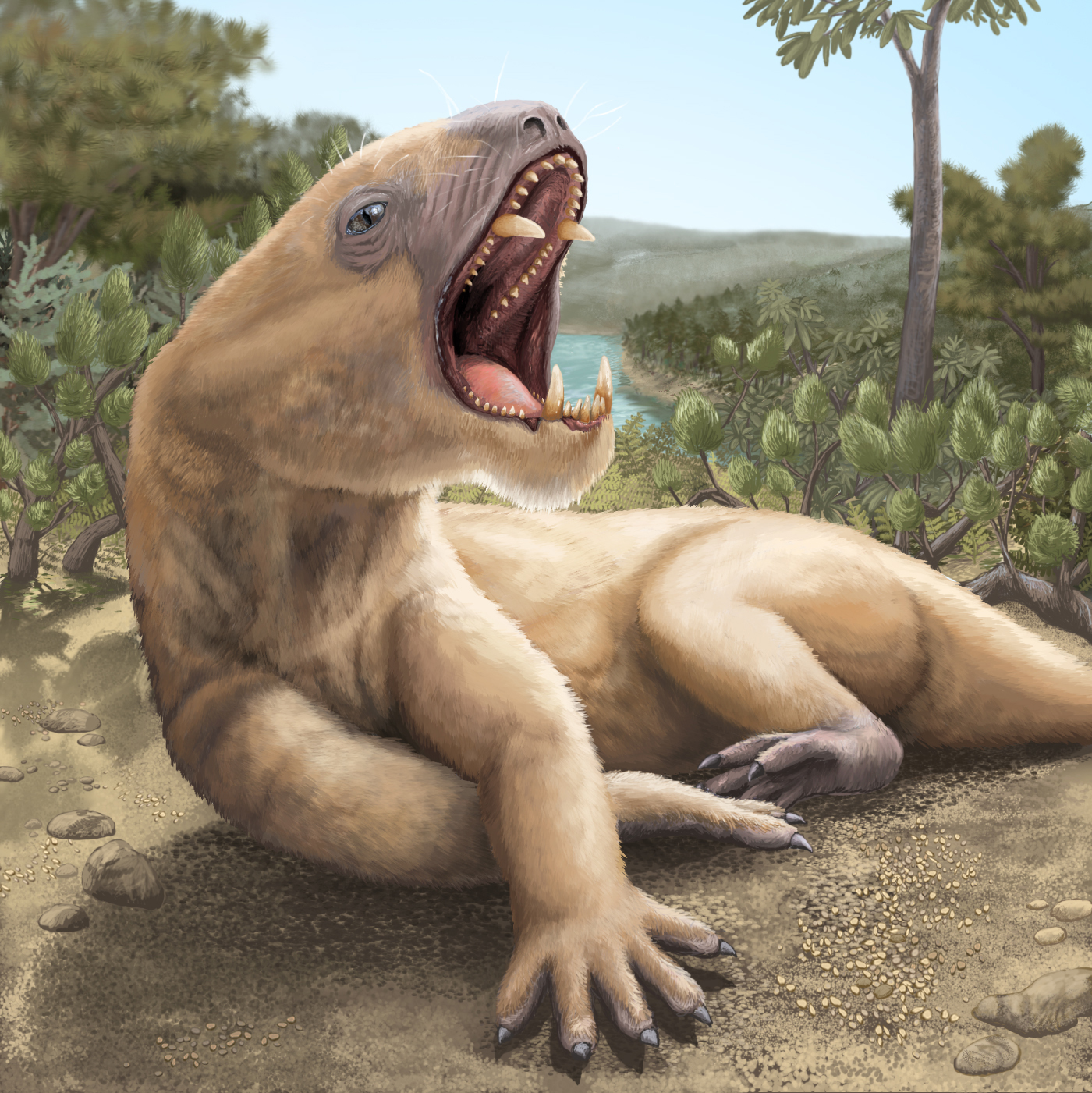
- Restoration of the nanictidopid Purlovia maxima

Scientific classification
- Kingdom: Animalia
- Phylum: Chordata
- Clade: Synapsida
- Clade: Therapsida
- Clade: †Therocephalia
- Clade: †Eutherocephalia
- Family: †Nanictidopidae; Watson and Romer, 1956

Genera
- Nanictidops; Purlovia

= Nanictidopidae =

Nanictidopidae Temporal range: Late Permian

Extinct family of therapsids

Nanictidopidae is an extinct family of therocephalian therapsids from the Late Permian. Two genera are currently included in the family, Nanictidops from South Africa and Purlovia from Russia. Nanictidopids have short skulls and were probably herbivorous.

Although Ivakhnenko 2011 considered Nanictidops and Purlovia closely related and classified them as the only two members of Nanictidopidae as they shared a wide temporal region, Liu and Abdala 2020 found little relation between the two genera and instead classifies Nanictidops as the basalmost member of Baurioidea, while Purlovia forms an exclusively Laurasian clade with the Chinese Caodeyao instead.

== Description ==
In comparison to other therocephalians, nanictidopids are relatively large, with skulls ranging from 7 to 20 centimetres (3 to 8 in) in length. Nanictidopids are characterized by their shortened skulls that appear triangular when viewed from above. The temporal region of the skull is very wide. Their skulls are similar to those of hofmeyriids, and the superfamily Nanictidopoidea has been established to unite these two groups. Nanictidopids have enlarged canine teeth in their upper and lower jaws, while the teeth behind them are very small. Small bumps and ridges cover parts of the upper and lower jaws. The parietal region at the back of the skull forms a sagittal crest. The postorbital bones that make up the back of the eye sockets are very thin, and sometimes do not enclose the entire socket. Unlike more advanced therocephalians, nanictidopids lack a secondary palate.

== History ==
Nanictidopidae was named in 1956 by paleontologists D. M. S. Watson and Alfred Romer. Watson and Romer included many therocephalians in the family, including Blattoidealestes, Choerosaurus, Hofmeyria, and Promoschorhynchus. These therocephalians have since been split up among other families like Hofmeyriidae and Akidnognathidae.

== Paleobiology ==
Except for the canines, nanictidopids lack the large pointed teeth of carnivorous therocephalians. Nanictidopids are thought to have been herbivorous, but they lack the enlarged buccal or cheek teeth of most herbivores. Although wear facets indicate use, most teeth are small and would have served little function in processing plant material. Another adaptation toward herbivory is the development of horny plates on the palate, but nanictidopids show no evidence of this adaptation either. One of the few indications of diet comes from a broken and polished canine in a specimen of Purlovia. In life, this tooth may have been broken and worn smooth as it was digging for food. Nanictidopids were most likely primitive herbivores, possibly fruit-eating.
