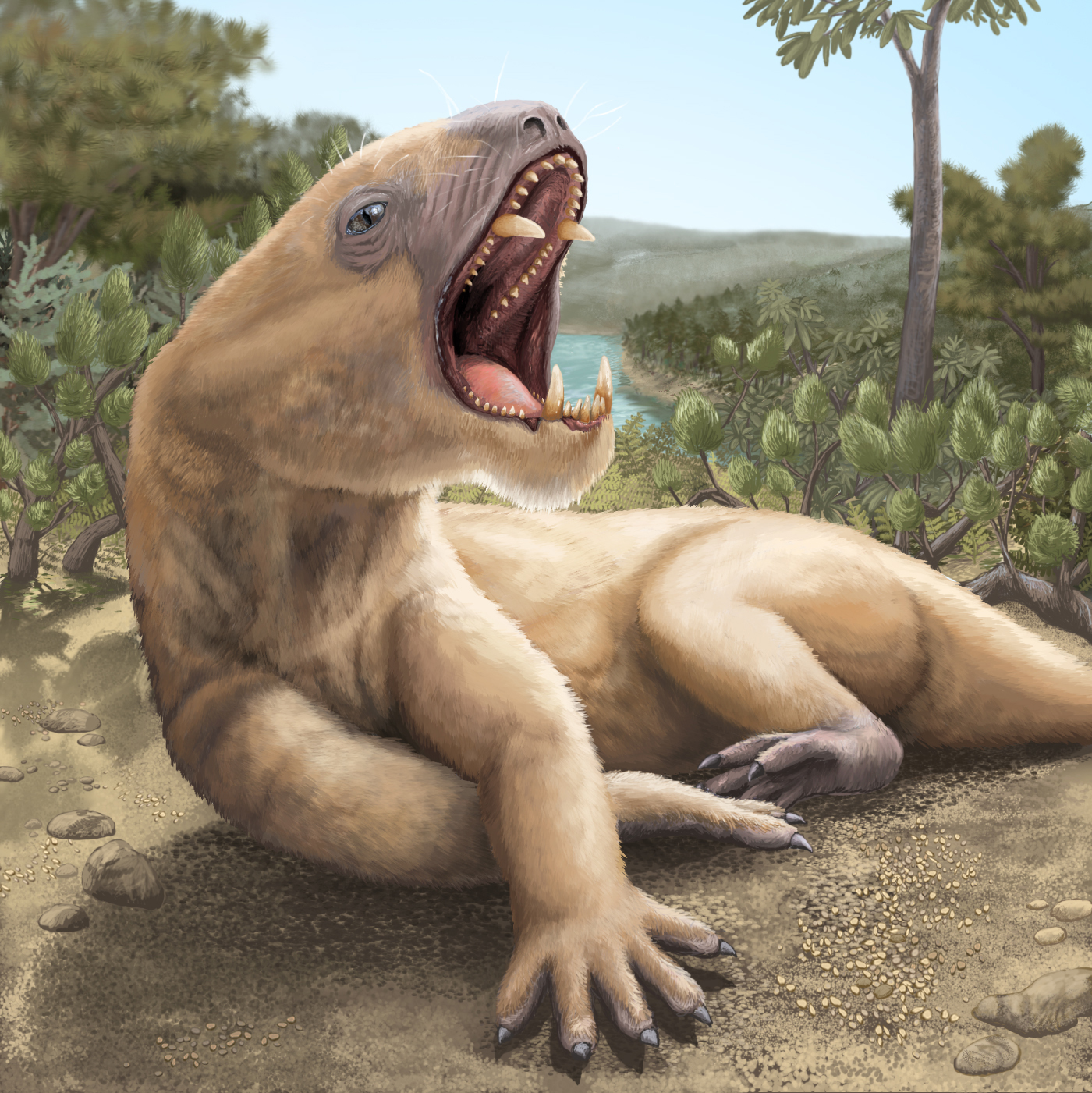
- Restoration of Purlovia maxima

Scientific classification
- Kingdom: Animalia
- Phylum: Chordata
- Clade: Synapsida
- Clade: Therapsida
- Clade: †Therocephalia
- Family: †Nanictidopidae
- Genus: †Purlovia; Ivakhnenko, 2011

Type species
- †P. maxima Ivakhnenko, 2011

= Purlovia =

Purlovia Temporal range: Late Permian

Extinct genus of therapsids from the Late Permian of Russia

Purlovia is an extinct genus of herbivorous therocephalian therapsids from the Late Permian of Russia. Fossils have been found from the Tonshayevsky District of Nizhny Novgorod Oblast. The type species of Purlovia, P. maxima, was named in 2011.

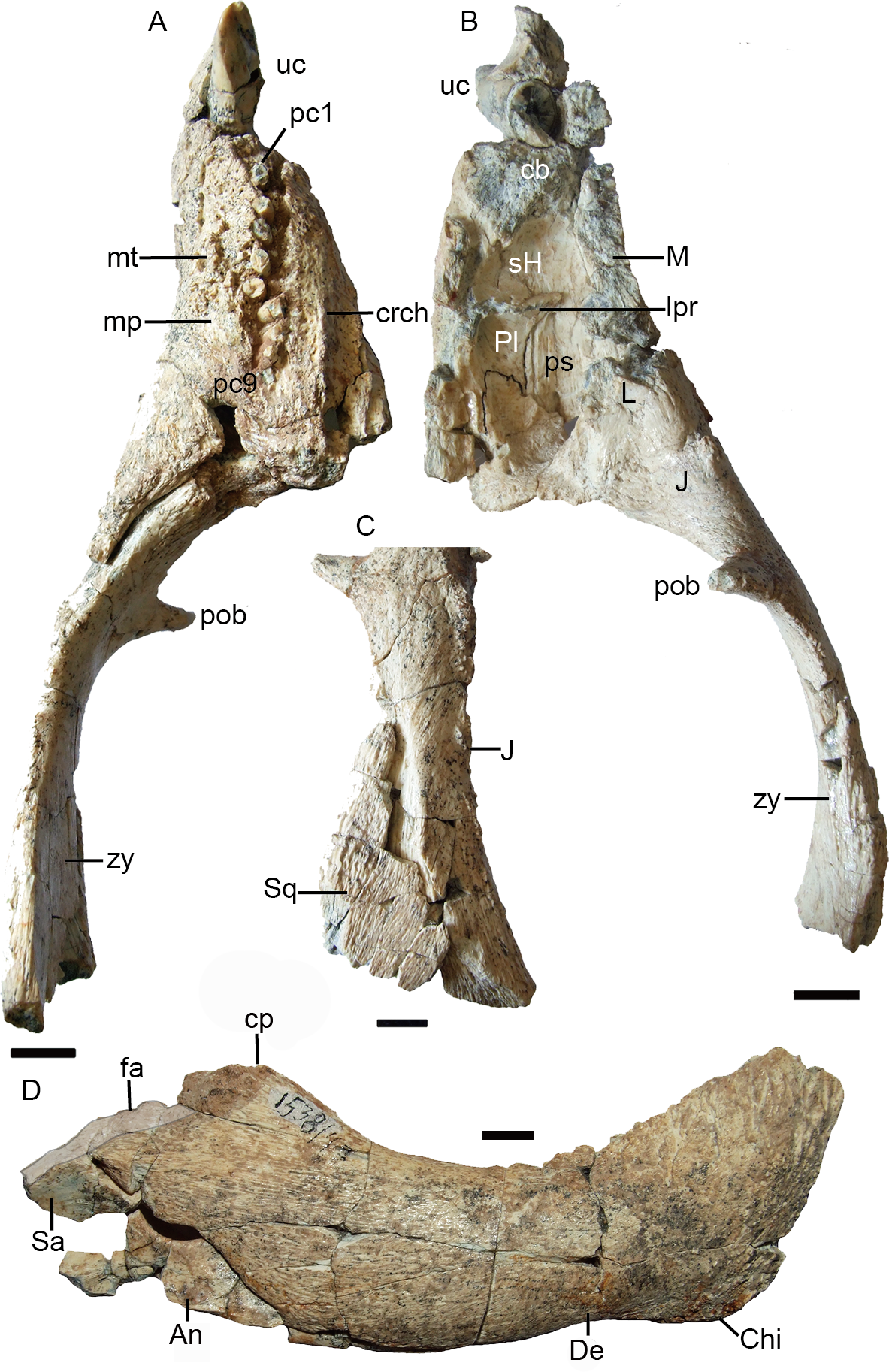
Holotype skull

In comparison to other therocephalians, Purlovia had a very wide skull due to a widened temporal region. Viewed from above, it looks roughly triangular. The skull is about 20 centimetres (7.9 in) long, with nearly half its length in the postorbital region behind the eye sockets. It has large canine teeth, and smaller buccal (cheek) teeth along the thick upper and lower jaws. The lower jaw is robust and curved upward, with a well-developed symphyseal region where the two halves of the jaw meet.

== Classification ==
Although it and the South African Nanictidops were considered closely related and classified as the only two members of Nanictidopidae by Ivakhnenko 2011 as they shared a wide temporal region, Liu and Abdala 2020 found little relation between the two genera and instead classifies Nanictidops as the basalmost member of Baurioidea, while Purlovia forms an exclusively Laurasian clade with Caodeyao from China instead.

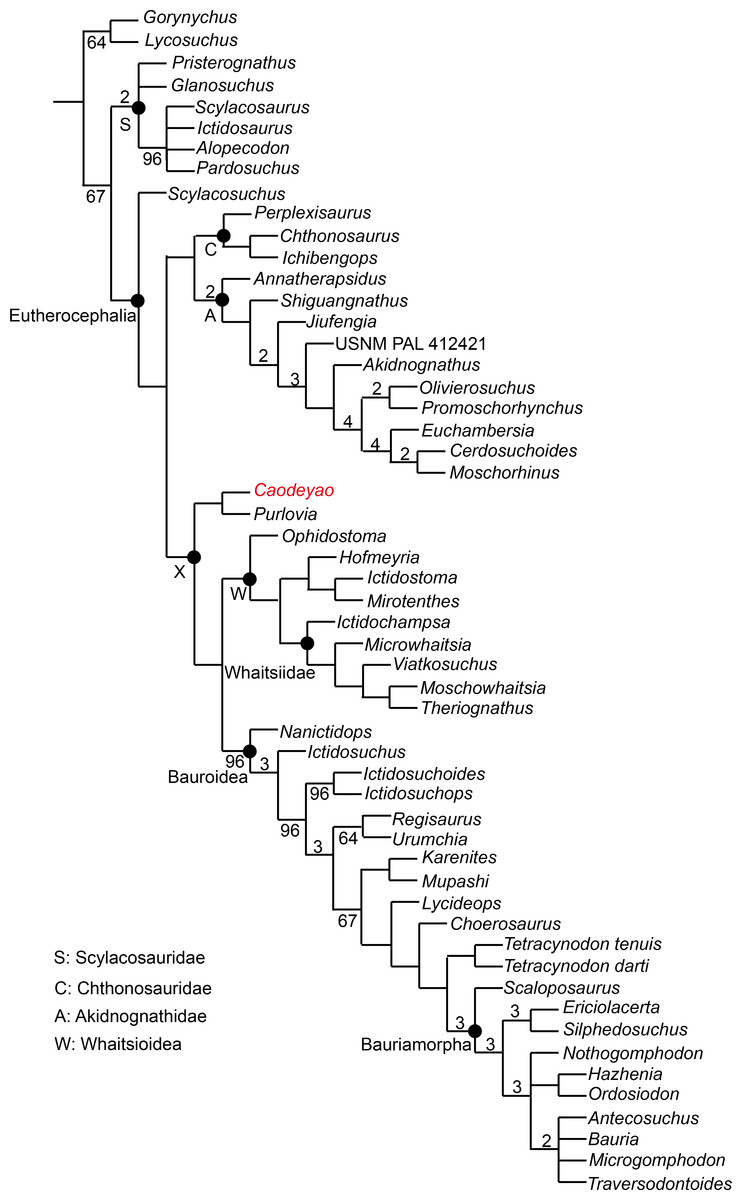
Therocephalia major consensus tree (Liu and Abdala, 2020)
