= Scalopognathus =

Scalopognathus Temporal range: 252.3–251.3 Ma

Scientific classification
- Domain: Eukaryota
- Kingdom: Animalia
- Phylum: Chordata
- Clade: Synapsida
- Clade: Therapsida
- Clade: †Therocephalia
- Family: †Scalopognathidae
- Genus: †Scalopognathus
- Species: †S. multituberculatus

Binomial name
- †Scalopognathus multituberculatus Tatarinov, 1974

Extinct genus of therapsids

Scalopognathus multituberculatus is a therocephalian from the Early Triassic of the Komi Republic of Russia. It was first named and described in 1974 by Leonid Tatarinov from a singular lower jaw. He later found more material, including a partial skull and a few vertebrae, belonging to this species. It is currently the only species in the genus Scalopognathus.
