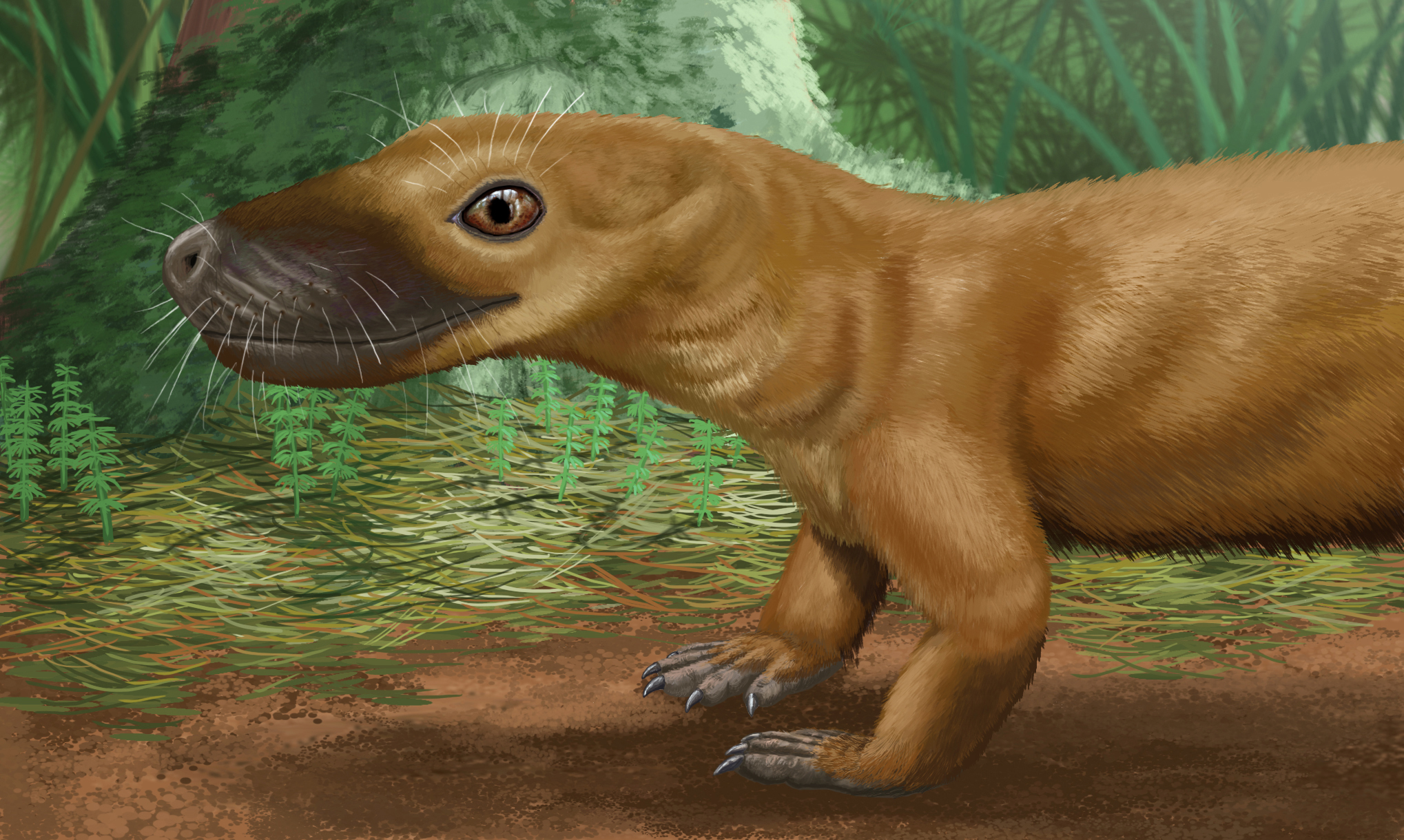
- Life restoration of Silphedosuchus orenburgensis

Scientific classification
- Domain: Eukaryota
- Kingdom: Animalia
- Phylum: Chordata
- Clade: Synapsida
- Clade: Therapsida
- Clade: †Therocephalia
- Family: †Ericiolacertidae
- Genus: †Silphedosuchus; Tatarinov, 1977

Type species
- †Silphedosuchus orenburgensis Tatarinov, 1977

= Silphedosuchus =

Silphedosuchus Temporal range: Early Triassic

Extinct genus of therapsids from the Early Triassic of Russia

Silphedosuchus is an extinct genus of therocephalian therapsids from the Early Triassic of Russia. It is a member of the family Ericiolacertidae, along with the genus Ericiolacerta from South Africa and Antarctica. The type species Silphedosuchus orenburgensis was described in 1977 on the basis of a single holotype skull from Orenburg Oblast.

Silphedosuchus was found in the Rassypnaya locality of Orenburg Oblast, dating back to the Olenekian stage of the Early Triassic. It was found in a fine-grained sandstone that contains few other vertebrates. This layer was deposited in a large floodplain that covered much of European Russia during the Early Triassic. At the Rassypnaya locality, a lens of coarser sand, presumably deposited by an ancient river, cuts through the finer-grained sandstone. This deposit contains many tetrapods such as temnospondyls and archosauromorphs, but the fossils are part of a different faunal assemblage.

The skull is about 3.5 centimetres (1.4 in) in length, with a long and pointed snout. Silphedosuchus lacks the large canine teeth present in most other therocephalians, and has rounded crushing teeth at the back of the jaws with several cusps. Silphedosuchus has large orbits or eye sockets with raised edges. The eye socket is not entirely closed because the postorbital process, which forms the posterior margin of the orbit, does not reach the jugal bone below, which forms the bottom margin of the orbit. Characters that distinguish Silphedosuchus from Ericiolacerta include a narrow contact between the palatine and vomer bones on the roof of the mouth, a contact between the vomer and the maxilla which is positioned further forward, and very wide buccal or cheek teeth.
