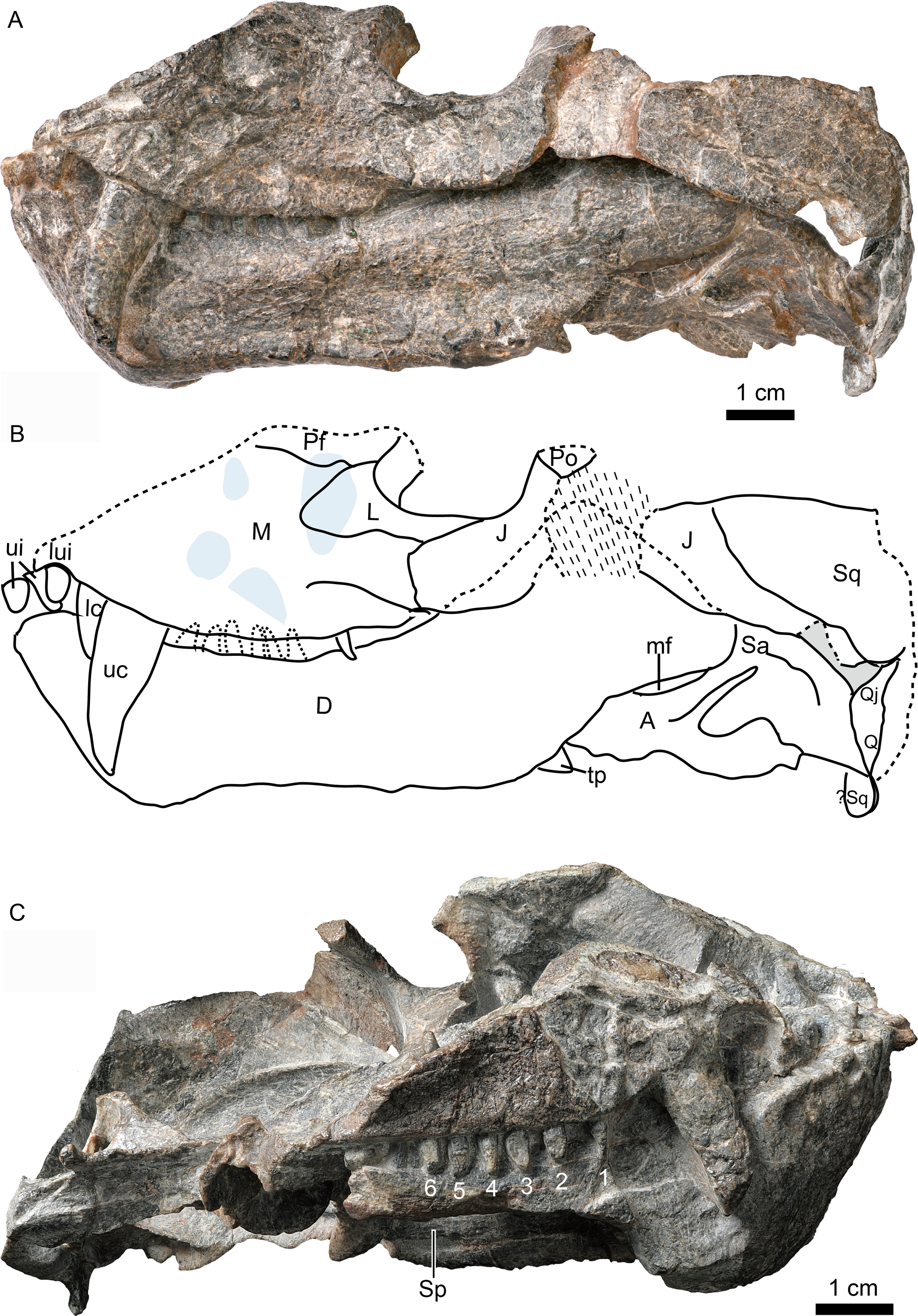
- Holotype skull seen from the left and right sides

Scientific classification
- Kingdom: Animalia
- Phylum: Chordata
- Clade: Synapsida
- Clade: Therapsida
- Clade: †Therocephalia
- Clade: †Eutherocephalia
- Genus: †Caodeyao; Liu & Abdala, 2020
- Species: †C. liuyufengi

Binomial name
- †Caodeyao liuyufengi Liu & Abdala, 2020

= Caodeyao =

Caodeyao Temporal range: Lopingian?

Genus of therapsid from Permian China

Caodeyao is a genus of therocephalian that lived in what is now China during the late Permian. It was found in the Naobaogou Formation. It contains one species, Caodeyao liuyufengi, named in 2020 by Jun Liu and Fernando Abdala. The authors found that its closest relative is Purlovia from Russia, forming with it an exclusively Laurasian clade.

The holotype and only specimen consisted of a partial skull and a humerus. It was a medium sized animal with a 14 cm long skull. It had a short but high snout, and wide temporal openings.

== Etymology ==
The genus name refers to the village of Caodeyao, while the specific epithet refers to Liu Yu-Feng, the technician and driver who made significant contributions to the Daqingshan field trips.

== Gallery ==
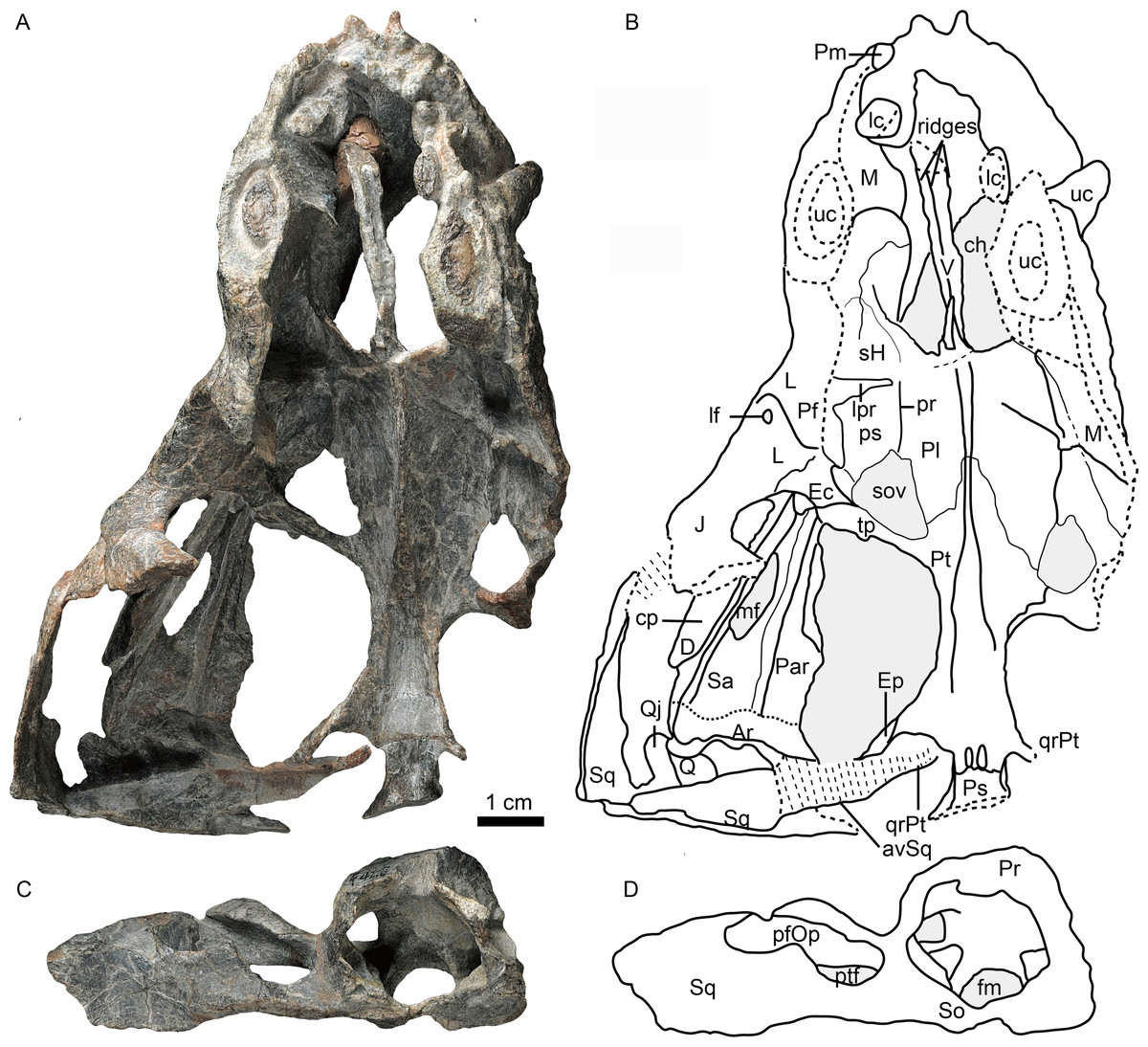
Skull (dorsal view)

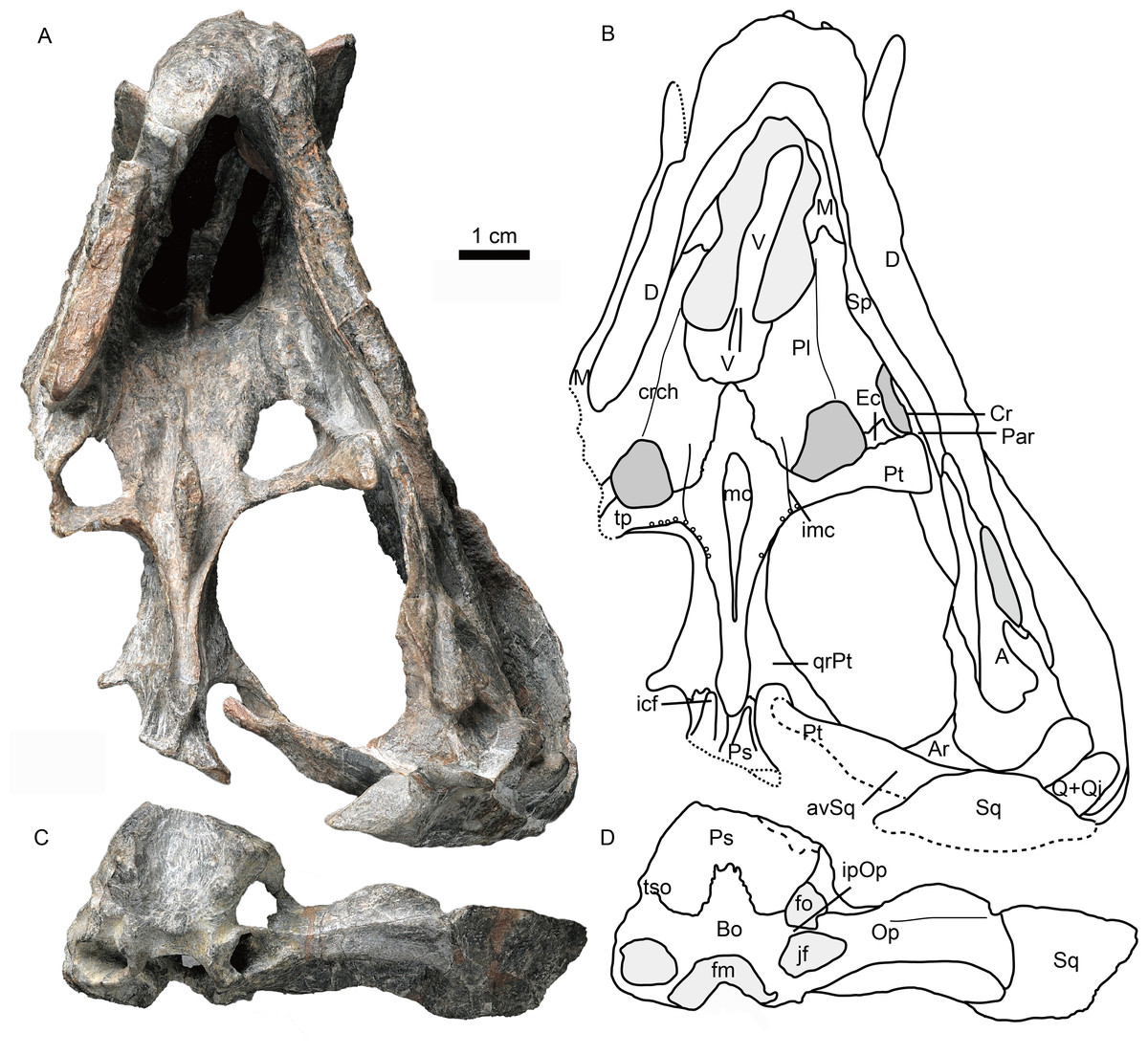
Skull (ventral view)

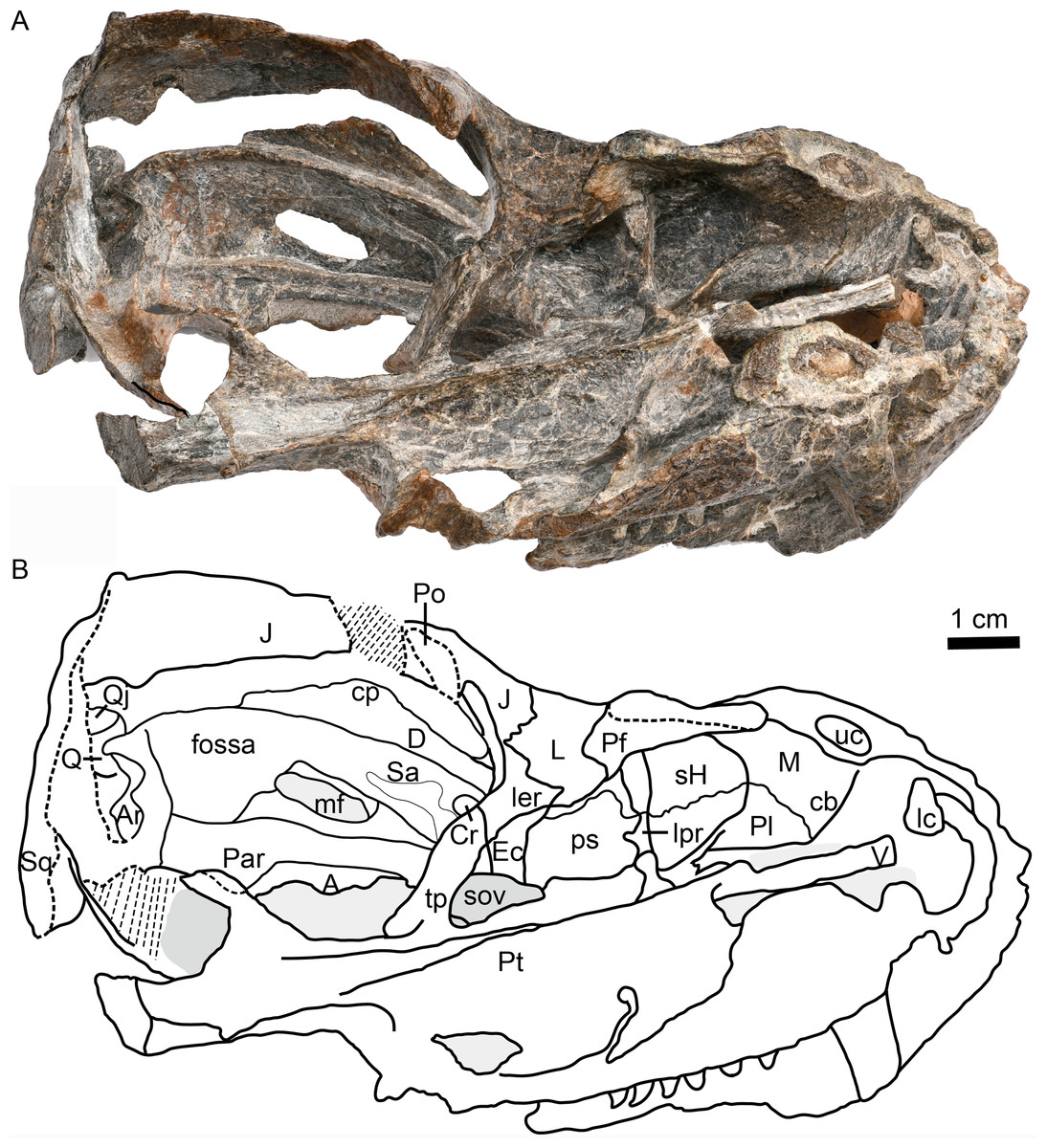
Skull with mandibles

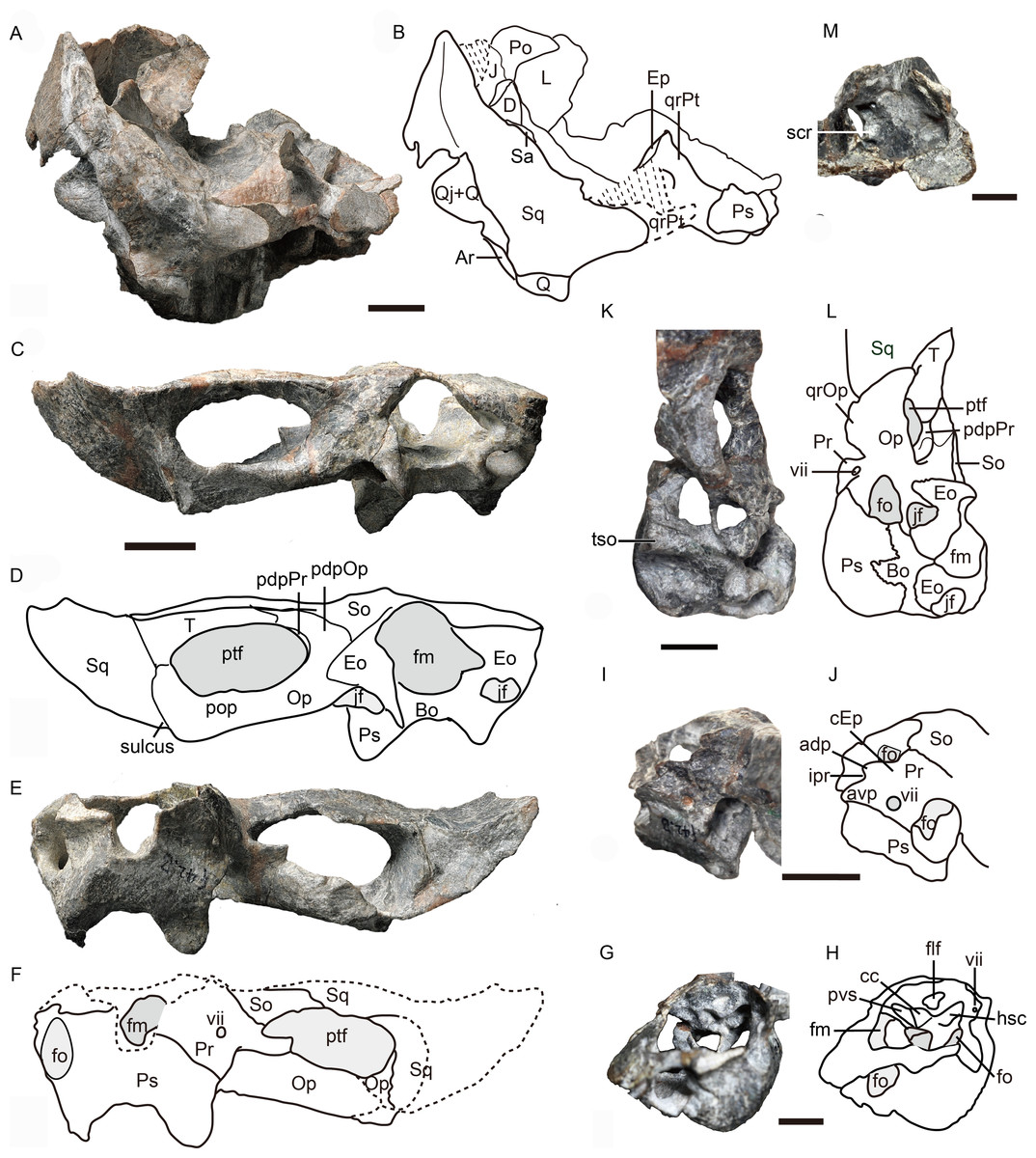
Skull, posterior view (A-B). Occiput, posterior view (C-D) Occiput, anterior view (E-F) Braincase (G-M)

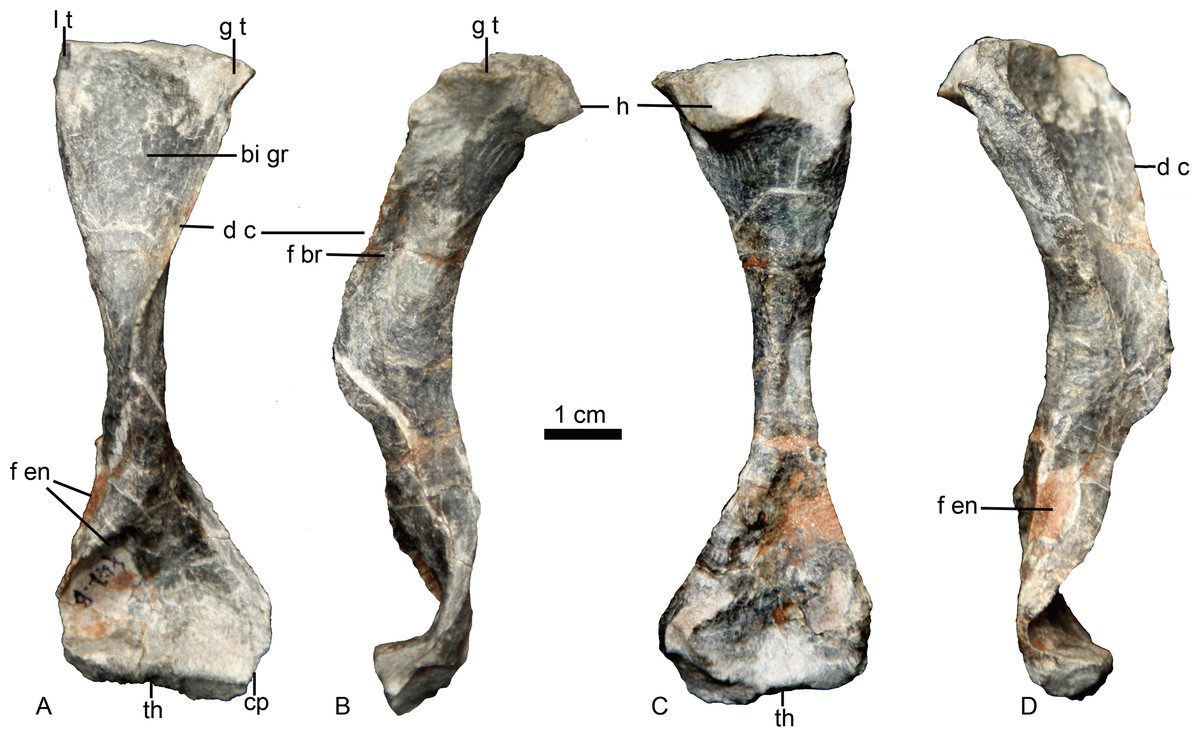
Left humerus in (A) ventral, (B) anterolateral, (C) dorsal, and (D) posteromedial views.

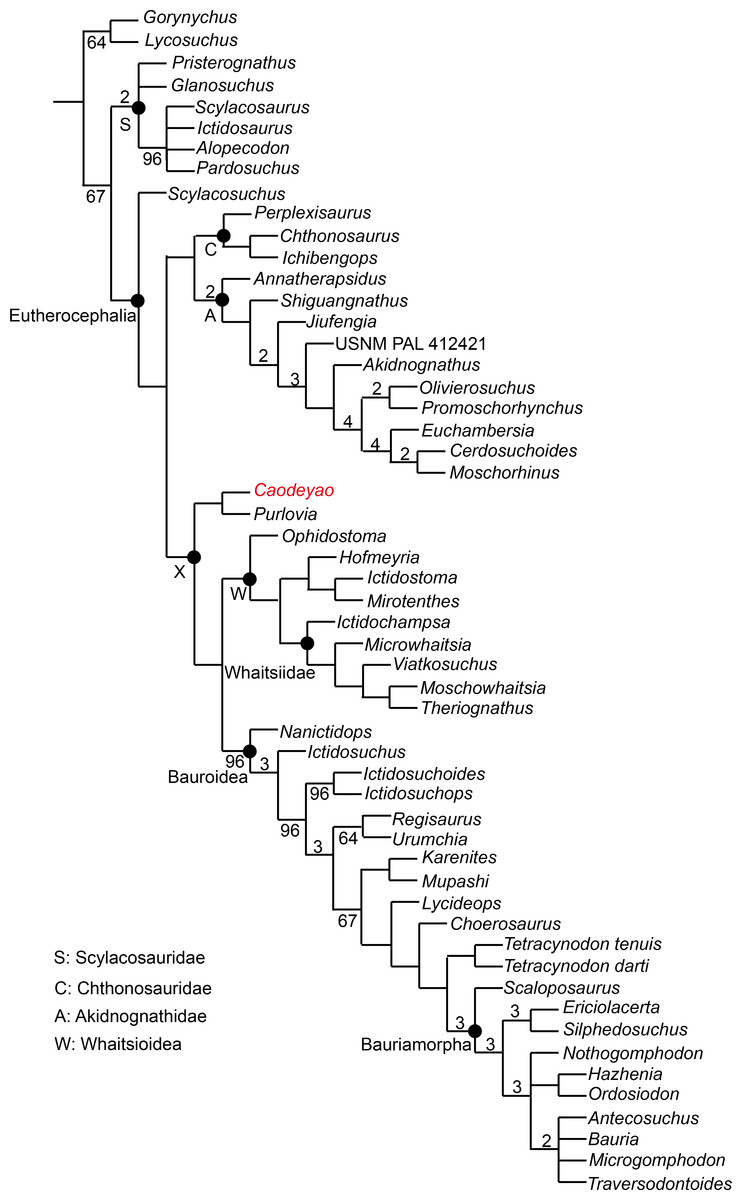
Major consensus tree of Therocephalia (Liu and Abdala, 2020)
