= Antecosuchus =

Antecosuchus Temporal range: Middle Triassic, 247–242 Ma

Scientific classification
- Domain: Eukaryota
- Kingdom: Animalia
- Phylum: Chordata
- Clade: Synapsida
- Clade: Therapsida
- Clade: †Therocephalia
- Family: †Bauriidae
- Subfamily: †Bauriinae
- Genus: †Antecosuchus; L. P. Tatarinov, 1973

Type species
- Antecosuchus ochevi Tatarinov, 1973

Species
- †V. ochevi Tatarinov, 1973; †V. boreus Tatarinov, 1973

Extinct genus of therapsids

Antecosuchus is an extinct genus of bauriid therocephalians.

== See also ==
- List of therapsids
