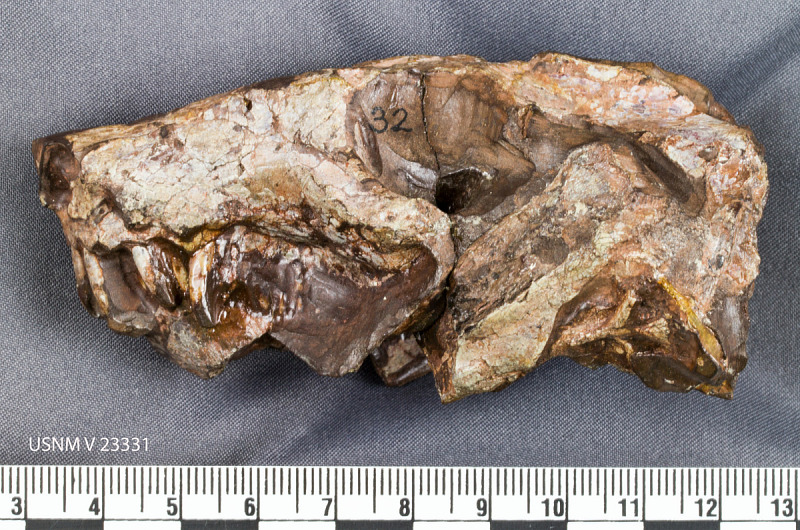
- Skull of B. cynops

Scientific classification
- Domain: Eukaryota
- Kingdom: Animalia
- Phylum: Chordata
- Clade: Synapsida
- Clade: Therapsida
- Clade: †Therocephalia
- Family: †Bauriidae
- Subfamily: †Bauriinae
- Genus: †Bauria; Broom 1909

Type species
- Bauria cynops Broom 1909

Other species
- Bauria robusta Harksen, 1966

= Bauria =

Bauria Temporal range: Early - Middle Triassic, 251–246 Ma

Genus of therapsids from the Early Triassic of South Africa

Bauria is an extinct genus of the suborder Therocephalia that existed during the Early and Middle Triassic period, around 246-251 million years ago. It belonged to the family Bauriidae. Bauria was probably a herbivore or omnivore. It lived in South Africa, specifically in the Burgersdorp Formation in South Africa.

== Taxonomy ==
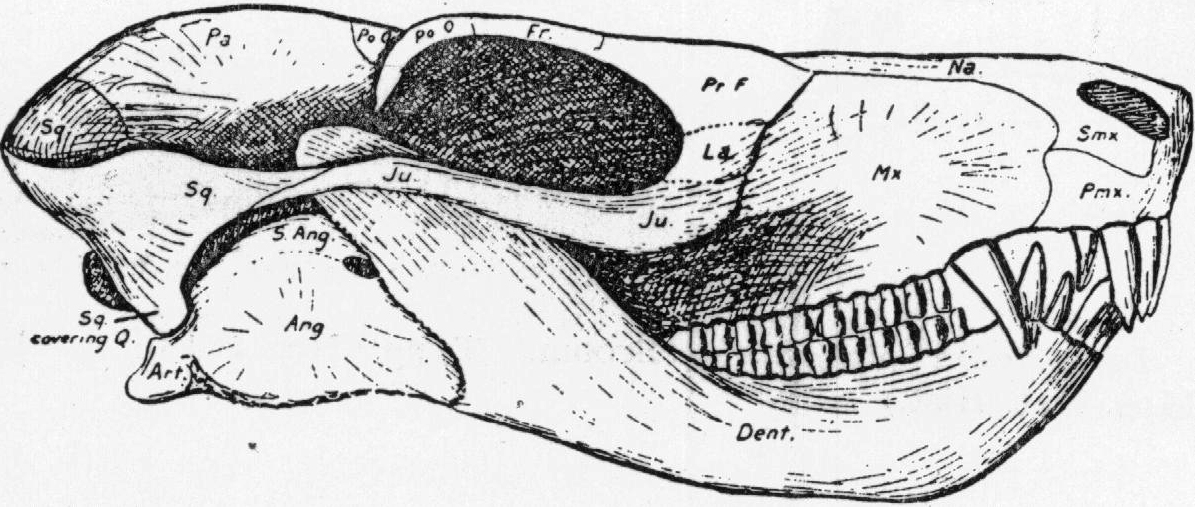
Reconstruction of B. cynops skull specimen 5622 from 1915

Bauria was named by Robert Broom in 1909 and found at Winnaarsbaken, South Africa. The first species Broom discovered, Bauria cynops, was a reasonably complete skull, but according to the first description somewhat poorly preserved, and apparently equally poorly prepared. Five other specimens were later found at different points in time, with mostly skulls being found.

There have only been two known species of Bauria that have been discovered so far, with the first species, Bauria cynops, being known from 6 different skulls in varying conditions of poor to excellent.

The second species, Bauria robusta is known from a skull that is as much as twenty percent larger than the largest known specimen of Bauria cynops, which is about fifteen percent larger than the average of all other specimens of this genotype. The skull was unfortunately not well preserved, due to exposure to weathering. The only tangible evidence of a feature which is quite apparent to the eye is the fact that the snout appears to be stouter, higher and shorter than in Bauria cynops. The cheek bulges in other Bauria specimens are below the anterior borders of the orbits, while in the new species they rise to a position more directly in front of the orbits.

Only two species of Bauria are known, with the most recent one, Bauria robusta, being discovered by J. W. Kitching in 1955 in the Burghersdorp district However, a 2013 study proposed that Microgomphodon oligocynus and Bauria cynops are recognized as the only valid species of southern African bauriids.

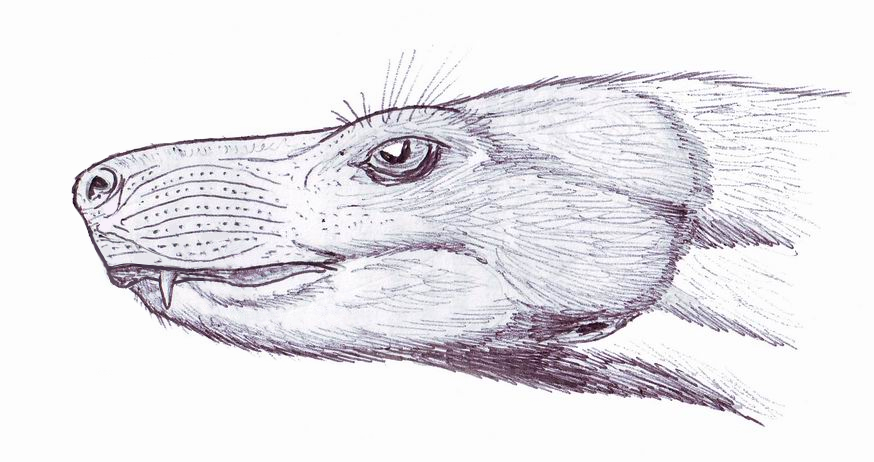
B. cynops head restoration

- Synapsida
  - † Caseasauria
  - Sphenacodontia
    - † Sphenacodontidae
    - Therapsida
      - † Tetraceratops
      - - † Biarmosuchia
          - † Eotitanosuchidae
          - † Phthinosuchidae
        - Eutherapsida
          - † Dinocephalia
            - † Anteosauria
            - † Tapinocephalia
          - Neotherapsida
            - † Anomodontia
              - † Dromasauria
              - † Dicynodontia
            - Theriodontia
              - † Gorgonopsia
                - † Lycaenops
                - † Inostrancevia
              - Eutheriodontia
                - † Therocephalia
                  - † Eutherocephalia
                    - † Bauria
                - Cynodontia
                  - Mammalia

Based on Brink's analysis of skull and lower jaw features in 1963, Bauria is a therapsid sufficiently different from Scaloposaurus and its allies to warrant distinction at the infraorder level. It was suggested that a suborder be recognized level with Gorgonopsia, Therocephalia, Cynodontia and Ictidosauria and that this suborder be called Scaloposauria. The suborder Scaloposauria should be divided into two infraorders, the earlier Ictodosuchoidea and the later Bauriamorpha, a natural branch separate from the suborder Cynodontia.

Bauria was later confirmed to be a sister taxon of cynodonts, followed by an outgroup formed by (Moschorhinus (Ictidosuchops, Theriognathus)), using techniques involving Most Parsimonious Trees.

Most therocephalian genera lack an ectepicondylar foramen, with Bauria being the only exception, making Bauria a derived genera.

== Description ==
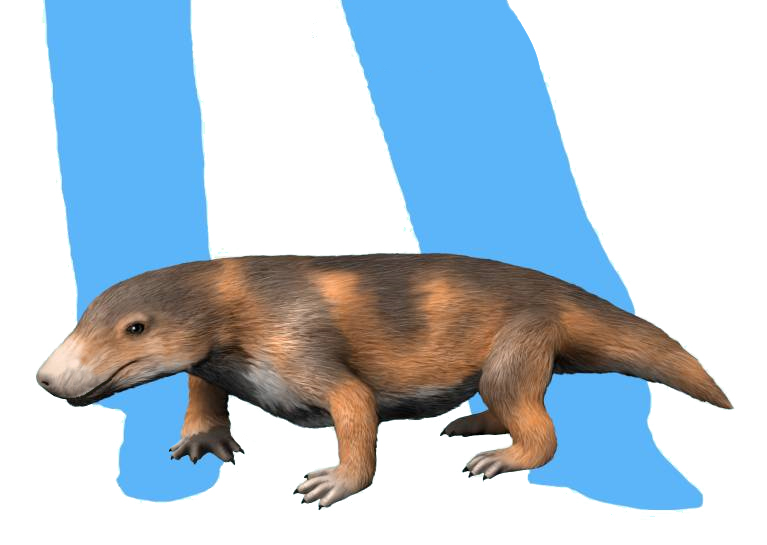
Size of B. cynops compared to a human Restoration

=== Skull ===
According to what Brink compiled, the basioccipital of Bauria contributes in the typical therocephalian-scaloposaurid manner to the occipital condyle. In Bauria, the three exoccipitals are of equal size. The shape of the rest of the basioccipital in ventral view doesn't differ too much from other related forms like Ictidosuchops. The opisthotic contribution is visible in ventral view. There is the presence of bosses on the exoccipitals, dorsally and laterally, which mark the areas of articulation of the proatlas. The parietals form a parietal crest, in contrast with the slightly broader, more rounded ictidosuchoid condition. The fronto-parietal suture is narrow in Bauria, which differs from ictidosuchids who have a generally broader region The pineal foramen is absent, a feature of considerable significance at this critical level near the threshold of homoiotherm mammals. The postorbitals are very characteristic, making it possible to identify Bauria on one isolated postorbital bone. The posterior extensions flanking the parietals do not extend upward, the postorbital frontal sutures form no ridges, unlike in ictidosuchoids.

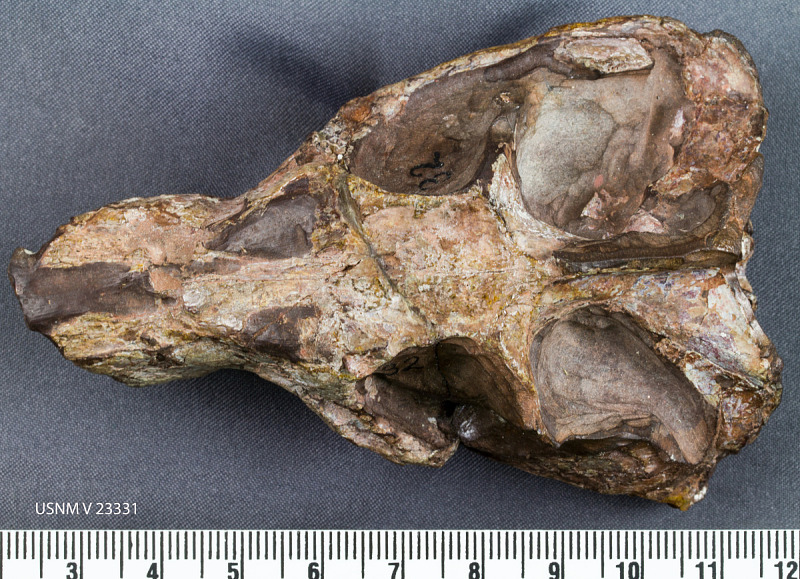
B. cynops skull from above

The dentary is peculiarly curved, making it a characteristic of this genus. The peculiar twist is designed to swing the posterior lower cheek teeth inward to ensure proper occlusion on the upper teeth. The dentary is greatly thickened, both internally and externally along the series of cheek teeth, much more than the transversely broadened teeth and their roots demand. The posterior part of the dental row is displaced inward so the dorsal margin of the coronoid process descends some distance laterally to the hindmost teeth and continues down and forward across the lateral face of the dentary virtually to the chin. This arrangement gives the dentary a very mammal-like or ictidosaur appearance, but the coronoid process is by contrast typically scaloposaurid. It reaches far back and high through the temporal vacuity, but as a long slender extension, somewhat square terminally. There are three large incisors, one short canine only slightly larger than the incisors, and it would appear that the cheek teeth normally count one more than in the upper jaw. The lower teeth are narrower than the upper teeth, but are still distinctly transversely ovate. All the teeth in the series are twice as wide as their antero-posterior measurement. The therocephalian Bauria shows a more complex postcanine crown pattern, but only one cusp can be seen in labial view

== Palaeobiology ==
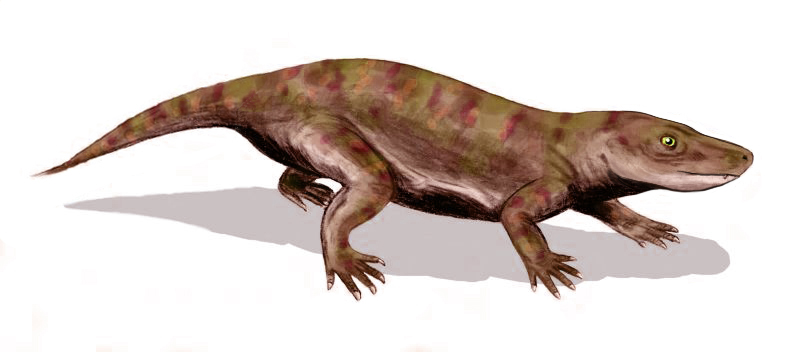
Life restoration showing B. cynops without fur

The diet of Bauria is assumed to have included tough fibrous material due to the way the anterior edge of an upper tooth shears against the posterior edge of the corresponding lower tooth to generate a cutting action.

The cheek bulges, and the wide and deep depression below them, suggest a muscular arrangement associated with the corners of the mouth, whereby it is possible for such an animal to pull the corners of the mouth forwards as is characteristic of mammals, while in true reptiles the corners of the mouth are fixed and very close to the articulation of the lower jaw. This is a significant arrangement, because even with a secondary palate an animal would not be able to suck unless the corners of the mouth can be brought forward, allowing the mouth as a whole to close properly around the teat of a milk gland.

== See also ==
- Therocephalia
- Synapsid
