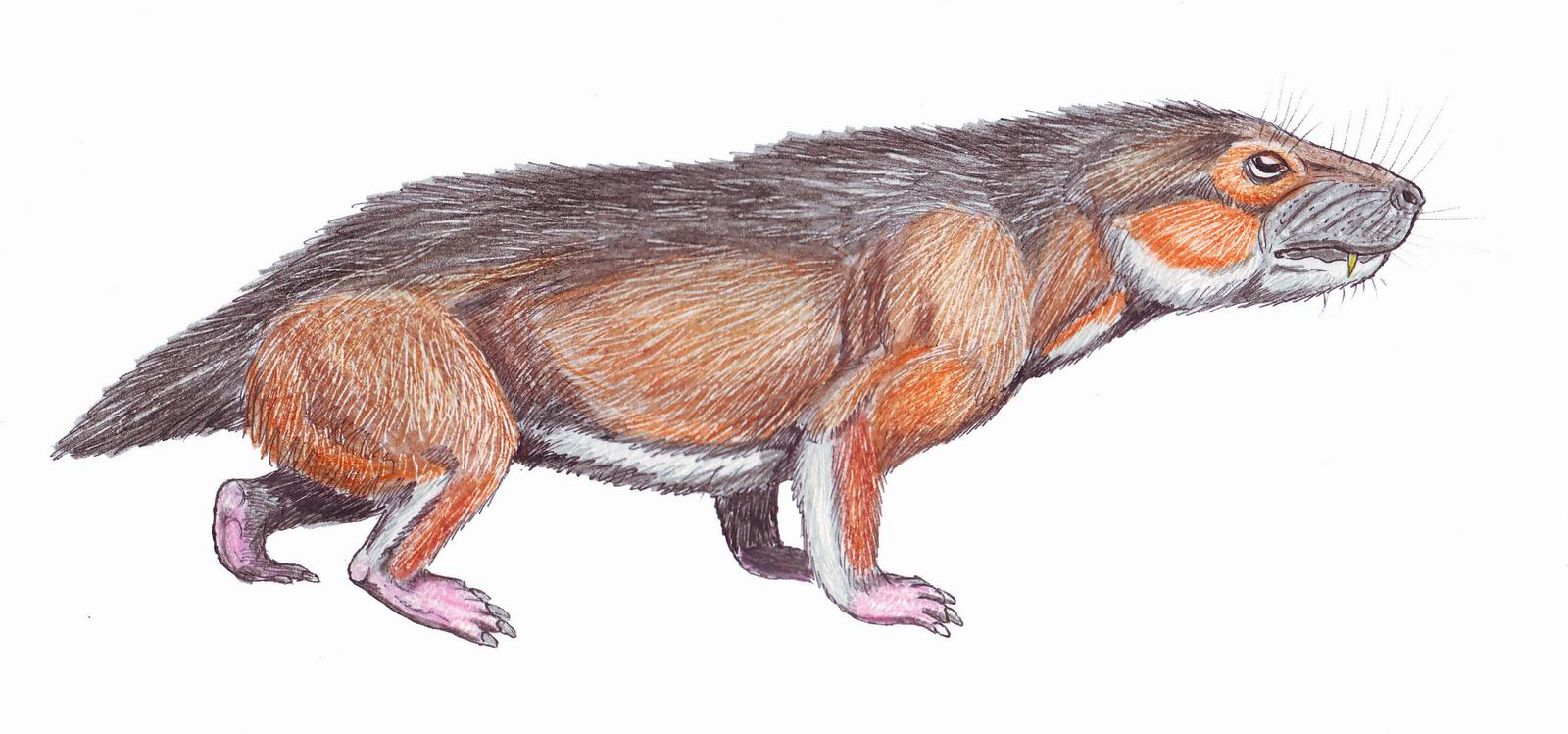
- Life restoration of Microgomphodon oligocynus

Scientific classification
- Domain: Eukaryota
- Kingdom: Animalia
- Phylum: Chordata
- Clade: Synapsida
- Clade: Therapsida
- Clade: †Therocephalia
- Family: †Bauriidae
- Genus: †Microgomphodon; Seeley, 1895

Type species
- †Microgomphodon oligocynus Seeley, 1895

Synonyms
- Genus-level: Sesamodon Broom, 1905; Melinodon Broom, 1905; Bauria Broom, 1909; Watsoniella Broili and Schröder, 1935; Herpetogale Keyser and Brink, 1977; Species-level: Sesamodon browni Broom, 1905; Melinodon simus Broom, 1905; Bauria cynops Broom, 1909; Watsoniella breviceps Broili and Schröder, 1935; Herpetogale marsupialis Keyser and Brink, 1977

= Microgomphodon =

Microgomphodon Temporal range: Middle Triassic, Olenekian–Anisian

Genus of therapsid from the Middle Triassic of southern Africa

Microgomphodon is an extinct genus of therocephalian therapsid from the Middle Triassic of South Africa and Namibia. Only one species of Microgomphodon, M. oligocynus, is currently recognized. With fossils present in the Cynognathus Assemblage Zone (CAZ) of the Burgersdorp Formation in South Africa and Omingonde Formation of Namibia and ranging in age from late Olenekian to Anisian, it is one of the most geographically and temporally widespread therocephalian species. Moreover, its occurrence in the upper Omigonde Formation of Namibia makes Microgomphodon the latest-surviving therocephalian. Microgomphodon is a member of the family Bauriidae and a close relative of Bauria, another South African bauriid from the CAZ. Like other bauriids, it possesses several mammal-like features such as a secondary palate and broad, molar-like postcanine teeth, all of which evolved independently from mammals.

== Description ==
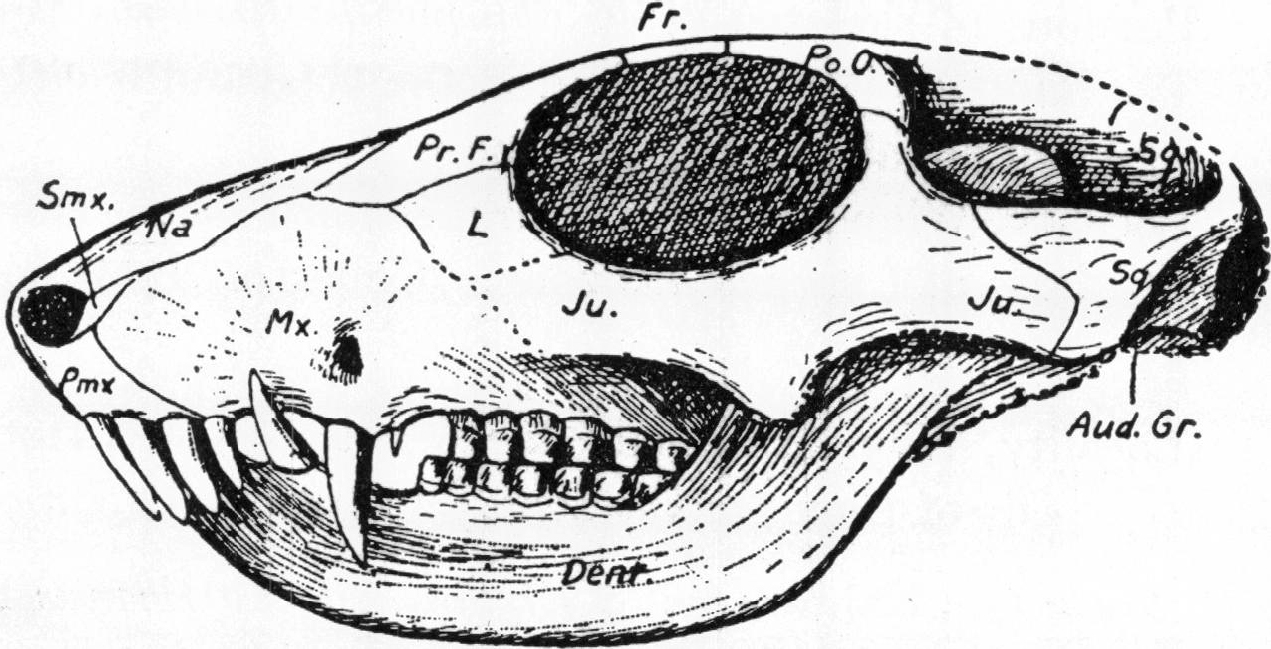
Illustration of the skull of Microgomphodon oligocynus, based on specimen AMNH FARB 5517, originally described as Sesamodon browni

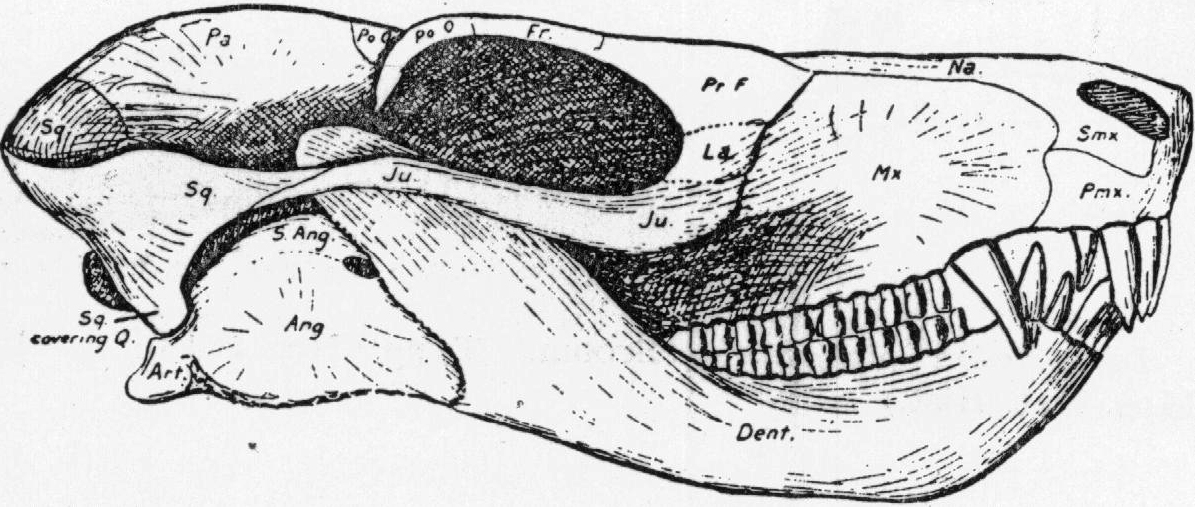
Illustration of the skull of Bauria cynops, based on specimen AMNH FARB 5622

Microgomphodon has a short snout and large eye sockets that are roughly equal in size to the temporal openings behind them (these openings are typically much larger in therocephalians). Its incisors are large and pointed, with the lower set splaying forward from the lower jaw. A pair of enlarged canines in the upper jaw separates the incisors in the front from the postcanines in the back. The postcanine teeth are widened and bear cusps that interlock with the postcanines of the lower jaw. They are positioned closer to the midlines of the upper and lower jaws than are the incisors due to an inward expansion of the maxilla and dentary bones.

Microgomphodon is very similar in appearance to Bauria, but differs in having a small hole called a pineal foramen at the top of the skull behind the eye sockets, a complete postorbital bar enclosing the eye sockets from behind, fewer postcanine teeth, and canines located further back along the upper jaw. Additionally, the two taxa can be distinguished by many subtle differences relating to the shape of the skull. For example, Microgomphodon has a deeper snout, slightly larger eyes, and a sharper angle to the zygomatic arches than does Bauria. Specimens of Microgomphodon are generally smaller than those of Bauria; the largest skull of Microgomphodon is 89 millimetres (3.5 in) long whereas the largest of Bauria is 130 millimetres (5.1 in).

== Geographic and temporal distribution ==
Most fossils of Microgomphodon come from the Karoo Basin of South Africa. Skulls of Microgomphodon have been found in two regions within the country: one southwest of Lesotho spanning the border between the Free State and the Eastern Cape and another northeast of Lesotho within the Free State near its border with KwaZulu-Natal. Fossil localities in the first region contain both Microgomphodon and Bauria remains, while localities in the second contain only Microgomphodon. A skull of Microgomphodon has also been found in the upper Omingonde Formation in Namibia.

The oldest occurrence of Microgomphodon is in Subzone A of the Cynognathus Assemblage Zone, that dates to the Late Olenekian. Microgomphodon continues into Subzone B of the CAZ, which dates to the Anisian. The youngest specimen of Microgomphodon that is known is the skull from Namibia, found in the upper part of the Omingonde Formation near its contact with the overlying Etjo Formation. The specimen is not only the youngest of Microgomphodon but the youngest of any therocephalian, making Microgomphodon the latest-surviving member of the group.
