= Traversodontoides =

Traversodontoides Temporal range: Middle Triassic

Scientific classification
- Kingdom: Animalia
- Phylum: Chordata
- Clade: Synapsida
- Clade: Therapsida
- Clade: †Therocephalia
- Family: †Bauriidae
- Genus: †Traversodontoides; Yang, 1974
- Species: †T. wangwuensis

Binomial name
- †Traversodontoides wangwuensis Yang, 1974

Extinct genus of therapsids

Traversodontoides is an extinct genus of therocephalian therapsids known from the Triassic of China. The genus contains a single species, Traversodontoides wangwuensis, known from a nearly complete skull and mandible, in addition to a partial skeleton.
