= Nothogomphodon =

Nothogomphodon Temporal range: Anisian 247.2–242 Ma

Scientific classification
- Kingdom: Animalia
- Phylum: Chordata
- Clade: Synapsida
- Clade: Therapsida
- Clade: †Therocephalia
- Family: †Bauriidae
- Subfamily: †Nothogomphodontinae; Tatarinov, 1974
- Genus: †Nothogomphodon; Tatarinov, 1974

Type species
- Nothogomphodon danilovi Tatarinov, 1974

Species
- †N. danilovi Tatarinov, 1974 (type); †N. sanjiaoensis Liu & Abdala, 2015

Genus of therapsids of the early Triassic

Nothogomphodon is a genus of therocephalian therapsids. It is classified within the family Bauriidae and placed within its own subfamily, Nothogomphodontinae.

== Description ==
Nothogomphodon was unusual among therocephalians for its sectorial dentition, a feature it shared with cynodonts and which would have allowed it to shear meat more effectively.

== Species ==
There are two described species of Nothogomphodon: N. danilovi and N. sanjiaoensis. N. danilovi is the types species and is known from Russia, while N. sanjiaoensis is known from China. N. sanjiaoensis can be distinguished from N. danilovi by its ovate canine base and distinct gap between the canine and the first postcanine tooth.
