= Ordosiodon =

Ordosiodon Temporal range: Early Triassic

Scientific classification
- Kingdom: Animalia
- Phylum: Chordata
- Clade: Synapsida
- Clade: Therapsida
- Clade: †Therocephalia
- Superfamily: †Baurioidea
- Genus: †Ordosiodon; Young, 1961

Species
- †O. lincheyuensis Young, 1961 (type); †O. youngi (Hou, 1979 [originally Ordosia youngi])

Genus of therapsids from the Early Triassic of China

Ordosiodon is an extinct genus of therocephalian therapsids from the Early Triassic of China. It includes two species, O. lincheyuensis and O. youngi.

O. lincheyuensis, the type species, was named by Chinese paleontologist C. C. Young (Yang Zhongjian) in 1961 on the basis of a partial lower jaw. The jaw was discovered by a petroleum survey team in October 1958 from the Lower Ermaying Formation in Shanxi Province, which dates back to the Olenekian stage. Young named the genus after the Ordos Desert, the region where the jaw was found. Ordosiodon was originally identified as a type of diademodontid by Young (diademodontids are herbivorous cynodonts that are much more closely related to mammals than are therocephalians). Young noted several unusual features of Ordosiodon that set it apart from diademodontids, including the lack of a diastema or gap in the teeth, the lack of molar-like sectorial teeth at the back of the jaw, conical caniniform teeth, and relatively small postcaniniform teeth. Ordosiodon was later identified as a juvenile diademodontid to account for these differences.

In 1979 a partial skull and skeleton was found from the same area as O. lincheyuensis and named Ordosia youngi in honor of Young. O. youngi was identified as a therocephalian and placed in the family Ordosiidae. Distinguishing characteristics of O. youngi include an elongated secondary palate on the underside of the skull, a short snout, and a temporal (cheek) region that is wider than the back of the skull. The postcaniniform teeth increase in size farther back in the jaws.

In 1981 the jaw of Ordosiodon was recognized as that of a therocephalian similar to Ordosia youngi. Ordosia became a synonym of Ordosiodon and Ordosia youngi was reclassified as Ordosiodon youngi. The names Ordosia and Ordosiidae are now occupied by a genus and family of Cambrian trilobites.
