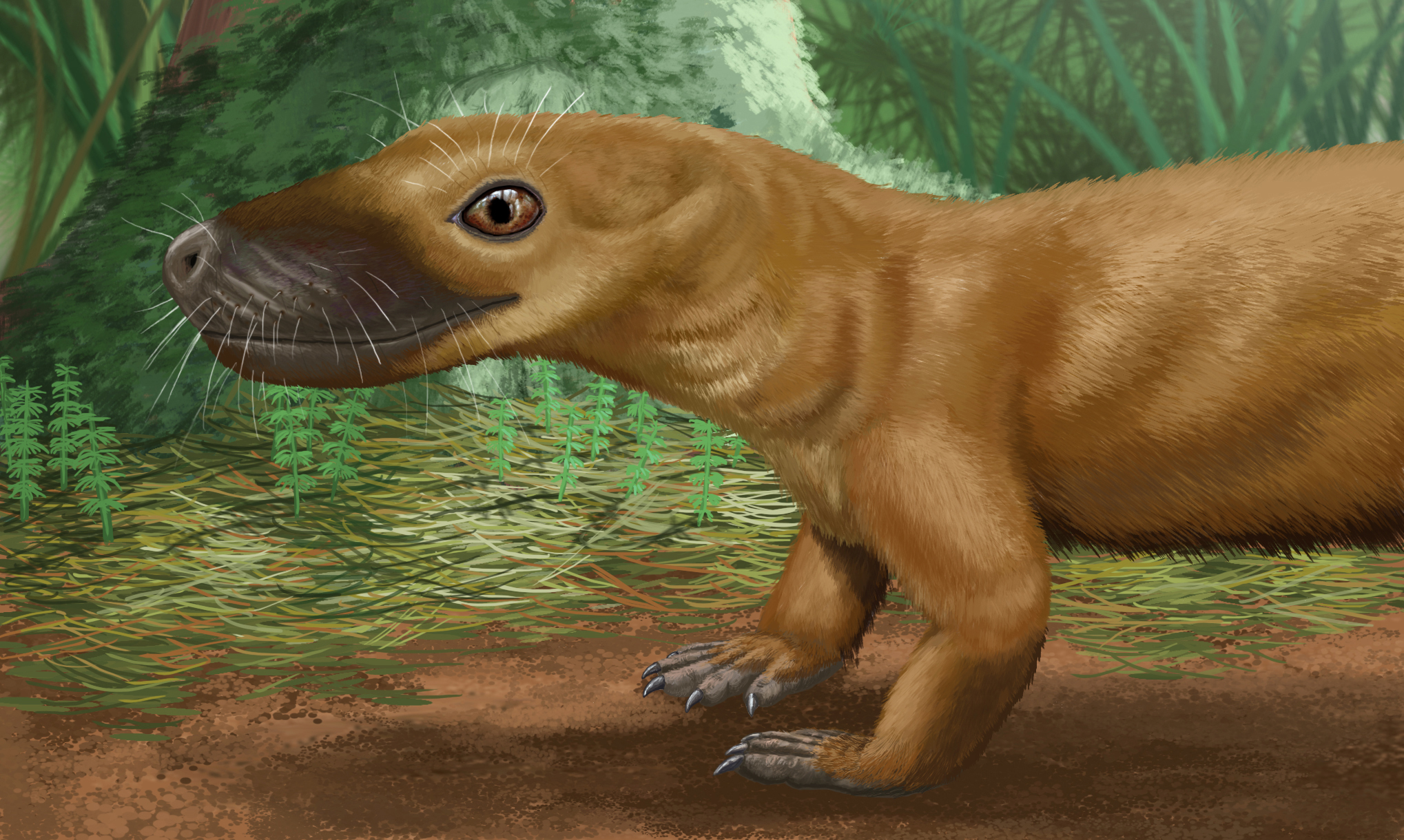
- An illustration of Silphedosuchus, a member of the Ericiolacertidae

Scientific classification
- Domain: Eukaryota
- Kingdom: Animalia
- Phylum: Chordata
- Clade: Synapsida
- Clade: Therapsida
- Clade: †Therocephalia
- Clade: †Scylacosauria
- Clade: †Eutherocephalia
- Superfamily: †Baurioidea
- Family: †Ericiolacertidae; Watson and Romer 1956

Genera
- Ericiolacerta; Pedaeosaurus; Silphedosuchus

= Ericiolacertidae =

Ericiolacertidae Temporal range: Early Triassic

Extinct family of therapsids

Ericiolacertidae is a family of therocephalian therapsids. The family living in the earliest Triassic after the Permian-Triassic extinction event. Genera are: Ericiolacerta found in the Fremouw Formation of Antarctica and the Normandien Formation of South Africa, Pedaeosaurus found in the Fremouw Formation of Antarctica and Silphedosuchus, from the Petropavlovka Formation of Russia, east of the Urals. The family is composed of carnivores.
