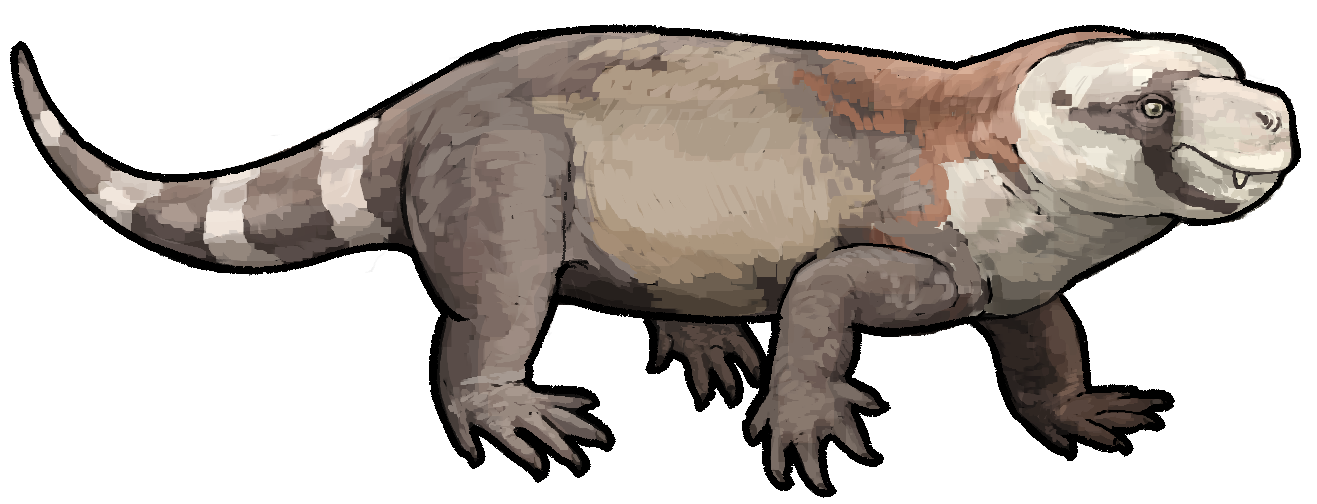
- Life Restoration

Scientific classification
- Kingdom: Animalia
- Phylum: Chordata
- Clade: Synapsida
- Clade: Therapsida
- Clade: Cynodontia
- Clade: Epicynodontia
- Genus: †Vetusodon; Abdala et al., 2019
- Species: †V. elikhulu

Binomial name
- †Vetusodon elikhulu Abdala et al., 2019

= Vetusodon =

Vetusodon Temporal range: Late Permian (Changhsingian), ~253–252 Ma

Extinct genus of cynodonts

Vetusodon is an extinct genus of cynodonts belonging to the clade Epicynodontia. It contains one species, Vetusodon elikhulu, which is known from four specimens found in the Late Permian Daptocephalus Assemblage Zone of South Africa. With a skull length of about 18 centimetres (7.1 in), Vetusodon is the largest known cynodont from the Permian. Through convergent evolution, it possessed several unusual features reminiscent of the contemporary therocephalian Moschorhinus, including broad, robust jaws, large incisors and canines, and small, single-cusped postcanine teeth.

== Discovery and naming ==
Vetusodon is known from four specimens, all of which have been collected in South Africa from rocks belonging to the Daptocephalus Assemblage Zone. The holotype, BP/1/7971, consists of a well-preserved skull missing the lower jaw. It was discovered in 2010 in a mudstone bed in the province of KwaZulu-Natal by a team led by the palaeontologist Bruce S. Rubidge. The referred specimen CGP GHG141 was found in 1985 by Gideon Groenewald in the Thaba Nchu Mountain of the Free State province, and like the holotype, it consists of a partial skull missing the lower jaw. The specimen SAM-PK-K10596 is the least complete of the specimens, consisting only of a snout. It was found in 1958 or 1959 by the South African palaeontologist Alfred W. Crompton. The specimen SAM-PK-K10702 is the most complete of the four specimens, and comprises a complete skull with an intact lower jaw. It was discovered in 2009 or 2010 by Derik Wolvaardt at the Ripplemead Farm, close to the town of Nieu-Bethesda, Eastern Cape province.

Vetusodon elikhulu was first described in 2019 by the palaeontologists Fernando Abdala, Leandro C. Gaetano, Roger M. H. Smith and Bruce S. Rubidge. Its generic name is derived from the Latin word vetus, meaning "old", and the Greek word οδοντος (odontos), meaning "tooth". The specific name elikhulu means "large" in the Zulu language, and alludes to the animal's size.

== Description ==
Vetusodon is the largest known Permian cynodont, based on its skull length of around 18 centimetres (7.1 in). The temporal region (area behind the eye sockets) made up around 60 percent of the skull length.

The jaws were quite robust, and the snout was unusually broad compared to other cynodonts of its time. Between the nostrils was a bony internarial process that was formed by the premaxillae and nasal bones. This process was somewhat forwards-pointing, giving the tip of the snout a pointed shape when seen from above. The back portion of the nostrils were formed by small bones known as the septomaxillae; these bones bore a thin extension (the intranarial process) that nearly divided each nostril into two halves. There was a small hole (the septomaxillary foramen) where the septomaxilla met with the maxilla. The nasal bones made up the upper part of the snout, and extended backwards as far as the rear end of the eye sockets, where they met with the frontal bones. The sides of the snout were largely formed by the maxillae. The maxilla bore two rows of foramina (holes) with a diameter of around 2–3 millimetres (0.079–0.118 in). The lower jaw was formed primarily by the dentary bones, whereas the other (postdentary) bones were reduced in size to an extent not otherwise seen in cynodonts this primitive; as a result, the dentary stretched nearly as far back as the jaw joint. The symphysis (joint) between the two halves of the lower jaw was quite tall, creating a chin-like structure. Abdala et al. (2019) interpreted the symphysis as being fused, but a 2020 study by Huttenlocker and Sidor reinterpreted it as unfused. The back portion of the dentary had a projection called the coronoid process, which extended as high as the upper half of the eye sockets. The coronoid process fit quite closely to the postorbital bar (the bony structure that divided the eye socket from the temporal fenestra).

The teeth were conical, single-rooted and had no serrations. Vetusodon possessed four pairs of upper incisors, which were long and recurved. There was a small gap (diastema) between the last incisor and the canine. The upper canines were large and had a round, somewhat elongated cross-section. Behind the canines were a set of relatively small postcanine teeth. The upper postcanines varied in number between specimens, ranging from 7 pairs in the holotype, to 11 in the specimen SAM-PK-K10596. Unlike most cynodonts, which have postcanines with multiple cusps, the postcanines of Vetusodon only bore one cusp each.

The outer rims of the eye sockets (orbits) were formed by the lacrimal bones (in the front), prefrontal and postorbital bones (at the top), and the jugal bones (in the back and on the bottom). Between the eye sockets there was a large gap in the skull known as the interorbital vacuity. The zygomatic arches (the cheek bones, which made up the outer edge of the temporal fenestrae) were formed by the jugal and squamosal bones, and were quite tall, particularly towards the back. The upper edge of the zygomatic arch was rather thick, whereas the lower edge was thinner. Like other non-probainognathian cynodonts, Vetusodon possessed a hole known as the pineal foramen at the top of the skull, between the temporal fenestrae. Running from the top of the orbits towards the pineal foramen, and bordering the temporal fenestrae, were two crests formed by the postorbital bones. Behind the pineal foramen there was a longitudinal ridge known as the sagittal crest, which was unusually short in Vetusodon. Behind the sagittal crest, two occipital crests, formed by the tabular and squamosal bones, stretched backwards diagonally and joined the rear ends of the zygomatic arches.

The secondary palate (the structure making up the roof of the mouth in most cynodonts) was formed by the premaxillae, maxillae and palatine bones. In Vetusodon, the two halves of the secondary palate were not joined together in the middle, rendering the vomer prominently visible from below. Depending on the phylogenetic position of Vetusodon, this incomplete secondary palate may either be an autapomorphy (derived trait) of this taxon, or a plesiomorphy (ancestral trait) shared with other primitive cynodonts.

== Classification ==
When Vetusodon was first described in 2019, it was included in a phylogenetic analysis to test its relationships to other cynodonts. It was found to be a derived member of the clade Epicynodontia, being more closely related to Eucynodontia than several Triassic genera such as Thrinaxodon. As Thrinaxodon and its relatives had relatively well-developed secondary palates, this would imply that the incomplete secondary palate of Vetusodon was secondarily reduced from a more complete one. However, a 2020 study by Huttenlocker and Sidor, followed by a 2021 study by Pusch and colleagues, recovered Vetusodon in a more early-diverging position within Epicynodontia, as the sister taxon of the Permian genus Cynosaurus. If this placement is correct, the incomplete secondary palate of Vetusodon may be an ancestral trait inherited from earlier cynodonts.

Below are two cladograms from Abdala et al. (2019) and Pusch et al. (2021), which illustrate the varying phylogenetic placements of Vetusodon:

Abdala et al. (2019)

- Cynodontia
  - - Charassognathus
    - - Abdalodon
      - Dvinia
  - - Procynosuchus
    - Epicynodontia
      - Cynosaurus
      - - - Galesaurus
          - Progalesaurus
        - - - Thrinaxodon
            - - Nanictosaurus
              - Platycraniellus
          - - Vetusodon
            - Eucynodontia

Pusch et al. (2021)

- Cynodontia
  - - Dvinia
    - Charassognathidae
      - Abdalodon
      - Charassognathus
  - - Procynosuchus
    - Epicynodontia
      - - Galesaurus
        - Progalesaurus
      - - - Cynosaurus
          - Vetusodon
        - - Thrinaxodon
          - - Nanictosaurus
            - Platycraniellus
          - - Bolotridon
            - Eucynodontia

== Palaeobiology ==
The large incisors and canines and small, simple postcanines of Vetusodon imply that the front teeth played a larger role than the postcanines in the processing of food. In this respect it closely resembled the gorgonopsians and therocephalians, two other groups of synapsids that existed at the time, but differed from most other cynodonts, whose postcanines are generally the most complex and important teeth. The placement of the coronoid process of the dentary close to the postorbital bar may be evidence of a well-developed temporalis muscle, which would have allowed for a powerful bite by the front teeth. The skull shape and dentition of Vetusodon were in general similar to those of the therocephalian Moschorhinus, which it coexisted with. As therocephalians were only distantly related to Vetusodon, this is thought to be an instance of convergent evolution, where different groups that inhabit the same ecological niche evolve similar traits.

== Palaeoenvironment ==
Vetusodon belongs to the Daptocephalus Assemblage Zone, a biozone that is part of the Beaufort Group, which itself is part of the larger Karoo Supergroup. Vetusodon belongs to a subzone of the Daptocephalus AZ known as the Lystrosaurus maccaigi-Moschorhinus Subzone. The Lystrosaurus maccaigi-Moschorhinus subzone had notable changes in the fauna compared to the older Dicynodon-Theriognathus subzone. Gorgonopsians such as Rubidgea, the last rubidgeine, and Lyaencops, went extinct during a turnover event that separated the two subzones. Rubidgea would later be replaced by the Laurasian Inostrancevia. The turnover event also saw the extinction of dicynodonts such as Diictodon feliceps and Aulacephalodon baini. Additionally, the whaitsiid Theriognathus was absent from the upper proportion of the assemblage zone, being replaced by Moschorhinus. Following the turnover event, Lystrosaurus became more abundant within the fauna.

In addition to Vetusodon, several other synapsids are known from this subzone. These include the fellow cynodonts Cynosaurus and Nanictosaurus, the biarmosuchian Ictidorhinus, the dicynodonts Daptocephalus, Dicynodon, Dicynodontoides, Dinanomodon, Emydops, Emydorhinus, Kwazulusaurus, Lystrosaurus, Oudenodon, Pelanomodon and Thliptosaurus, the gorgonopsians Arctognathus, Cyonosaurus, and Inostrancevia africana, and the therocephalians Ictidosuchoides, Lycideops, Moschorhinus, Nanictidops, Promoschorhynchus, Polycynodon and Scaloporhinus. Other animals include the bivalve Palaeanodonta, the ray-finned fish Atherstonia and Namaichthys, the temnospondyls Rhinesuchus and Uranocentrodon and the reptiles Owenetta, Pareiasaurus and Spondylolestes.
