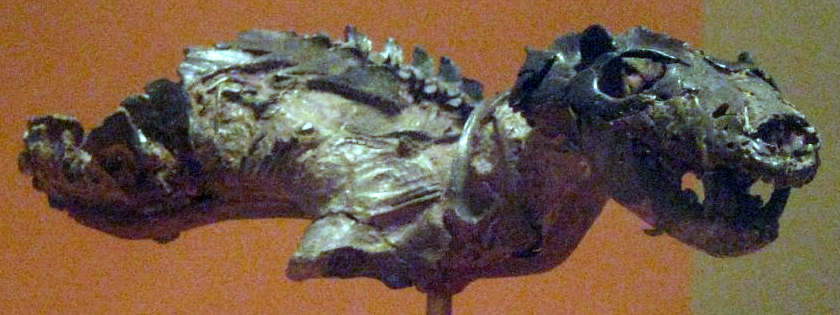
- Skeleton of Thrinaxodon liorhinus, a basal epicynodont
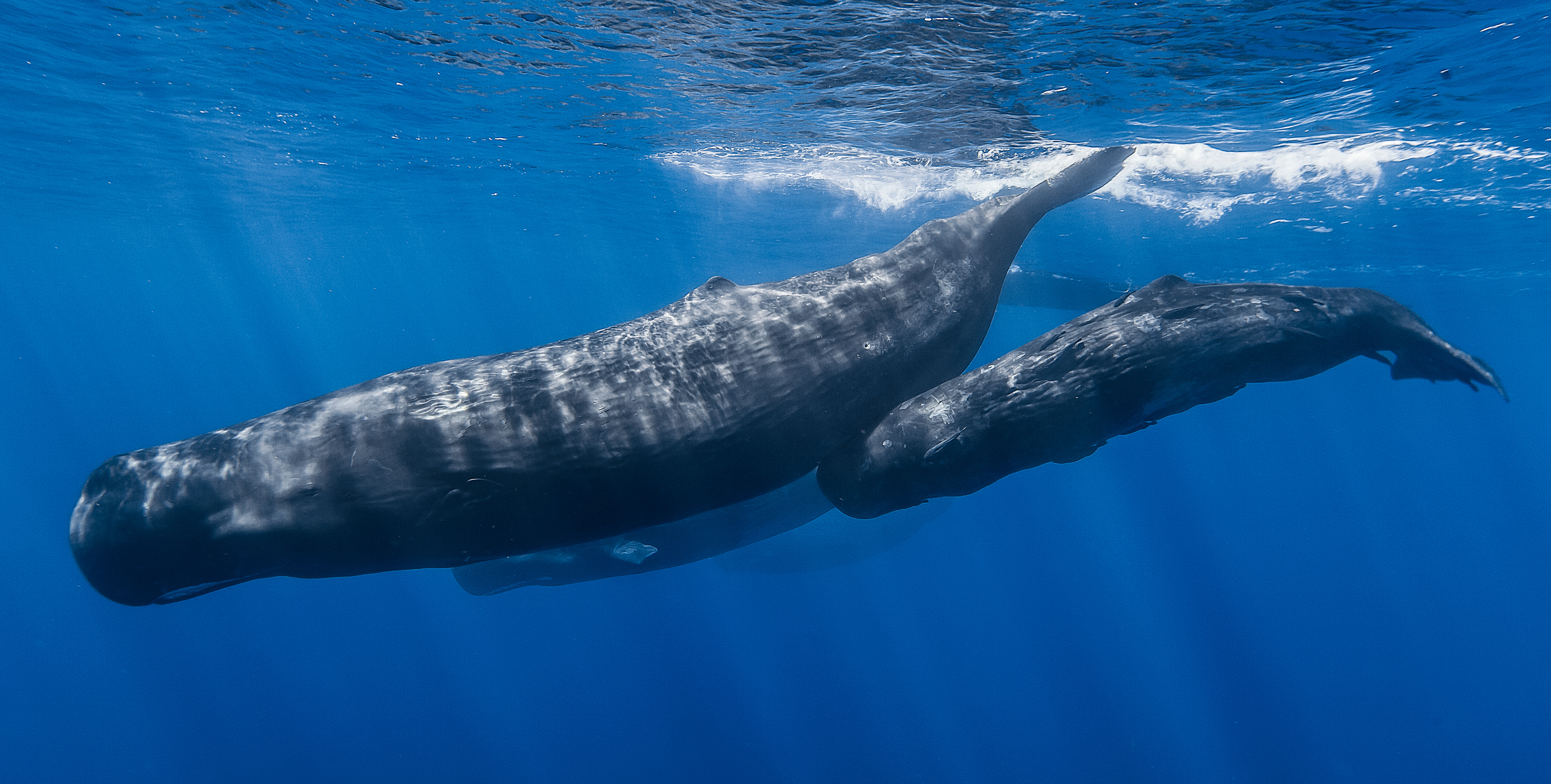
- Sperm whale, a modern-day epicynodont

Scientific classification
- Kingdom: Animalia
- Phylum: Chordata
- Clade: Synapsida
- Clade: Therapsida
- Clade: Cynodontia
- Clade: Epicynodontia; Hopson & Kitching, 2001

Subgroups
- †Bolotridon; †Cynosaurus; †Nanictosaurus; †Nythosaurus; †Platycraniellus; †Thrinaxodon; †Vetusodon; †Galesauridae; Eucynodontia

= Epicynodontia =

Epicynodontia Temporal range: Late Permian-Present, 259–0 Ma

Clade of cynodonts

Epicynodontia is a clade of cynodont therapsids that includes most cynodonts, such as galesaurids, thrinaxodontids, and Eucynodontia (including mammals). It was erected as a stem-based taxon by Hopson and Kitching (2001) and defined as the most inclusive clade containing Mammalia and excluding Procynosuchus, a Late Permian genus that is one of the most basal cynodonts.

Below is a cladogram from Pusch et al. (2023) showing one hypothesis of cynodont relationships:

- Cynodontia
  - Charassognathidae
  - - Dvinia prima
    - - Procynosuchus delaharpeae
      - Epicynodontia
        - Nythosaurus larvatus
        - - - Galesaurus planiceps
            - Progalesaurus lootsbergensis
          - - - Cynosaurus suppostus
              - Vetusodon elikhulu
            - - Thrinaxodon liorhinus
              - - Nanictosaurus kitchingi
                - Platycraniellus elegans
              - - Bolotridon frerensis
                - Eucynodontia
