= Platycraniellus =

Platycraniellus Temporal range: Early Triassic ~252–247 Ma

Scientific classification
- Kingdom: Animalia
- Phylum: Chordata
- Clade: Synapsida
- Clade: Therapsida
- Clade: Cynodontia
- Clade: Epicynodontia
- Genus: †Platycraniellus van Hoepen, 1917
- Species: †P. elegans

Binomial name
- †Platycraniellus elegans van Hoepen, 1917

Synonyms
- Platycranion, Platycranion elegans

Extinct genus of cynodonts from the early Triassic of South Africa

Platycraniellus is an extinct genus of carnivorous cynodonts from the Early Triassic. It is known from the Lystrosaurus Assemblage Zone of the Normandien Formation in South Africa. P. elegans is the only species in this genus based on the holotype specimen from the Ditsong National Museum of Natural History in Pretoria, South Africa (formerly known as the Transvaal Museum). Due to limited fossil records for study, Platycraniellus has only been briefly described a handful of times.

Platycraniellus has been recognized as basal cynodonts, characterized by the broad temporal region of the skull and a short snout. Based on its phylogenetic position, Platycraniellus has a variety of morphologies similar to the sister taxon of Thrinaxodon, a relatively well-studied taxon.

== History of discovery ==
Platycraniellus elegans was discovered in the Lystrosaurus Assemblage Zone in the Free State Province of South Africa. The holotype (TM25) was first described by van Hoepen in 1916 and originally named Platycranion elegans, but this was potentially a printing error in the first publication. The following year, van Hoepen renamed the specimens Platycraniellus elegans.

Originally, Platycraniellus elegans was classified as a member of the Galesauridae, a family which contained species with both incomplete and complete osseous secondary palates, by Hoposon, Kitching, and Brink. Later, this feature was used to classify the taxon into two families: Galesauridae and Thrinaxodontidae. Galesauridae is the name given to a taxon with incomplete secondary palates, whereas Thrinaxodontidae is the name given to a taxon with complete secondary palates. Platycraniellus elegans is now considered to be Thrinaxodontidae. A larger specimen (NMQR 860) was originally referred to as Platycraniellus elegans by Brink, however recent studies have considered this specimen to be Galesaurus planiceps by Hopson and Kitching as well as Abdala. Therefore, the holotype specimen is the only fossil record of Platycraniellus at this moment.

== Description ==
=== Skull ===
The holotype specimen is generally in great condition; however, there are some significant damages caused by immature preparation techniques back then. In the dorsal view, the skull is broad in shape with a wide temporal region and two large lateral temporal fenestrae relative to the orbits. A short snout is one of the main characteristics of this group. The premaxilla has an anterior premaxillary foramen and a developed ascending process, which is damaged dorsally. The narrow septomaxilla is present in the nasal region but less developed in other species such as Thrinaxodon. The maxilla region contains a series of nutritive foramina and an infraorbital foramen with an anterior and ventral orientation. The nasal bone is wider where it contacts the lacrimal and prefrontal bones. The orbits face forward and outward. The parietal foramen extends back along the parietal bar and is at the center of the sagittal crest. The robust zygomatic arch is the main reason why the skull is so wide. Similar to Thrinaxodon, Progalesaurus, and Chiniquodon, the squamosal in the zygomatic portion extends anteriorly to the base of the postorbital bar. The jugal extends back along the zygomatic arch.

In ventral view, Platycraniellus has a complete osseous secondary palate similar to Thrinaxodon. The palate extends to the penultimate postcanine with the same length as the snout and shows a remarkably broad and short palatal process of the palatine at the posterior margin. A huge incisive foramen is present and reaches the posterior margin of the upper canine. At the base of the pterygoid process, the tiny quadrangular ectopterygoid is present. The quadrate is slightly convex anteriorly and contacts with the quadrate ramus of the pterygoid, which reaches posteriorly under the epipterygoid. This feature also appears in other basal cynodonts, such as Thrinaxodon and Galesaurids. The quadrate lateral condyle is less developed than the medial condyle in this group. Other similarities of skull morphology with Thrinaxodon are the development of the quadrate and the quadratojugal. The epipterygoid is greatly enlarged anteroposteriorly. Well-developed interorbital vacuity and a large trigeminal foramen are present. The frontal is distinguished dorsally and lacks contact with palatine. The transverse fronto-nasal suture on the roof of the skull is one of the primitive skull morphologies presented in this group. A deeply concave occipital plate is present and overhung by the occipital ridges.

The coronoid process in the dentary is highly mature. The overall angle of the dentary is slightly prominent, but the lateral crest on the right side is low. While the angular in lateral view is well-developed as well as concave laterally. The right reflected lamina has a sturdy strong base preserved in the holotype specimen.

=== Dentition ===
Unfortunately, almost all dentition in the holotype was damaged by grinding. Based on the roots of upper dentition, there appear to have four incisors, one canine, and roughly six or seven postcanines. Eight teeth are present in the dentary. Only a few crowns are preserved, which are four upper right postcanines and one lower postcanine. Compared to the postcanines, the smooth canine exhibits some faint longitudinal striations and is relatively large. Having simple first and second postcanine with other groups, such as the Progalesaurus and Galesaurus, Platycraniellus’s dentition exhibits a prominent curved tip with a convex front edge and a solitary cusp at the back.

=== Postcranial ===
Apart from the skull, a small portion of the humerus is preserved and attached to the skull, which is the diaphysis and bottom part of the bone. Therefore, only the dorsal view of the element can be described. The deltopectoral crest is clearly defined and perpendicular to the long axis of the bone. The bottom part of the bone is notably wide, with a laterally expanded entepicondyle and a trochlea that create a triangular groove. Visible striations and scars infer the muscle attachment points on both epicondyles. A large entepicondylar foramen can be observed in this specimen.

== Classification ==
Platycraniellus is the sister group of Eucynodontia and belongs to the Epicynodontia clade, which is a subdivision of the larger Cynodontia clade. Thrinaxodon is placed as the successive outgroup of these two groups. Notably, the Cynodontia clade, which Platycraniellus is a member of, was crucial in the evolution of all mammals, including Morganucodon. Cynodontia is considered the third radiation of synapsids and includes mammals as its living member.

- Cynodontia
  - - Procynosuchus
    - Dvinia
  - Epicynodontia
    - Cynosaurus
    - - Galesaurus
      - Progalesaurus
    - - Thrinaxodon
      - - Platycraniellus
        - Eucynodontia
          - Cynognathia
          - Probainognathia

== Paleobiology ==
=== Lifestyle ===
The masseteric fossa on the dentary preserved in Platycraniellus represents higher bite force since this feature allows more masseteric muscle attaches to the lower jaw and provides greater strength for biting, chewing, or crushing. This feature also allows more efficient and powerful jaw movements. Together with the multi-cusps dentition, Platycraniellus is suggested to be a carnivore, a predominantly meat-eating animal similar to Thrinaxodon.

=== Metabolism ===
The complete osseous secondary palate which divides the nasal cavity from the rest of the mouth would have given Platycraniellus the ability to breathe while processing food at the same time. This feature allows Platycraniellus to maximize their time for processing food, reduce digestion time, and eventually gain more energy for mobile activity. Therefore, Platycraniellus is suggested to have a highly mobile lifestyle which required an active metabolic rate.

Based on the phylogeny and the close relationship with Thrinaxodon, Platycraniellus potentially contains a diaphragm due to the separation of dorsal vertebrae into thoracic and lumbar regions seen in Thrinaxodon. The diaphragm would allow Platycraniellus to overcome Carrier's constraint, whereby reptiles can’t breathe while running. This adaptation could support high-speed movements which required a high metabolic rate as well. Therefore, considering both cranial and postcranial morphologies, Platycraniellus probably is an endotherm.

== Paleoenvironment ==
The Lystrosaurus Assemblage Zone is named after the abundance of L. declivis and L. murrayi fossil records, two relatively small-sized dicynodonts, including the Palingkloof member of the Upper portion of the Balfour Formation. This biozone is a significant biozone that contains evidence of the survival and recovery from the end-Permian mass extinction (EPME) and marks the Permian-Triassic boundary with the Daptocephalus Assemblage Zone underneath.

This boundary is determined by a change in the sedimentary rock types, indicating a shift in the fluvial environment. The Daptocephalus Assemblage Zone has meandering, high-sinuosity river channels made up of greenish-gray siltstones and mudstones. While the Palingkloof Member shows meandering river channels in reddish-brown and maroon-colored rocks, indicating arid and warm conditions. The overlying Katberg Formation has braided, low-sinuosity river channels composed of coarse-grained sandstones interspersed with reddish-brown siltstones and mudstones. The dominance of sandstones in the Lystrosaurus Assemblage Zone suggests a more arid climate with shallow, braided rivers that seasonally dried up and frequently flooded their banks, resulting in the presence of crevasse-splays.

There is also evidence of erosion and die-offs of plant ecosystems, indicated by conglomerates and a gap in coal deposits. Mudstone and siltstone outcrops are less common, mainly found in the lower sections of the Palingkloof Member and in the uppermost section of the Burgersdorp Formation, and nodule conglomerates comprising pedogenic nodules and intrabasinal clasts are also present.

== Paleoecology ==
The Lystrosaurus Assemblage Zone contains a variety of vertebrates, ranging from amphibians, archosauromorphs, therocephalians, eosuchians, to cynodonts. Based on the abundance of fossil records in each group, the calculation appeals to an irregular ratio between herbivores and carnivores. As the general trend infers an overall increase in the abundance of prey relative to the predators from Eodicynodon to Lystrosaurus Assemblage Zone. This disequilibrium is thought to be an environmental response to the temperature increase.

== See also ==
- List of therapsids
