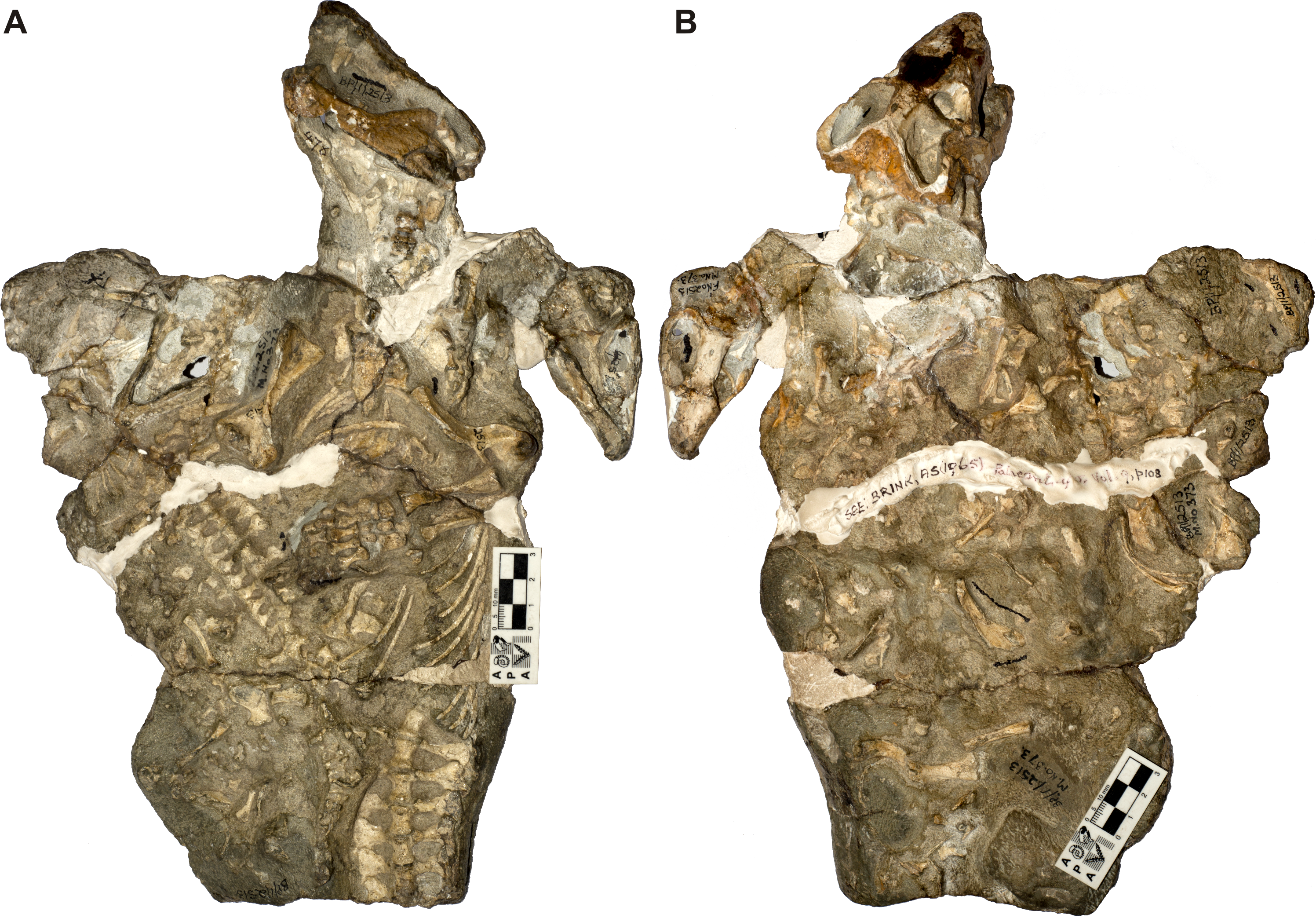
- Specimen in a block

Scientific classification
- Kingdom: Animalia
- Phylum: Chordata
- Clade: Synapsida
- Clade: Therapsida
- Clade: Cynodontia
- Family: †Galesauridae
- Genus: †Galesaurus; Owen, 1859

Type species
- Galesaurus planiceps Owen, 1859

= Galesaurus =

Galesaurus Temporal range: Induan-Olenekian ~252–247 Ma

Extinct genus of cynodonts from the Triassic of South Africa

Galesaurus (from the Greek roots for 'weasel' and 'lizard') is an extinct genus of carnivorous cynodont therapsid that lived between the Induan and the Olenekian stages of the Early Triassic in what is now South Africa. It was incorrectly classified as a dinosaur by Sir Richard Owen in 1859.

Notably, Galesaurus was mentioned in the first issue of Nature in 1869, where T. H. Huxley erroneously expressed confidence that it would eventually be shown to be a dinosaur.

== Description ==
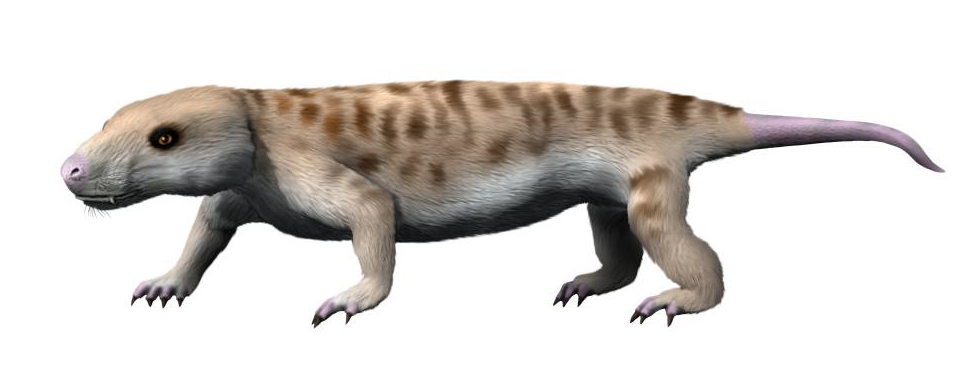
Restoration of Galesaurus planiceps

The largest Galesaurus skull discovered is roughly 12 centimetres (4.7 in) long. Larger remains indicate that an adult Galesaurus is roughly 75 to 80 centimetres (30 to 31 in) long. Cynodonts, including Galesaurus, are believed to have had sprawling postures.

Examination of Galesaurus reveals two distinct morphs, a gracile and a robust morph. The main differences between the two morphs lie in the pectoral and pelvic girdles, as well as subtle differences in the fore and hind limbs. The morphological differences may be due to sexual dimorphism, ontogeny, or the presence of two subspecies.

=== Skull ===
The skull of Galesaurus is generally wide and low, the widest part being the region of the zygomatic arches. The snout is blunt.

The nasal bones of Galesaurus are unusually large, they are constricted in the middle and extend over the anterior of the nostrils. A sheet of bone forms the septomaxilla that lines the floor of the naris and extends backwards between the nasal and maxilla. The skull has a septomaxillary foramen. The maxilla makes up a significant section of the lateral wall of the snout and contacts the lacrimal and jugal posteriorly. Formina perforates the maxilla, especially in the area of the canine. Two large foramina, above the fifth and sixth postcanines, are present. The ascending process of the premaxilla dorsally overlaps the nasal. The anterior of the ascending process has a small opening call the anterior premaxillary foramen.

Galesaurus has large, pentagonal shaped lacrimals with a flat outer surface. A fossa is present medial to the crista lacrimalis. This fossa is connected by two canals, one above the other, to the lacrimonasal canal that opens into the nasal cavity. The prefrontals extend halfway along the border of the lacrimals until they meet the postorbitals at the middle of the upper border of the orbits, forming the upper orbital margin. As in other cynodonts, the frontal is excluded from the orbital margin by the prefrontal and postorbital.

=== Dentition ===
The teeth of Galesaurus were attached to the jaws via gomphoses. The upper teeth of Galesaurus are located on the alveolar ridges of the premaxilla and maxilla. Palatal teeth are absent in Galesaurus. The first postcanine of Galesaurus only has one cusp, while the other postcanine teeth are flattened and have two curved cusps. The second tooth contains a long anterior cusp and a short posterior cusp. The base of the incisors is wide, though the crown tapers to a point. The canines and postcanines have been pushed to the outer rim of the maxilla, allowing the lower teeth enough room to lie medially to the upper teeth when the jaw is closed. Postcanine tooth replacement is believed to have occurred throughout life. In the anterior dentition, meanwhile, incisors were also continuously replaced throughout life; canine replacement, however, ceased upon the onset of skeletal maturity.

The maxilla forms a large portion of the lateral wall of the snout. It is composed of a corpus, frontal process, zygomatic process, palatal process, and alveolar process. The corpus is long, inconspicuous, and encloses the sinus maxillaris cavity. The sinus maxillaris opens into the nasal cavity dorsal to the secondary palate and anterior to the palatine. It extends anteriorly, and continues to narrow until the cavity ends below the posterior elongation of the roots of the canine. This cavity is hypothesized to have served as the cynodont equivalent to the mammalian canalis alveolaris. There are two large foramina in the maxilla, above the fifth and sixth postcanines.

== Discovery and naming ==
The first Galesaurus specimen was originally discovered in the Karoo Basin of South Africa and described by the naturalist Sir Richard Owen in 1859. Owen named the specimen Galesaurus planiceps, but incorrectly classified Galesaurus as a new species of dinosaur. Owen assumed that Galesaurus was reptilian because its skull resembled Rhopalodon, a synapsid that had also been misclassified as a dinosaur. Despite classifying Galesaurus as a dinosaur, Owen noted that Galesaurus was remarkably mammal-like. Owen's Galesaurus type specimen was considerably crushed and the teeth were poorly preserved. Only recently have articulated skeletons of Galesaurus been found, whose well-preserved postcranial bones yield a better understanding of Galesaurus morphology; it is now considered to be a cynodont.

Other Galesaurus planiceps fossils that were initially identified as Glochinodon detinens in 1916 and Glochinodontoides gracilis in 1924 were synonymized subjectively with Galesaurus planiceps in 1972.

== Classification ==
Galesaurus is a member of the clade Epicynodontia, which is within the infraorder Cynodontia, the ancestor group of all mammals. Galesaurus is also a member of the family Galesauridae, which includes the closest relatives of Galesaurus, Cynosaurus and Progalesaurus.

- Theriodontia
  - Gorgonopsidae
  - Eutheriodontia
    - Lycosuchus
    - Cynodontia
      - Dvinia
      - - Procynosuchus
        - Epicynodontia
          - Galesauridae
            - Cynosaurus
            - - Progalesaurus
              - Galesaurus
          - Bolotridon
          - - Platycraniellus
            - Thrinaxodon
            - Eucynodontia
              - Lumkuia
              - Trirachodon

== Paleobiology ==
=== Locomotion ===
During cynodont locomotion, the axial skeleton is unlikely to have flexed and extended in the sagittal plane as it does in mammals. Instead, cynodonts are believed to have moved by lateral undulation, the typical axial movement of reptiles. The imbricating coastal plates in cynodonts may be analogous to the expanded ribs in certain edentates, which may represent musculoskeletal adaptation to adopt a more characteristically mammalian posture by lifting the trunk off the ground. Cynodonts are also believed to have had propulsive movements in the humerus, which are typical in mammal locomotion. The presence of both reptile and mammal features in cynodont locomotion is indicative of a transition between the two classes.

=== Comparison of Galesaurus to Thrinaxodon ===
Galesaurus is often compared with Thrinaxodon, a more derived basal cynodont, because Thrinaxodon is the best known of all the Epicynodonts. Galesaurus and Thrinaxodon are also very similar in morphology, are both from the early Triassic, and are both found in the Karoo Basin in South Africa. Though Galesaurus and Thrinaxodon are similar in appearance, they have a number of differences in their skulls. In Galesaurus, the zygomatic arch height has positive allometry, which indicates that older individuals of Galesaurus had larger and more developed masseter muscles than in Thrinaxodon. The development of the angulation of the zygomatic arch in the adult Galesaurus indicates that the superficial masseter muscle also became more developed in comparison to Thrinaxodon. Timing of the development of the posterior sagittal crest occurs later in Galesaurus than it does in Thrinaxodon. The posterior sagittal crest develops in Thrinaxodon in the late juvenile stage, while it only appears in the adult stage of Galesaurus. While all adult Thrinaxodon develop an anterior sagittal crest, the structure is absent in most Galesaurus specimens. The absence of the anterior sagittal crest indicates that the anterior fibers of the temporalis muscle not as developed in Galesaurus as they were in Thrinaxodon. Skull width, which indicates lateral expansion of the zygomatic arches, varies between Galesaurus and Thrinaxodon. Galesaurus has a positively allometric skull width, while skull width in isometric in Thrinaxodon. This indicates that Galesaurus had a more developed adductor musculature. When taking the differences in adductor musculature and the large medial shift of the mandible within the temporal fenestra, it is hypothesized that Galesaurus had highly developed masseters. The external occipital crest of Galesaurus increased during growth, though it was absent in juvenile Thrinaxodon, and poorly developed in the adults. The size of the external occipital crest indicates enlarged, stronger nuchal muscles in Galesaurus, but relatively weaker nuchal muscles in Thrinaxodon. Galesaurus also had a larger maximum skull size than Thrinaxodon. The presence of comparatively thicker peripheral lamellar tissue in Thrinaxodon and excelerated ontogenetic development of the posterior sagittal crest suggests that Galesaurus reached sexual maturity later than Thrinaxodon.

During ontogeny, both Galesaurus and Thrinaxodon undergo changes in posterior projection of the postorbital, posterior sagittal crest, and external occipital crest. Ontogenetic changes that were unique to Galesaurus include a large shift in the relative position of the mandible within the temporal fenestra, a change in the ectocranial morphology of the nasal-nasal suture, fusion of the exocciptal with three surrounding occipital bones, and development of sexual dimorphism in adults. In contrast, the ontogenetic changes that were unique to Galesaurus include the presence of an interpterygoid vacuity in small juveniles, change in the ectocranial trace of the frontal-parietal suture, the changing shape of the parietal foramen, and obliteration of the posterior parietal-parietal suture.

== See also ==
- List of therapsids
