= Normandien Formation =

Triassic geological formation in South Africa

- Stratigraphic range: Induan
- Type: Geological formation
- Unit of: Lystrosaurus Assemblage Zone; Beaufort Group
- Sub-units: Harrismith Member

Lithology
- Primary: Sandstone

Location
- Coordinates: 28.6°S 29.1°E
- Approximate paleocoordinates: 66.3°S 10.8°W
- Region: Free State, KwaZulu-Natal
- Country: South Africa
- Normandien Formation (South Africa)

The Normandien Formation is a Triassic-age rock formation located in Free State, South Africa. It is where the fossils of Ericiolacerta, a subtaxa of Ericiolacertidae, were found.

== Fossil content ==
Among others, these fossils were reported from the formation:

- Aenigmasaurus grallator
- Broomistega putterilli
- Ericiolacerta parva
- Galesaurus planiceps
- Lydekkerina huxleyi
- Lystrosaurus curvatus, L. declivis, L. murrayi
- Micropholis stowi
- Moschorhinus kitchingi
- Myosaurus gracilis
- Olivierosuchus parringtoni
- Platycraniellus elegans
- Prolacerta broomi
- Prolystrosaurus strigops
- Proterosuchus fergusi
- Scaloposaurus constrictus
- Tetracynodon darti
- Thrinaxodon liorhinus

== See also ==
- List of fossiliferous stratigraphic units in South Africa
- Geology of South Africa
- Ericiolacertidae
