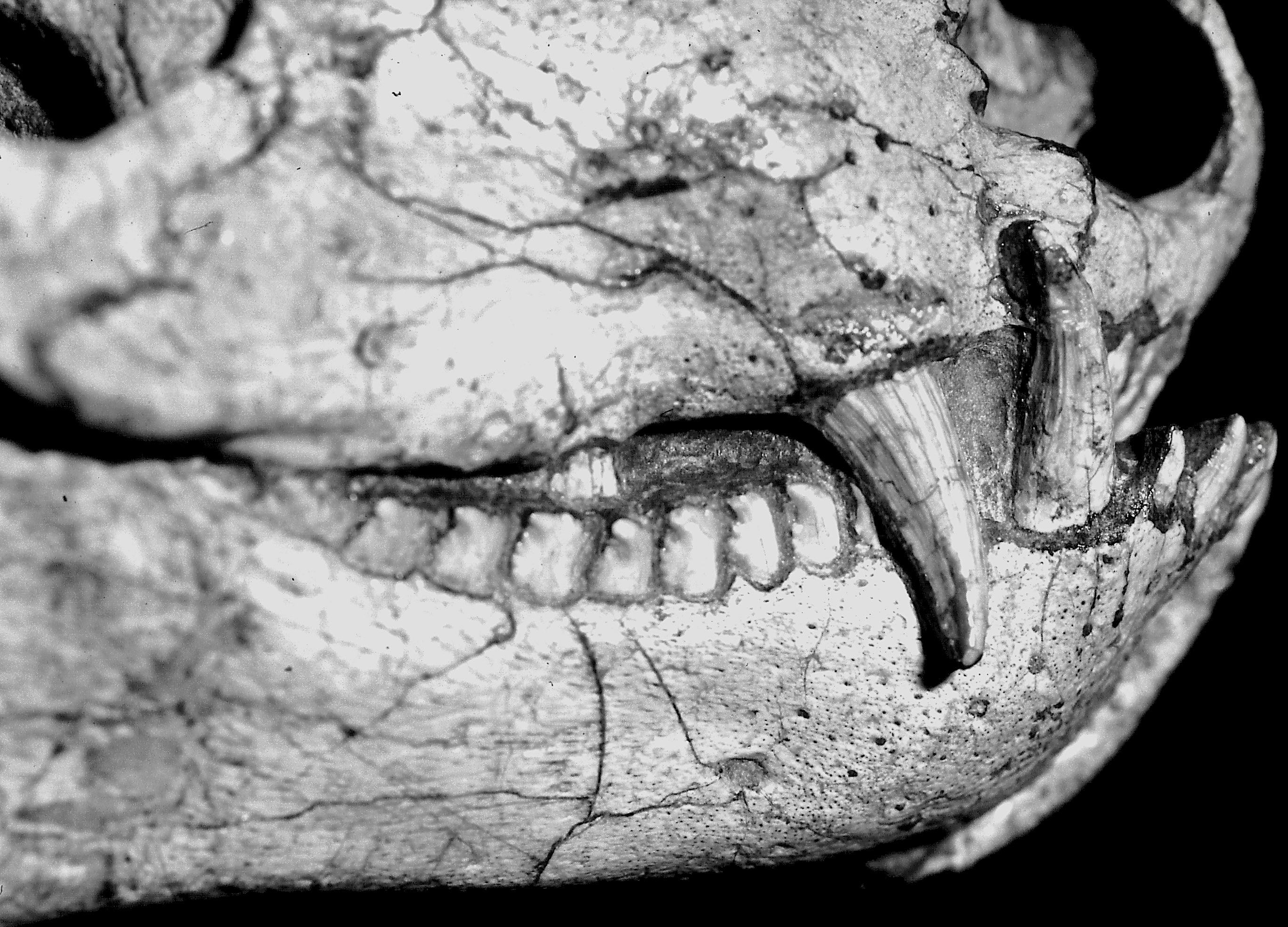
- Progalesaurus dentary in right lateral view

Scientific classification
- Kingdom: Animalia
- Phylum: Chordata
- Clade: Synapsida
- Clade: Therapsida
- Clade: Cynodontia
- Family: †Galesauridae
- Genus: †Progalesaurus; Sidor & Smith, 2004

Type species
- Progalesaurus lootsbergensis Sidor & Smith, 2004

= Progalesaurus =

Progalesaurus Temporal range: Induan ~252.17–251.2 Ma

Extinct genus of cynodonts

Progalesaurus is an extinct genus of galesaurid cynodont from the early Triassic. Progalesaurus is known from a single fossil of the species Progalesaurus lootsbergensis, found in the Lystrosaurus Assemblage Zone of the Balfour Formation. Close relatives of Progalesaurus, other galesaurids include Galesaurus and Cynosaurus. Galesaurids appeared just before the Permian–Triassic extinction event, and disappeared from the fossil record in the middle Triassic.

The name "Progalesaurus" is derived from Greek: "pro" meaning before, "gale" meaning weasel or cat, and "saurus" meaning lizard or reptile. The name refers to the relationship Progalesaurus has to the more derived Galesaurus.

== Discovery and history ==
Progalesaurus was originally discovered by Roger M. H. Smith in 1998. The specimen was found in the Sneeuberg mountains near New Lootsberg Pass in the Karoo Basin of South Africa. Progalesaurus was first described in 2004 by Christian A. Sidor and Roger M. H. Smith in their paper titled, "A New Galesaurid (Therapsida: Cynodontia) From the Lower Triassic of South Africa".

Although no other specimen of Progalesaurus has been found, Sidor and Smith's findings have been included in many papers on the Permian–Triassic extinction event, cynodont diversity and the paleoenvironment of South Africa.

== Description ==
Progalesaurus was a relatively small mammal-like creature, with the skull of its holotype measuring 9.35 cm in length. It likely closely resembled its early cynodont relatives: quadrupedal and covered in fur.

=== Skull ===
Progalesaurus, like Galesaurus, has remarkably large nares compared to other early cynodonts. The nares are formed externally by the premaxilla, the maxilla and the nasal. The septomaxilla resides inside the nares, on top of the junction between maxilla and premaxilla.

The orbit faces anteriorly and is formed by the lacrimal, prefrontal, jugal and post orbital. The post orbital notably has a deeply forked posterior margin. This characteristic is seen in some other basal cynodonts, but is widely variable.

The maxilla forms a large portion of the side of the face and is dotted with small foramina, mostly above the canines. These foramina likely housed nerves, and were perhaps associated with whiskers. The nasal is also dotted with tiny foramina.

Progalesaurus has a parietal foramen, which is used for light sensing in similar extant taxa. Posterior to the parietal foramen the parietals are fused, forming a sagittal crest. The crest narrows posterior to the foramen like Galesaurus and Cynosaurus, and unlike more derived cynodonts.

Progalesaurus, like Galesaurus, Cynosaurus and Thrinaxodon, possesses a large zygomatic arch. Under this arch, in posterior view, lies a foramen associated with the outer ear tube. Compared to cynognathians such as Cynognathus or Diademodon, the foramen is relatively shallow.

Progalesaurus does not have a fully formed secondary palate, which serves to separate the airway from food-processing.

=== Dentition ===
The mandible of Progalesaurus is very similar to that of Galesaurus, with its teeth setting it apart from other cynodonts. Progalesaurus has a dental formula of I4/3, C1/1, PC7?/9. The upper incisors are long and thin, with a circular cross-section. The lower incisors are shorter than their upper counterparts. The incisors have an oval cross-section and longitudinal striations. The upper canine's edges are preserved well enough to conclude they lack serration, but the lower canines are not still sharp enough to make any conclusions about their serration. The lower canines are slightly longer than the upper canines.

The post-canine teeth are currently the most distinctive feature of Progalesaurus. The recurved main cusp resembles Galesaurus, Cynosaurus and Probelesodon; however, the number and placement of the accessory cusps are unique. The upper post-canines are poorly preserved, but the teeth that are well-enough preserved to note accessory cusps have at least one posterior to the main recurved cusp each. The bottom post-canines are extremely well preserved. The teeth become progressively lower and anteroposteriorly longer from front to back. The buccal surface of each post-canine is smooth. The teeth are also slightly angled so that the posterior of one tooth contacts the anterior of the next. The posterior accessory cusps of teeth 2 and 3 curve upwards towards the top of the tooth. The fourth tooth shows posterior accessory cusps as well as at least one cusp mesial to the main cusp. The fifth tooth only shows one posterior accessory cusp, but the lack of other accessory cusps is "probably due to wear". The sixth tooth on to the 9th tooth have multiple posterior accessory cusps as well as at least one mesial cusp.

=== Post-cranial skeleton ===
Very little post-cranial skeleton is preserved in the holotype for Progalesaurus. Only the right scapula and the left atlantal neural spine were recovered. Each of these elements closely resemble those of Thrinaxodon.

== Classification ==
Progalesaurus is a galesaurid, belonging to the clade Epicynodontia. As an epicynodont, Progalesaurus belongs to the greater clade Cynodontia. Cynodonts are therapsids, which in turn belong to the greater group Synapsida, and the even broader Amniota.

- Cynodontia
  - - Dvinia
    - Procynosuchus
  - Epicynodontia
    - Cynosaurus
    - - Galesaurus
      - Progalesaurus
    - - Thrinaxodon
      - - Platycraniellus
        - Eucynodontia
          - Cynognathia
          - Probainognathia

== Paleobiology ==
Early cynodonts like Progalesaurus likely had large litters, as more derived cynodonts like Tritylodontid have been found with litters far larger than modern mammals. Early cynodonts have also been preserved with juveniles, suggesting they provided parental care to their young.

Progalesaurus likely burrowed, as closely related taxa like Thrinaxodon and Galesaurus have been found in burrows of their own making. Burrowing likely helped Triassic cynodonts to avoid harsh above-ground conditions shortly after the Permian-Triassic extinction event. Early cynodonts have even been found in burrows with other taxa, indicating they may have cohabitated interspecifically.

Paleontologists believe that early cynodonts like Progalesaurus were insectivores and carnivores. Tooth shape, in addition to coprolites, are used to investigate diet. One coprolite of a 240-million-year-old cynodont preserved parasitic nematode eggs, the earliest evidence of pinworms ever found.

== Paleoenvironment ==
Progalesaurus lived very soon after the Permian–Triassic extinction event in what is modern South Africa. Other cynodonts and potentially even other galesaurids, like Cynosaurus, crossed the extinction boundary. Cynodonts may have been able to survive the mass extinction due to their burrowing behavior, as living mostly underground could have pre-conditioned these burrowers to the high levels of carbon dioxide and low levels of oxygen present during the extinction event. Cynodont diversity increased relatively rapidly after the extinction event.

The early Triassic period was one of the hottest in the history of the Earth; however, the climate in the areas cynodonts have been discovered was more temperate. There were high levels of carbon dioxide in the atmosphere. In the Karoo Basin, where Progalesaurus was discovered, there is evidence to suggest the area was a moderately damp open woodland.

In the early Triassic of South Africa, Progalesaurus was accompanied by "survivor fauna" and "recovery fauna". A few examples of (vertebrate) survivor fauna, creatures that crossed the extinction boundary, include Lystrosaurus, Tetracynodon, Moschorhinus and Ictidosuchoides. Recovery fauna include small amphibians such as Micropholis, Galesaurids, some procolophonoids, and some archosauromorphs such as Proterosuchus.

== See also ==
- List of therapsids
