= Nythosaurus =

Nythosaurus Temporal range: Olenekian

Scientific classification
- Kingdom: Animalia
- Phylum: Chordata
- Clade: Synapsida
- Clade: Therapsida
- Clade: Cynodontia
- Genus: †Nythosaurus
- Species: †N. larvatus

Binomial name
- †Nythosaurus larvatus Owen, 1876

Extinct genus of non-mammalian cynodont

Nythosaurus is an extinct genus of non-mammalian cynodont that lived in what is now Africa during the Olenekian stage of the Early Triassic epoch.

== Taxonomy ==
Nythosaurus was for a long time considered a junior synonym of the genus Thrinaxodon because of the apparent similarity of the holotype of the type species, Nythosaurus larvatus, to Thrinaxodon. However, CT scanning has revealed significant apomorphies distinguishing the two and establishing the validity of Nythosaurus.
