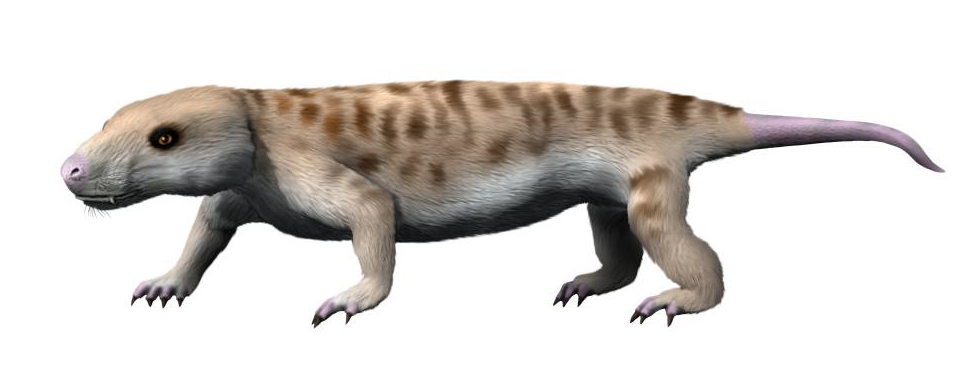
- Galesaurus plancipes

Scientific classification
- Kingdom: Animalia
- Phylum: Chordata
- Clade: Synapsida
- Clade: Therapsida
- Clade: Cynodontia
- Clade: Epicynodontia
- Family: †Galesauridae; Lyddeker, 1890

Genera
- †Cromptodon; †Cynosaurus; †Galesaurus; †Progalesaurus

= Galesauridae =

Galesaurids Temporal range: Late Permian-Middle Triassic, 259–242 Ma

Extinct family of cynodonts

Galesauridae is an extinct family of cynodonts. Along with the family Thrinaxodontidae and the extensive clade Eucynodontia (which includes mammals), it makes up the unranked taxon called Epicynodontia. Galesaurids first appeared in the very latest Permian period, just a million years (or perhaps only a thousand years) before the greatest extinction of all time, the Permian-Triassic extinction event.

Galesaurids are some of the most primitive of the Epicynodontia. They may have resembled basal cynodonts such as the Procynosuchidae, and they may have descended from a procynosuchid-like ancestor, but the galesaurids were more advanced than the basal Cynodontia. It is clear that, like many other epicynodontians, many Galesaurids had a complete secondary palate, which allowed them to swallow food while breathing, and the dentary bone was enlarged relative to those of their ancestors. Their temporal fenestrae are much larger than those of the procynosuchids, but not as large as in more advanced epicynodontians. Their snouts are broad, rather than tall, and they may have walked erect, with the legs beneath the body like most other cynodontians.

Galesaurid fossils are found almost worldwide. They were among the survivors of the Permian-Triassic extinction event, but they became extinct in the Middle Triassic epoch, as did the therocephalians. Genera of the family Galesauridae include the namesake Galesaurus.
