= Nanictosaurus =

Nanictosaurus Temporal range: Norian

Scientific classification
- Domain: Eukaryota
- Kingdom: Animalia
- Phylum: Chordata
- Clade: Synapsida
- Clade: Therapsida
- Clade: Cynodontia
- Family: †Thrinaxodontidae
- Genus: †Nanictosaurus; Broom, 1936

Type species
- † Nanictosaurus kitchingi Broom, 1936

Synonyms
- †N. robustus (Broom, 1940); †N. rubidgei (Broom, 1940)

Extinct genus of cynodont

Nanictosaurus is an extinct genus of thrinaxodontid cynodont from the Permian of what is today South Africa. Multiple species have been named, but a review of their anatomy in 1991 determined that only the type species, N. kitchingi is valid.

== See also ==
- List of therapsids
- Great Karoo
