= Lacrimal crest =

Lacrimal crest may refer to:

- Anterior lacrimal crest
- Posterior lacrimal crest
