= Cynosaurus =

Cynosaurus Temporal range: Late Permian, 259–254 Ma

Scientific classification
- Kingdom: Animalia
- Phylum: Chordata
- Clade: Synapsida
- Clade: Therapsida
- Clade: Cynodontia
- Clade: Epicynodontia
- Genus: †Cynosaurus; Schmidt, 1927

Type species
- Cynosaurus suppostus Owen, 1859

Synonyms
- Baurocynodon Brink, 1951; Cynosuchoides Broom, 1931; Cynosuchus Owen, 1876; Mygalesuchus Broom, 1942

Extinct genus of cynodonts

Cynosaurus is an extinct genus of cynodonts. Remains have been found from the Daptocephalus Assemblage Zone in South Africa. Cynosaurus was first described by Richard Owen in 1876 as Cynosuchus suppostus. Cynosaurus has been found in the late Permian period. Cyno- is derived from the Greek word kyon for dog and –sauros in Greek meaning lizard.

== History and discovery ==
Cynosaurus was first described by Richard Owen in 1876. Owen wrote and journal titled “Descriptive and illustrated catalog of the fossil reptilia of South Africa in the collection of the British Museum” in 1876. Owen named the fossil Cynosuchus suppostus Owen, 1876 which later gets renamed as Cynosaurus by K. Schmidt in 1927. Owen described Cynosuchus suppostus as similar to Cynochampsa in where the incisors and canines are located. The difference is that Cynosuchus suppostus had smaller and more upward location of nostril. The external nostril of Cynosuchus suppostus along with the forends of the upper and lower jaws were close in location with the nostril nearly horizontal. Owen described the molar teeth as relatively larger in size. Owen also noted the constriction of the upper jaw as it recedes and is combined with large molar teeth that shows Cynosuchus suppostus to have a broader and shorter skull. The nasal bones are broad and thick and overlapped by the maxillaries.

== Description ==
Derived traits for Cynosaurus are: subvertical mentum on anterior lower jaw, robust mandible with relative high horizontal ramus, broad snout up to 32% of skull length and adult Cynosaurus lacking pineal foramen. In early Cynodonts the parietal bone extends ventrally to the sidewall of the braincase. The epipterygoid is also expanded to make new contact with the frontal as well as the parietal crest is elongated to incorporate the pineal foramen.

=== Cranium ===
The septomaxilla is the flat bridge that divides the nasal into upper and lower. The nasal is broader posteriorly than anteriorly. On the surface of the maxilla there are many small nutritive foramina forming two horizontal parallel lines. For the premaxilla there is a gap along the midline between the premaxilla and the palatal processes. The vomer is unpaired and tapers and reaches a point sharp. The vomer also doesn't reach the pterygoid posteriorly. Micro-CT scans allows internal structures of fossil skulls to be observed (Benoit et al., 2017). From micro-CT scans, a pair of ossification orbitosphenoid were observed in four specimens of Cynosaurus. In orbitosphenoid consisted of two thin plate-like structures appear to articulate ventromedially and in cross section, it appears to be in an U-shape.

The rapid evolution of the masseter insertion area is able to show early diversification of early Cynodonts. In Procynosuchus and Dvinia the location of masseteric fossa high on the coronoid process is seen as an initial stage of differentiation of masseter. In Cynosaurus and Nanictosaurus the extension of masseteric fossa is to the base of the dentary.

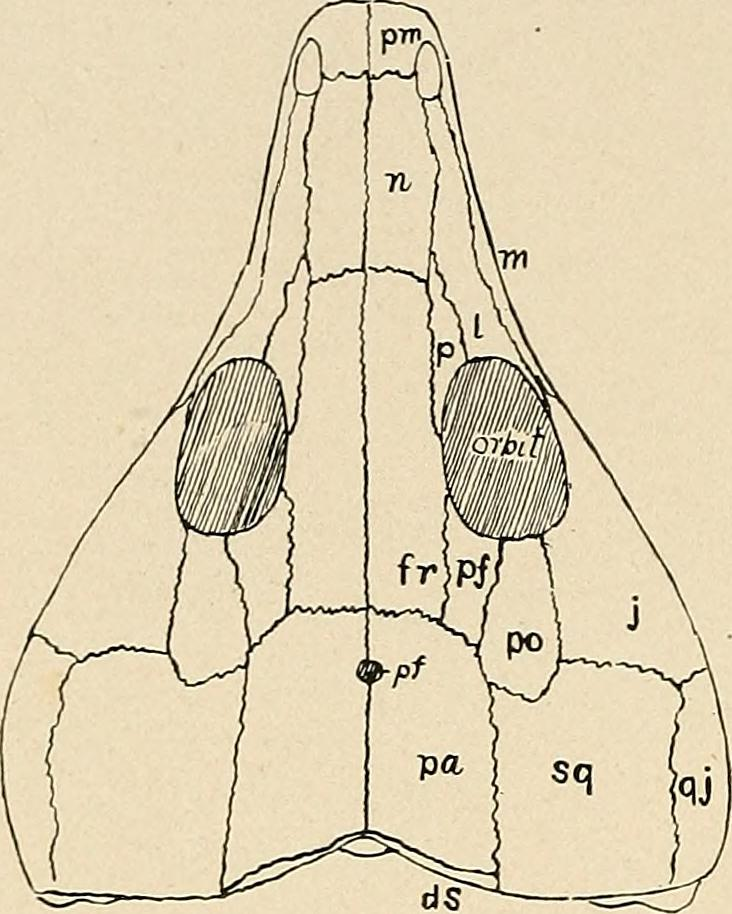
Parietal foramen (labeled pf in image) of Labidosaurus, an early reptile

=== Parietal foramen ===
On Cynosaurus there is a sharp sagittal crest that is flattened near the location of the parietal foramen. In a CT scan of a Cynosaurus skull, no parietal tube was present but instead the endocranial cavity is pushed upward. In Cynosaurus whaitsi, a specimen, was shown with the absence of parietal foramen. In another Cynosaurus skull specimen, the absence of the parietal foramen was due to an ontogenetic change as in Massetognathus the parietal foramen closes in adults. In the extant lizard Anolis carolinensis the size of the pineal opening decreases but doesn't disappear. Another specimen showed evidence of a parietal tube, but the absence wasn't due to ontogeny but from intraspecific variability.

Many lizards have a parietal eye on top of their head. In extant ectotherms living near the equator are less frequent to have a pineal opening due to the stability of the environment that makes the third eye not useful. There is a definite relationship between latitudinal distribution of lizards and parietal eye occurrence. Parietal-eyeless lizards are to low latitudes which suggests an equatorial trait.

=== Tooth ===
Cynosaurus has simple canines with an ovoid shape that lack cingulum. The post canines are posterior accessory cusp and Cynosaurus have a second posterior accessory cusp in the posterior-most teeth . The anterior accessory cusps on Cynosaurus are not visible. Most early Cynodonts show triconodont postcanines in labial view.

Procynosuchus delaharpeae and Dvinia prima are more basal to Cynosaurus and have 5 or more upper and 4 or more lower incisors while most Cynodonts have 4 upper and 3 lower incisors. Progalesaurus is also basal to Cynosaurus and they have a strong longitudinal grooves or striations on their canines. Galesaurus who are more derived than Cynosaurus have an incomplete bony second palatine processes posteriorly.

Tooth replacement in C. suppostus was characterised by a cessation of canine replacement upon reaching adulthood, similar to Galesaurus and unlike Thrinaxodon; replacement canines erupted mesially to the functional canine in the maxilla and distally to the functional canine in the mandible. Incisors were replaced in an alternating fashion. The eruption of the third maxillary postcanine coincided with the exfoliation of the last first maxillary postcanine.

== Paleoenvironment ==
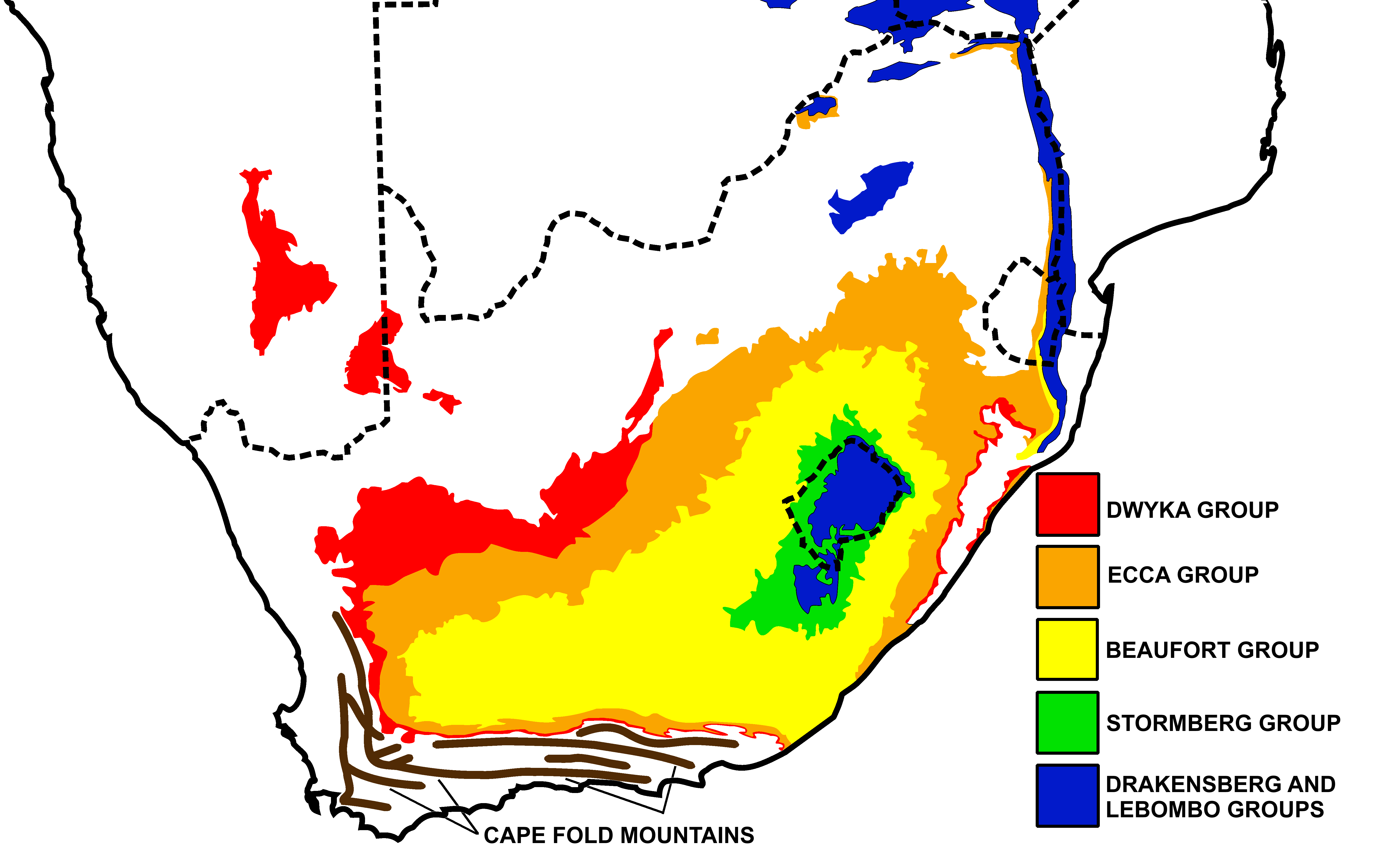
Formations in South Africa

Fossils of Cynosaurus have been found in the Cistecephalus and Daptocephalus Assemblage Zones, in the Balfour Formation of the Beaufort Group, pertaining to the Karoo Supergroup of South Africa. In the Karoo Basin of South Africa riverbanks would be over flooded creating floodplains that could hold all that water to start soil accumulation. In the lower Balfour Formation, the soil deposits suggest a lacustrine environment with abundant leaf impressions. This suggests that there was coastal marshes and swamps. There was also trace fossils found in the formation from aquatic organisms.

== See also ==
- List of therapsids
