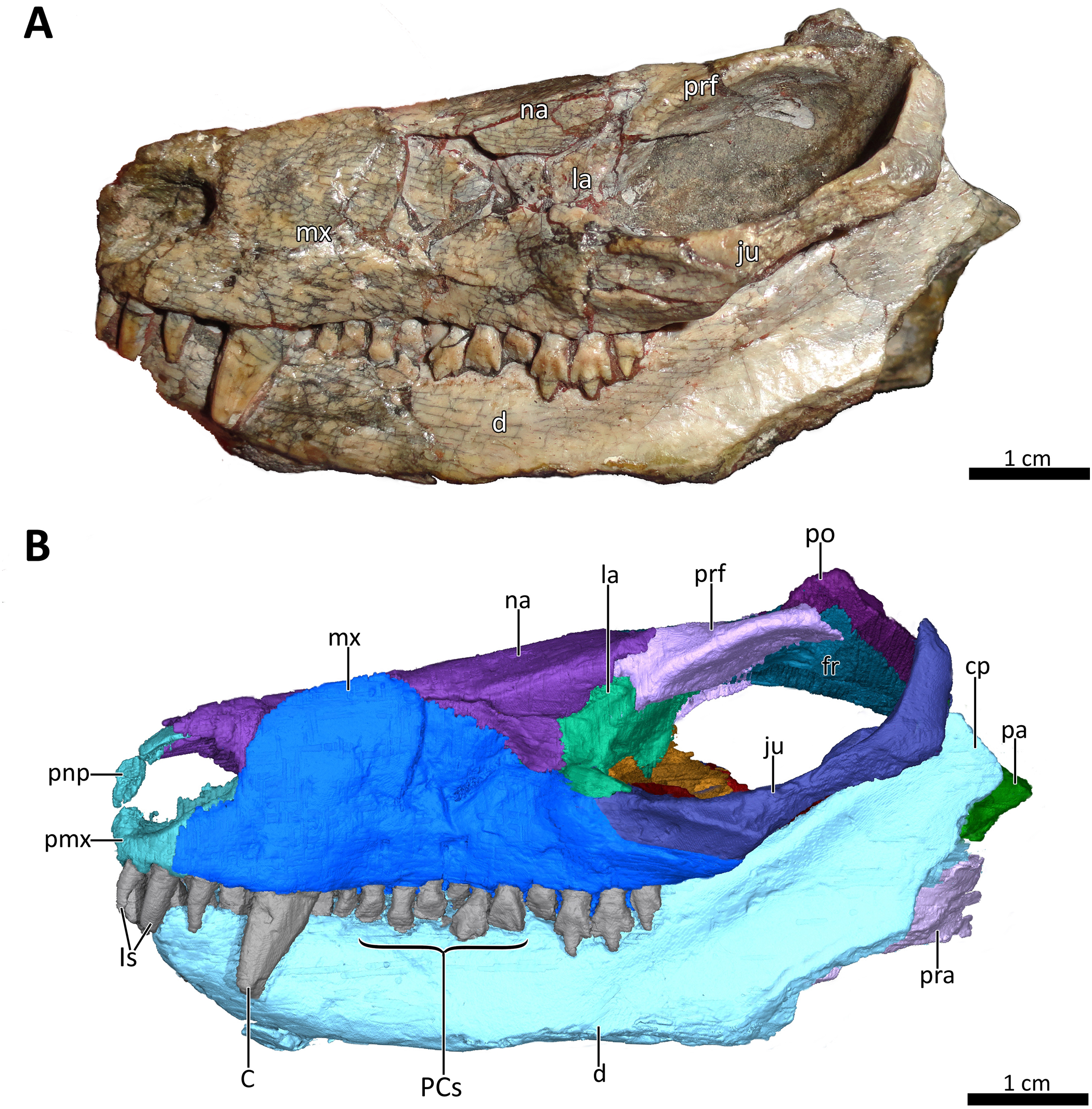
- Skull

Scientific classification
- Kingdom: Animalia
- Phylum: Chordata
- Clade: Synapsida
- Clade: Therapsida
- Clade: Cynodontia
- Clade: Epicynodontia
- Genus: Bolotridon; Coad, 1977

Synonyms
- Tribolodon Seeley, 1895 (preoccupied)

= Bolotridon =

Bolotridon Temporal range: Anisian ~247–242 Ma

Extinct genus of cynodonts

Bolotridon is an extinct genus of epicynodontian cynodont. It was renamed from its original genus designation of Tribolodon (Harry Govier Seeley, 1895), which was already occupied by a genus of cyprinid fish named in 1883 by Sauvage. The name Bolotridon was coined by Brian W. Coad in a 1977 publication as an anagram of Tribolodon.

Fossils of the genus were found in the Anisian Cynognathus Assemblage Zone of the Burgersdorp Formation of South Africa.

== Description ==
Bolotridon possessed cartilaginous respiratory turbinals, as evidenced by ridges observed in fossils of its nasal cavity.
