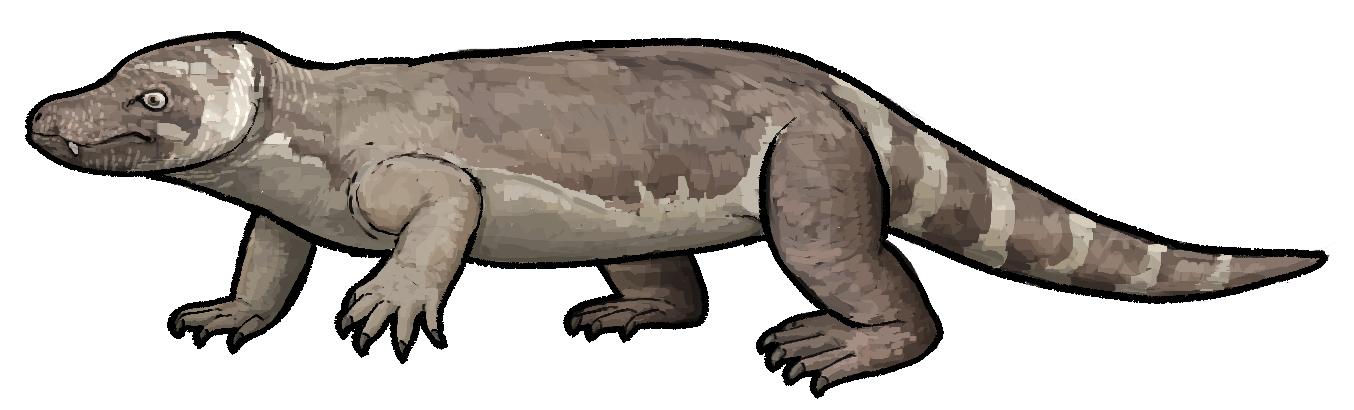
- Restoration of Dvinia prima

Scientific classification
- Kingdom: Animalia
- Phylum: Chordata
- Clade: Synapsida
- Clade: Therapsida
- Clade: Cynodontia
- Family: †Dviniidae; Tatarinov, 1968
- Genus: †Dvinia; Amalitskii, 1922
- Species: †D. prima

Binomial name
- †Dvinia prima Amalitskii, 1922

= Dvinia =

Dvinia Temporal range: Middle-Late Permian 260–252 Ma

Extinct genus of cynodonts

Dvinia is an extinct genus of cynodonts found in the Salarevo Formation of Sokolki on the Northern Dvina River near Kotlas in Arkhangelsk Oblast, Russia. It is the only known member of the family Dviniidae. Its fossil remains date from the Late Permian and were found with Inostrancevia, Scutosaurus and Vivaxosaurus.

Dvinia was a small omnivore possessing a large temporal opening typical of advanced therapsids, with a thin postorbital bar separating the eye from the muscle attachment. As a cynodont, it was closely related to mammals. The dentition consisted of a set of small incisors followed by two canines and 10-14 postcanines.

== See also ==
- List of therapsids
