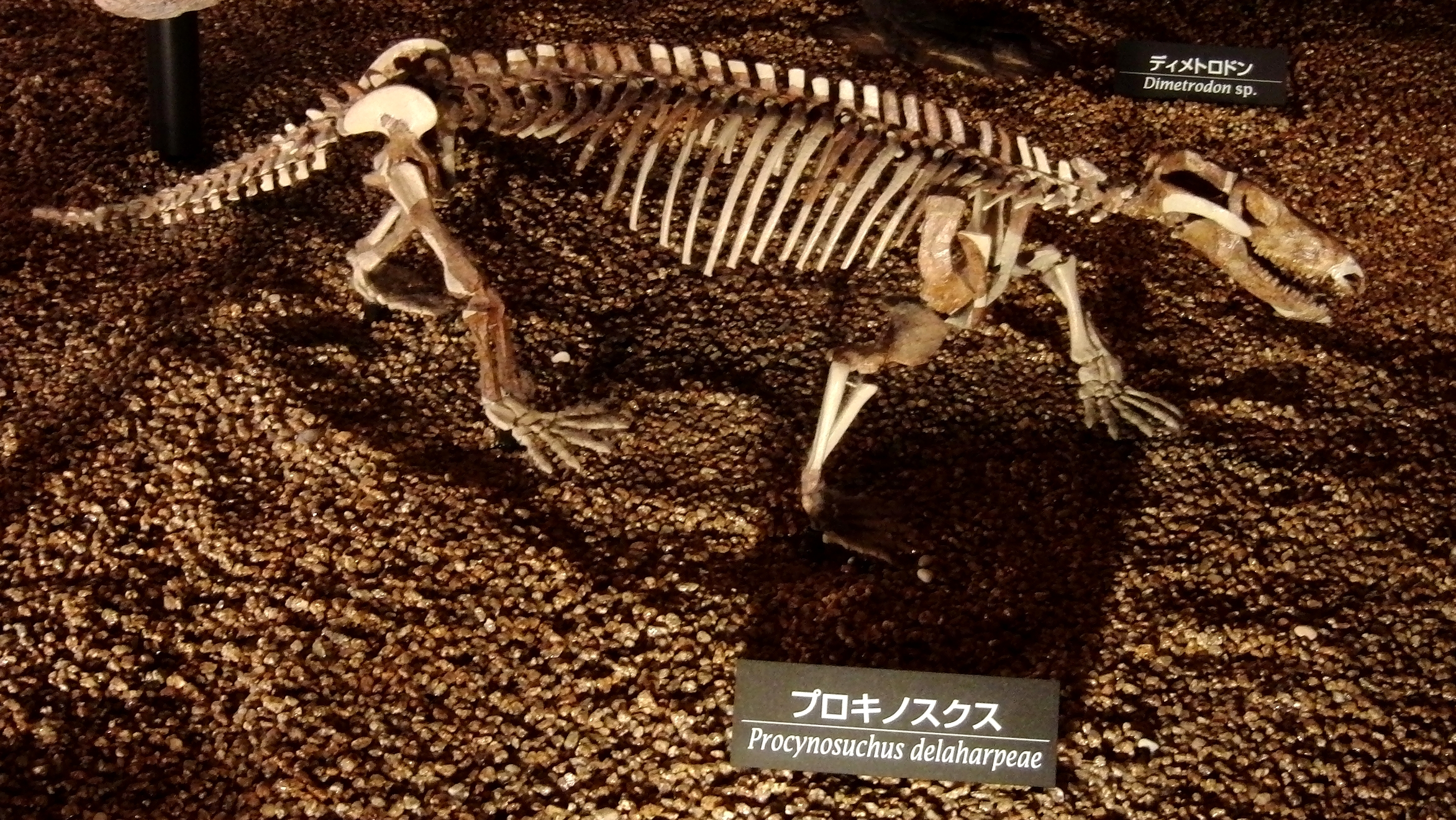
- P. delaharpeae at the National Museum of Nature and Science, Tokyo, Japan

Scientific classification
- Kingdom: Animalia
- Phylum: Chordata
- Clade: Synapsida
- Clade: Therapsida
- Clade: Cynodontia
- Family: †Procynosuchidae
- Genus: †Procynosuchus; Broom, 1937

Species
- P. delaharpeae; P. vladimirense

Synonyms
- Cyrbasiodon Broom, 1931; Parathrinaxodon Parrington, 1936

= Procynosuchus =

Procynosuchus Temporal range: Wuchiapingian,260.4–253.8 Ma

Extinct genus of cynodonts

Procynosuchus (Greek: "Before dog crocodile" or "raccoon crocodile") is an extinct genus of cynodonts from the Late Permian. It is considered to be one of the earliest and most basal cynodonts. It was 60 cm (2 ft) long.

Remains of Procynosuchus have been found in Russia, Germany, Zambia and South Africa.

== Paleobiology ==
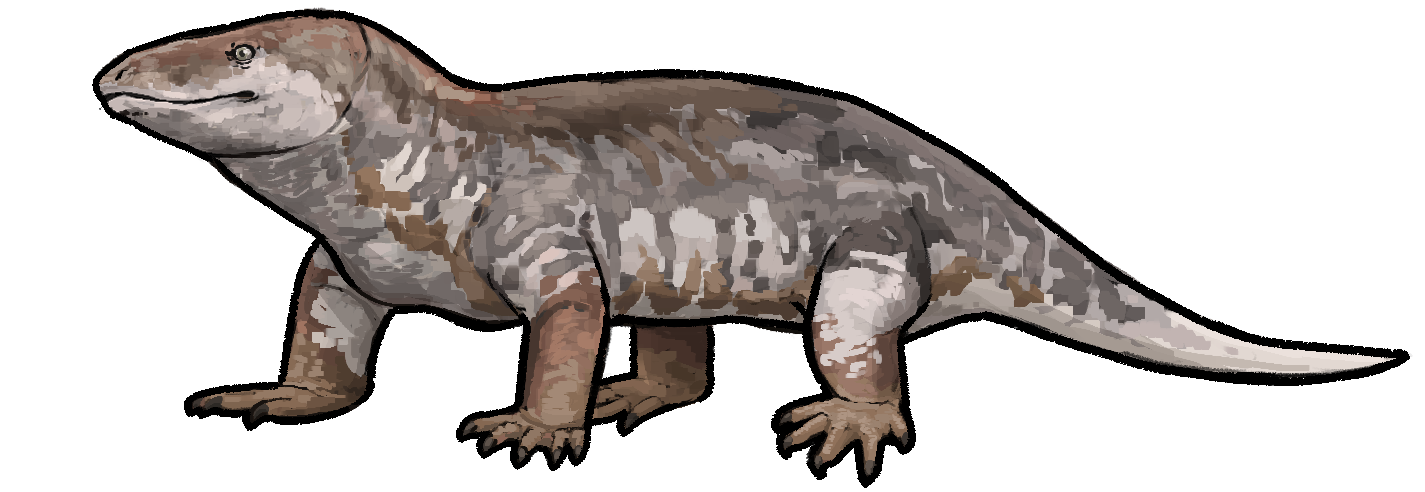
P. delaharpeae restoration

As one of the earliest cynodonts, Procynosuchus has many primitive features, but it also has features that distinguish it from all other early therapsids. Some of these features were interpreted by Kemp (1980) as adaptations for a semi-aquatic lifestyle. For example, the wide zygapophyses of the vertebrae allow for a high degree of lateral flexibility, and Procynosuchus may have used anguilliform locomotion, or eel-like undulation, to swim through the water. The tail of Procynosuchus is also unusually long for a cynodont. The long haemal arches would have given the tail a large lateral surface area for greater propulsion through the water. Relatively flat foot bones may also have been an adaptation toward swimming, as the feet may have been used like paddles. Ridges on the femur are an indication of strong flexor muscles that could have stabilized the leg during limb-driven swimming. When the thigh is pulled back in the water, the lower leg tends to bend forward. Strong flexor muscles would have pulled the lower leg back with the femur, providing the powerful backward thrust that is needed to swim.

== Discovery ==
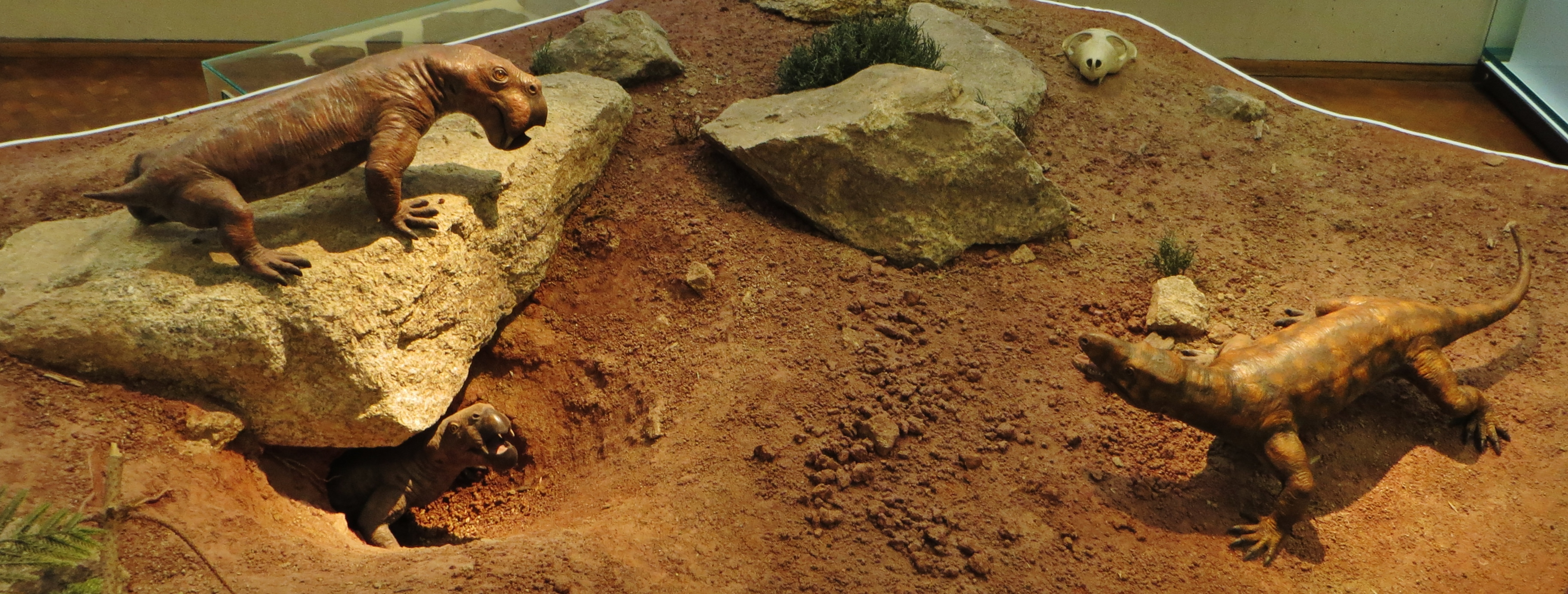
Model (right)

Procynosuchus was named by South African paleontologist Robert Broom in 1937. Broom also named the cynodont Cyrbasiodon in 1931. Another genus, Parathrinaxodon, was named by Parrington in 1936. These genera are now regarded as synonyms of Procynosuchus, as they represent the same animal. Under the International Code of Zoological Nomenclature (ICZN), these two names take precedence over Procynosuchus because they were erected earlier. The names Cyrbasiodon and Parathrinaxodon were rarely used after their erection, while the name Procynosuchus has since become widespread in scientific literature. In a case brought to the ICZN in 2009, some scientists proposed that Procynosuchus should be a nomen conservandum, or conserved name, making Cyrbasiodon and Parathrinaxodon nomina rejecta, or rejected names. In 2010, the ICZN formally made Procynosuchus a nomen conservandum.
