= Kotel'nich Tetrapod Assemblage =

Permian biozone in Russia

- Stratigraphic range: Late Capitanian
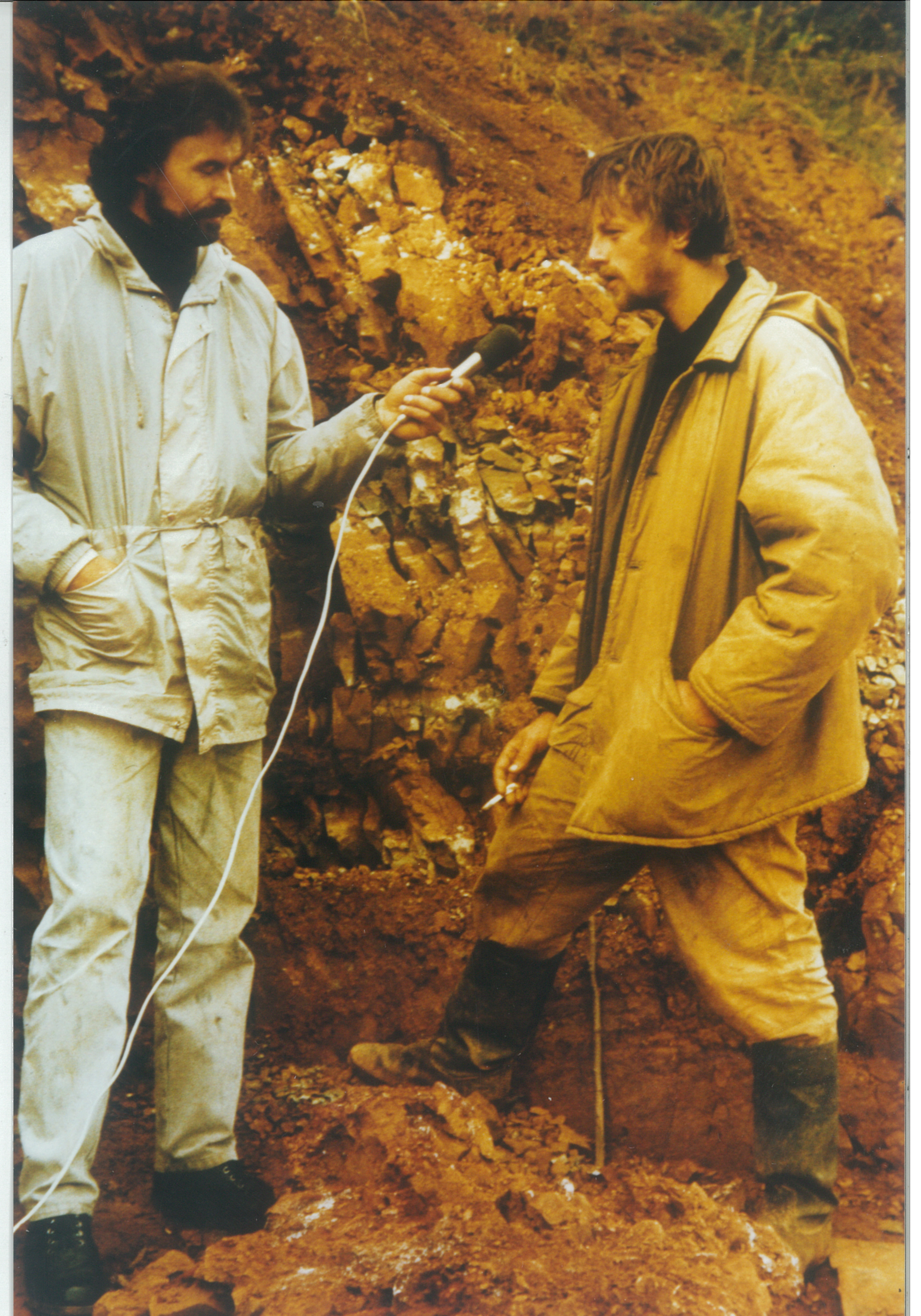
- Russian paleontologist D. L. Sumin (right) being interviewed in 1992 during excavations at the Kotel'nich site
- Type: Biozone

Location
- Region: Kirov Oblast
- Country: Russia

The Kotel'nich Tetrapod Assemblage is a tetrapod assemblage zone (also called a biozone) in Russia. Its fossils are from "a red-coloured predominantly clay-argillite-siltstone sequence exposed on the right bank of the Vyatka River south of the town of Kotel’nich". It is dated to the late Capitanian age of the Middle Permian. The type locality (Kotel'nich, or Kotel'nich 1) is in the Vanyushonki Member of the Vyatka Formation. The upstream Port Kotel'nich (Kotel'nich 2) locality, dominated by dicynodonts of genus Australobarbarus, was traditionally also included in this assemblage; however, this is now questioned due to fossil and possible time differences.

== Paleobiota ==
Listed from Suchkova et al. (2026) unless otherwise cited.

=== Synapsids ===
==== Therocephalians ====
Therocephalians of the Kotel'nich Tetrapod Assemblage
Genus	Species	Notes	Images
Gorynychus	G. masyutinae	A wolf-sized therocephalian, the largest predator in the assemblage	
Karenites	K. ornamentatus	A small, possibly insectivorous therocephalian	
Koksharovia	K. grechovi	A small therocephalian	
Kotelcephalon	K. viatkensis		
Muchia	M. microdenta	Known only from a fragment of the lower jaw	
Perplexisaurus	P. foveatus	A small, potentially semiaquatic therocephalian	
Scalopodontes	S. kotelnichi		
Viatkosuchus	V. sumini	A large therocephalian	

==== Gorgonopsians ====
Gorgonopsians of the Kotel'nich Tetrapod Assemblage
Genus	Species	Notes	Images
Nochnitsa	N. geminidens	A very small, basal gorgonopsian	
Viatkogorgon	V. ivakhnenkoi	A small basal gorgonopsian, suggested to be nocturnal	

==== Anomodontians ====
Anomodontians of the Kotel'nich Tetrapod Assemblage
Genus	Species	Notes	Images
Dicynodontidae	indet.	An indeterminate dicynodontid known from a partial skull.	
Suminia	S. getmanovi	A small, tree-dwelling herbivore	

=== Reptiles ===
Reptiles of the Kotel'nich Tetrapod Assemblage
Genus	Species	Notes	Images
Deltavjatia	D. rossica	A pareiasaur; the largest and most common tetrapod in the assemblage	
Emeroleter	E. levis	A small lizard-like nycteroleterid	
