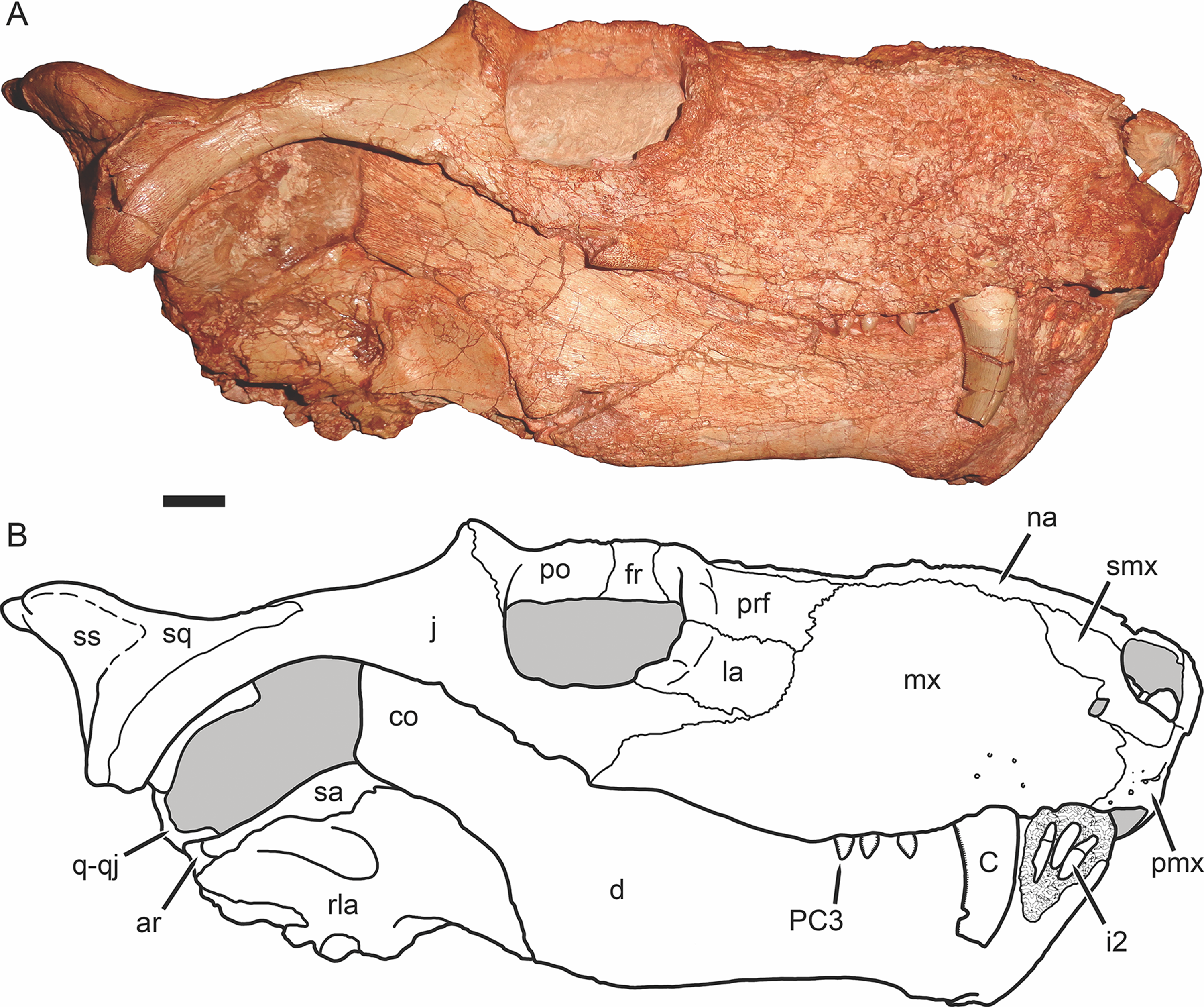
- Holotype skull of G. masyutinae

Scientific classification
- Kingdom: Animalia
- Phylum: Chordata
- Clade: Synapsida
- Clade: Therapsida
- Clade: †Therocephalia
- Genus: †Gorynychus; Kammerer & Masyutin, 2018

Type species
- †Gorynychus masyutinae Kammerer & Masyutin, 2018

Other species
- †G. sundyrensis Suchkova & Gobulev, 2019

= Gorynychus =

Gorynychus Temporal range: Middle-Late Permian (Capitanian-Wuchiapingian), 262–258 Ma

Genus of therapsids from the mid-Permian of Russia

Gorynychus is a genus of basal therocephalian from the Middle to Late Permian from Kotelnich, Russia. It was named after the three-headed dragon Zmey Gorynych (Змей Горыныч) from Russian mythology. The genus contains two species, G. masyutinae and G. sundyrensis. G. sundyrensis, along with Julognathus, were the only known large carnivores present in the Sundry Assemblage, replacing the anteosaurs, which went extinct following the transition from the Isheevo Assemblage Zone to Sundry Assemblage. With a skull length of 35–40 cm (14–16 in), it was one of the largest therocephalians.

The genus would survive the Capitanian mass extinction event, with G. masyuntinae, the type species, being found in the early Late Permian rocks of the Kotelnich Tetrapod Assemblage. Despite being notably smaller than G. sundyrensis, it was the top predator of the assemblage with only Viatkogorgon and Viatkosuchus approaching its size. Following the extinction of basal therocephalians, gorgonopsians would diversify and replace them as the dominant large bodied predators.

== Classification ==
Kammer and Masyutin (2018) recovered Gorynychus as a basal therocephalian just outside of Eutherocephalia. On the other hand, Suchkova and Golubev (2019) recovered Gorynychus as a lycosuchid, following the discovery of G. sundyrensis. Liu and Abdala, in their 2019 study, recovered Gorynychus as a sister taxon to Lycosuchus. However, in a later study, they recovered it intermediately between Lycosuchus and Scylacosauria.

Cladogram recovered by Liu & Abdala (2019):

- Theriodontia
  - Gorgonopsia
  - Eutheriodontia
    - Cynodontia
      - Charassognathus
      - - Procynosuchus
        - Dvinia
    - Therocephalia
      - - Gorynychus
        - Lycosuchus
      - - Scylacosauridae
          - - Pristerognathus
            - Glanosuchus
          - - Scylacosaurus
            - Pardosuchus
            - Ictidosaurus
            - Alopecodon
        - Eutherocephalia

Cladogram recovered by Liu & Abdala (2023):

- Theriodontia
  - Gorgonopsia
  - Eutheriodontia
    - Cynodontia
      - Charassognathus
      - - Dvinia
        - Procynosuchus
    - Therocephalia
      - Lycosuchus
      - - Gorynychus
        - - Scylacosauridae
            - Alopecodon
            - - Pardosuchus
              - - Scylacosaurus
                - Ictidosaurus
                - - Pristerognathus
                  - Glanosuchus
          - Eutherocephalia

== Description ==
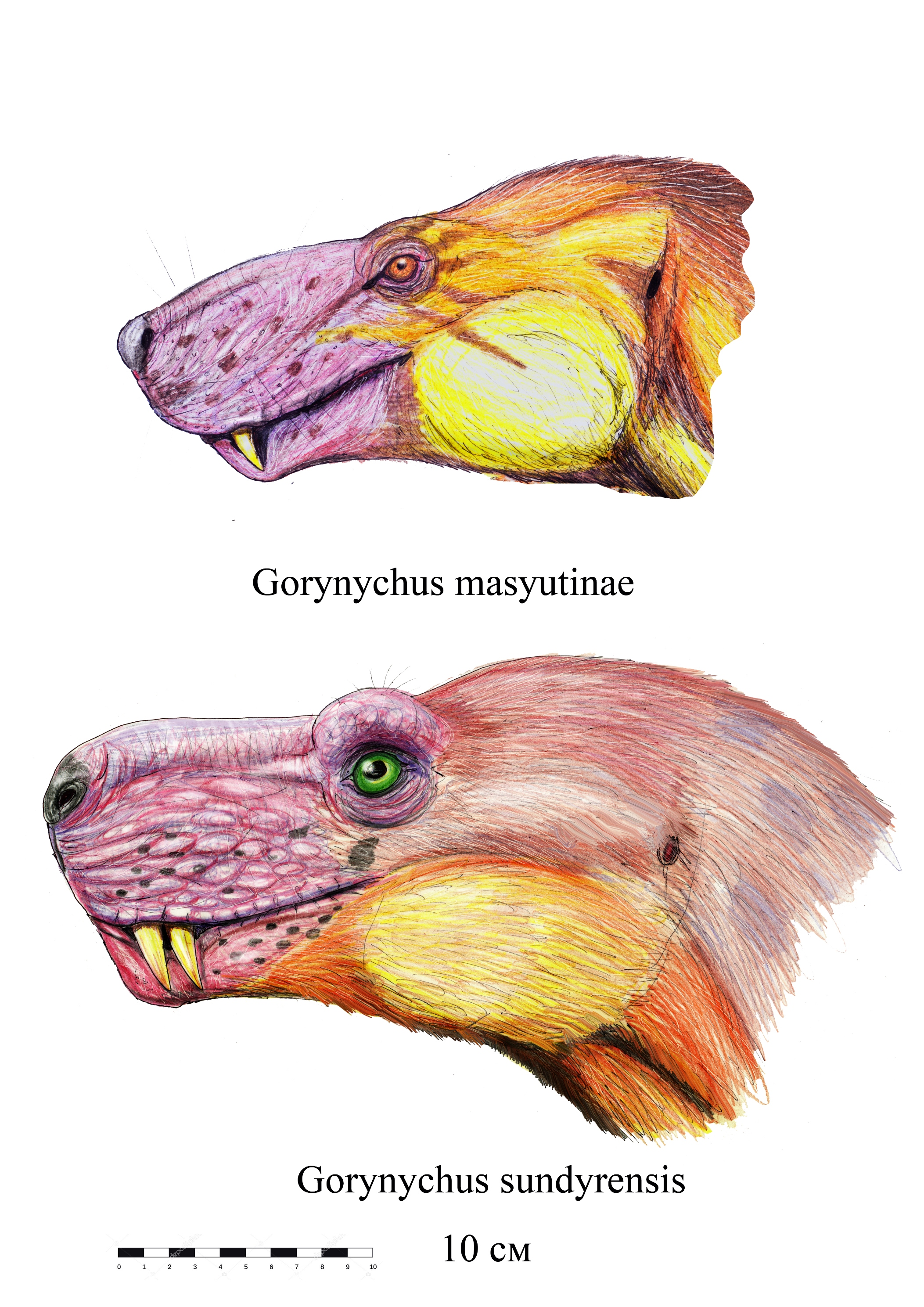
Restoration of the two species

G. masyutinae, only known from its holotype, was wolf-sized, with a skull length of 20 cm (7.9 in). Like many theriodonts, it had strongly developed and prominent canine teeth. The postcanine of Gorynychus was unique among therocephalians, being labiolingually compressed and were "leaf" or "spade" shaped, with proportionally long serrations on both mesial and distal edges. G. sundyrensis was estimated to have a skull length of 35–40 cm (14–16 in), making it one of the largest known therocephalians. It had four postcanine teeth compared to G. masyutinae, which had three. The premaxilla was low and relatively short and contained four incisors. The teeth of G. sundyrensis were noted to have been serrated.

== Paleoecology ==
=== Sundyr Assemblage ===
Within the Sundyr Assemblage fauna, G. sundyrensis coexisted with the more common Julognathus, with both therocephalians coexisting by niche partitioning, with Gorynychus occupying a scavenger niche based lifetime wears of the tooth crowns. Large herbivores are poorly known, only represented by dinocephalians possibly similar to Ulemosaurus, while small herbivores were represented by the anomodont Parasuminia. A number of other tetrapods are also known from this assemblage, including Leptoropha aff. talonophora, Microphon, Enosuchus sp., and the chroniosuchian Suchonica, as well as the temnospondyl amphibian Dvinosaurus gubini.

The Sundry Assemblage was the terminal stage of the Dinocephalian tetrapod fauna before the Capitanian mass extinction, representing a crisis stage in the development of the tetrapod community in Eastern Europe and was transition from the Dinocephalian fauna to the Theriodontian fauna of the Late Permian. The presence of dinocephalians suggests the assemblage correlated with the uppermost subzone of Tapinocephalus Assemblage Zone. Compared to the older Isheevo Assemblage Zone, the aquatic fauna was more similar to the Theriodontian faunas, with the chroniosuchids, karpinskiosaurids, and kotlassids appearing and becoming abundant. On the other hand, the last archegosauroids went extinct. Within the terrestrial fauna, anteosaurs went extinct and were replaced by large therocephalians.

=== Kotelnich Tetrapod Assemblage ===
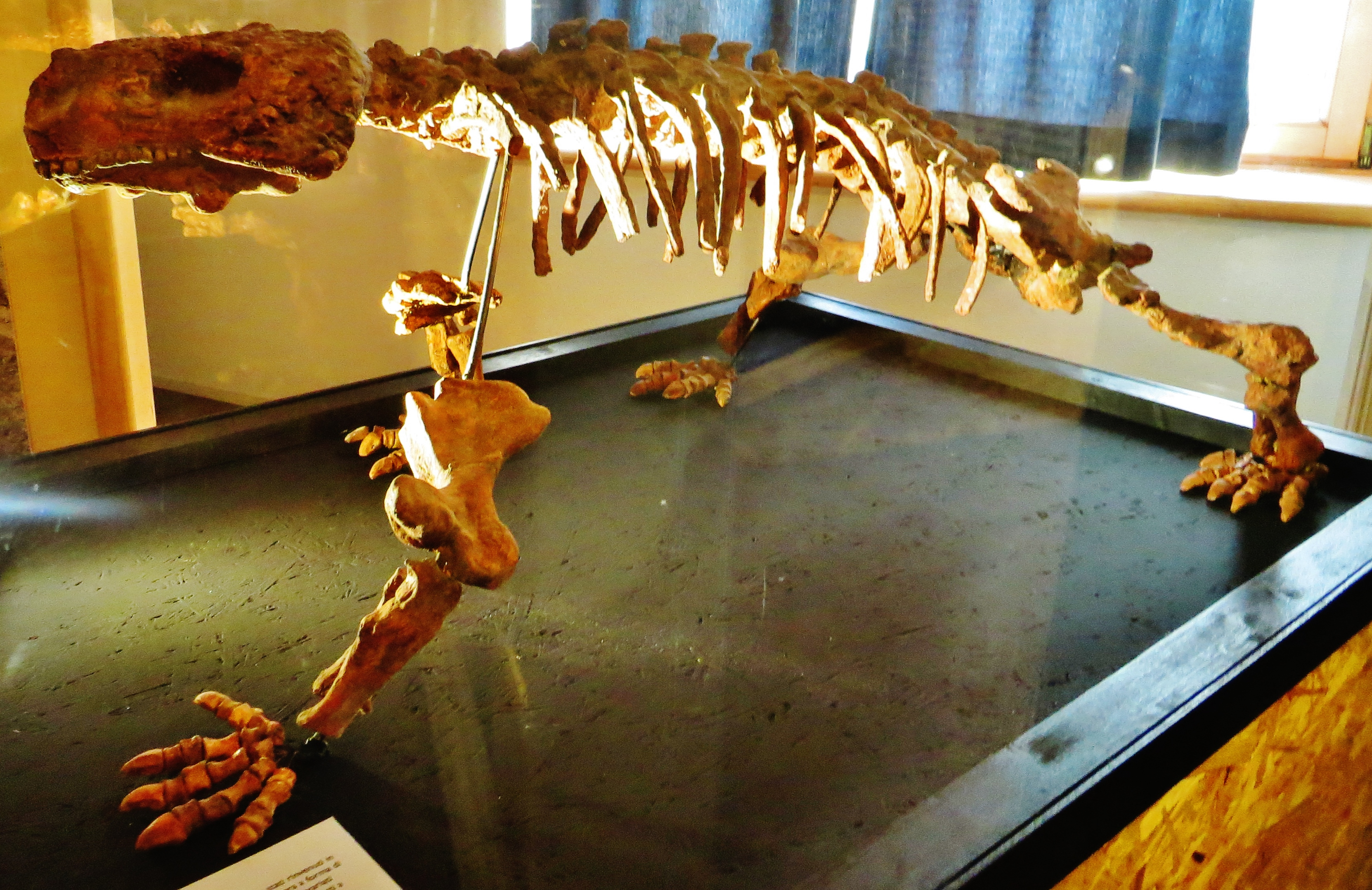
Skeleton of the pareiasaur Deltavjatia, which is very abundant at the Kotelnich locality

G. masyuntinae was recovered in the Kotelnich Tetrapod Assemblage. The depositional environment of the assemblage was thought to have been a lacustrine or floodplain system. Contemporary fauna include the pareiasaur Deltavjatia, the anomodont Suminia, gorgonopsians Viatkogorgon and Nochnitsa, and other therocephalians including Chlynovia serridentatus, Viatkosuchus sumini, and Karenites ornamentatus. G. masyuntinae was the largest predator in the Kotelnich tetrapod assemblage, with only Viatkogorgon and Viatkosuchus approaching it in size.

The date of the tetrapod assemblage was marked with uncertainty, with some studies suggesting it dated to the latest Middle Permian. However, recent studies suggest the tetrapod assemblage was instead dated to the earliest Late Permian. Anomodont comparisons suggest the Kotelnich assemblage may have been equivalent to the South African Tropidostoma-Gorgonops Subzone. While some experts have suggested equivalency between Kotelnich assemblage and Lycosuchus-Eunotosaurus Subzone, the described fauna of therocephalians between both assemblages were vastly different, with Kotelnich assemblage consisting mostly of eutherocephalians while lycosuchids and scylacosaurids were more rare. However, the presence of both basal and derived therapsids shows a stronger correlation to the Lycosuchus-Eunotosaurus Subzone than Tropidostoma-Gorgonops Subzone. Despite being equivalent to the lowest subzone of Endothiodon Assemblage Zone, the most abundant tetrapod in the fauna was the pareiasaur Deltavjatia, in contrast, dicynodont therapsids were the most abundant tetrapods in South African faunas.

Gorynychus, as well as other surviving basal therocephalians, would later be replaced by gorgonopsians, who became the dominant predators for the remainder of the Late Permian.
