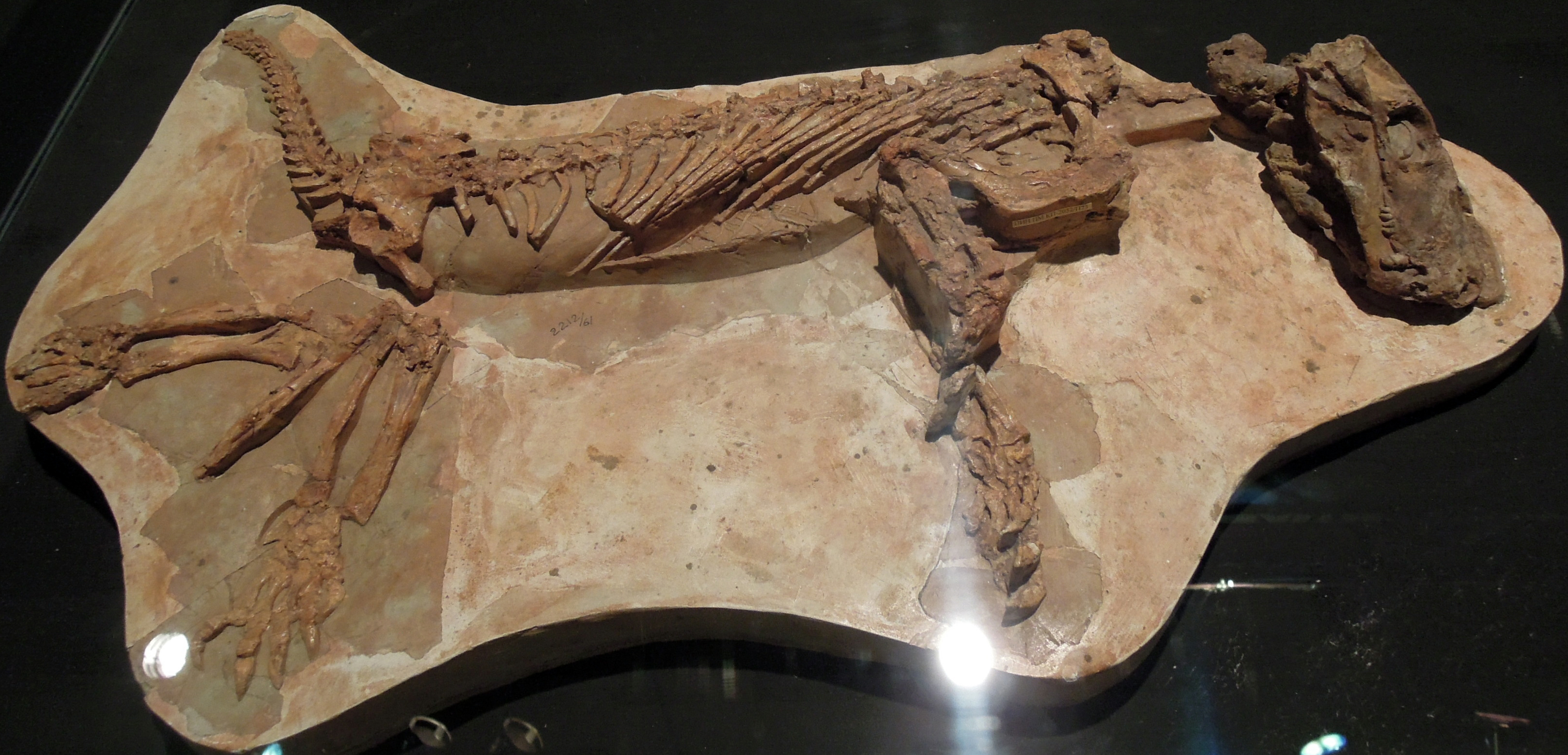
- Holotype skeleton exhibited in Dinosaurium, Prague

Scientific classification
- Kingdom: Animalia
- Phylum: Chordata
- Clade: Synapsida
- Clade: Therapsida
- Clade: †Gorgonopsia
- Genus: †Viatkogorgon; Tatarinov, 1999

Type species
- Viatkogorgon ivakhnenkoi Tatarinov, 1999

= Viatkogorgon =

Viatkogorgon Temporal range: Permian ~260–256 Ma

Extinct genus of therapsids

Viatkogorgon is a genus of gorgonopsian (a type of therapsid, the group that includes modern mammals) that lived during the Permian period in what is now Russia. The first fossil was found at the Kotelnich locality near the Vyatka River and was made the holotype of the new genus and species V. ivakhnenkoi in 1999. The generic name refers to the river and the related genus Gorgonops—the gorgons of Greek mythology are often referenced in the names of the group. The specific name honors the paleontologist Mikhail F. Ivakhnenko. The holotype skeleton is one of the most complete gorgonopsian specimens known and includes rarely preserved elements such as gastralia (abdominal ribs) and a scleral ring (a bony ring inside the eye). A larger, but poorly preserved specimen has also been assigned to the species.

The holotype specimen is about 80 cm (31 in) long, including the 14 cm (5.5 in) long skull, making Viatkogorgon a relatively small gorgonopsian. The assigned specimen is larger, with a 17 cm (6.7 in) long skull, and the holotype may have been young. As a gorgonopsian, it would have been skeletally robust with a somewhat dog-like stance, though with outwards-turned elbows. The snout was high, and the teeth were generally recurved (curved backward), pointed, and serrated. The canines (the saber teeth) were much larger than the incisors at the front and postcanines behind but relatively small for a gorgonopsian. Viatkogorgon was characterized by its unusually large eye socket and scleral ring. It was distinct from other gorgonopsians in that the lower end of the postorbital bar was narrow, and it had a very large sulcus (or furrow) at the back of the skull on each side. Since gorgonopsians have been described mainly from skulls, it is uncertain how widespread the postcranial features of Viatkogorgon were in other members of the group. The skeleton of Viatkogorgon was unusual in having gastralia, in that the tail was differentiated with a front and hind part, with the former less flexible, and in that some of the foot bones and its digits were reduced in size and interconnected.

Gorgonopsians were a group of carnivorous stem mammals with saber teeth that disappeared at the end of the Permian. Phylogenetic analysis has found Viatkogorgon to be one of the earliest-diverging gorgonopsians, after Nochnitsa, also from Kotelnich. All other gorgonopsians appear to belong to two, later-diverging Russian and African groups. Viatkogorgon's proportionally large scleral ring suggests nocturnal habits. Gorgonopsians would have been relatively fast predators, killing their prey by delivering slashing bites with their saber teeth. The skeleton of Viatkogorgon had features such as a vertebral column with increased vertical curvature, including the hind part of the tail, and restricted mobility of some digits of the feet, likened to a flipper-like structure indicating it may have been a relatively good swimmer. The age of the Vanyushonki Member of the Kotelnich succession, from which Viatkogorgon is known, is not determined but is thought to date to either the late or middle Permian epoch.

== Discovery ==
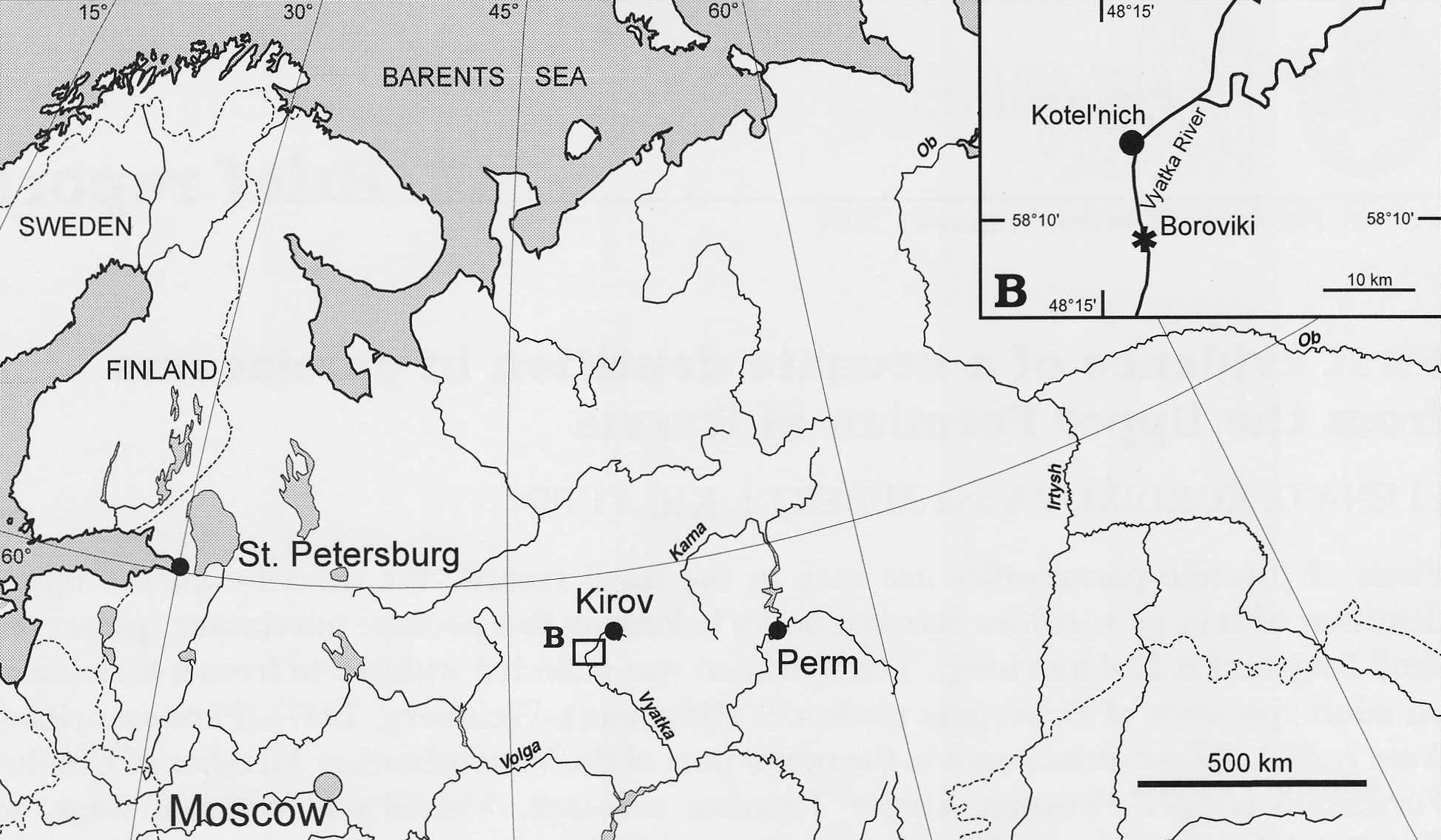
Map showing the Kotelnich locality in Russia where Viatkogorgon was found (lower middle left box, magnified in inset box at upper right). The Vyatka River, for which the genus was named, is also visible.

In 1999, the paleontologist Leonid P. Tatarinov described and named a new genus and species of gorgonopsian, Viatkogorgon ivakhnenkoi. The holotype specimen (cataloged as PIN 2212/61 in the Paleontological Institute of the Russian Academy of Sciences in Moscow), on which the scientific name is based, was found in 1992 at the Kotelnich locality of Kotelnichsky District, in Russia's Kirov Oblast. The Kotelnich locality contains a series of Permian exposures on the banks of the Vyatka River.

The generic name Viatkogorgon refers to the Vyatka River, and to Gorgonops, the name of a related genus. The name "gorgon", referring to the monstrous hags of Greek mythology, is often used in the generic names of gorgonopsians. The specific name ivakhnenkoi honors the paleontologist Mikhail F. Ivakhnenko. The specific name was spelled V. ivachnenkovi in a 2001 article by the paleontologists Elena G. Kordikova and Albert J. Khlyupin, a spelling which Tatarinov modified slightly in 2004 as V. ivachnenkoi, while some other researchers have continued using the original spelling. Russian gorgonopsid discoveries began in the 1890s with the finding of Inostrancevia, one of the largest members of the group. There were fewer finds during the 20th century, with Viatkogorgon being the first recognized gorgonopsian from Russia, the only place outside Africa where the group is definitely known, since 1974.

The holotype skeleton is one of the most complete gorgonopsian specimens known (a 2023 study called it the most complete), and preserves almost the entire postcranial skeleton (the rest of the skeleton apart from the skull). This includes elements rarely preserved intact in therapsids (the group in which gorgonopsians belong), such as the gastralia (or abdominal ribs, a feature found among reptiles, for example). The skull is relatively poorly preserved in comparison, with the left side and the palate badly broken. The skull roof is reconstructed in plaster, except for the snout tip and left postorbital bone (the bone that formed the hind border of the eye socket). Overall, the skull is also compressed from side to side, which makes it narrower than it would have been in life when viewed from above. The scleral rings (bony rings inside the eye), particularly the right one, are preserved, which is otherwise uncommonly preserved in theriodont (the sub-group of therapsids to which gorgonopsians belong) fossils. The proatlas, atlas and axis (the first bones of the vertebral column) are attached to the skull.

Tatarinov only described the skull of Viatkogorgon in the 1999 article, wherein he also named the new scylacosaur genus Kotelcephalon, because the article was restricted in volume, but he preliminarily described the postcranium in 2004. In 2018, the paleontologists Christian F. Kammerer and Vladimir Masyutin redescribed the skull of Viatkogorgon and stated that a detailed description of the postcranium would greatly improve understanding of gorgonopsian skeletal anatomy, but noted it was unavailable for study during their research, as it was part of a traveling exhibition. They also named the new gorgonopsian Nochnitsa from Kotelnich in the article. In 2002, Ivakhnenko reported an additional, larger Viatkogorgon specimen (cataloged as PIN 4678/5), which is very poorly preserved.

== Description ==
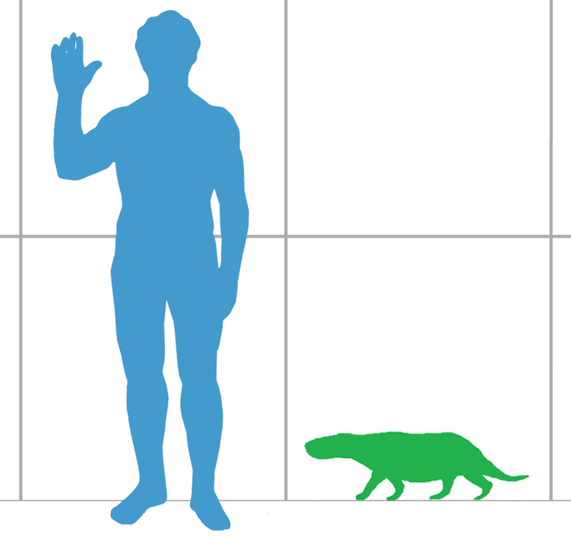
Size compared to a human

The almost complete Viatkogorgon holotype specimen is about 80 cm (31 in) long, including the skull. The skull is 14 cm (5.5 in), the preserved part of the tail is approximately 17 cm (6.7 in), the forelimb is approximately 24 cm (9.4 in), and the hindlimb is more than 26.5 cm (10.4 in). It was relatively small for a gorgonopsian; for comparison, Inostrancevia and Rubidgea measured at least 3 m (120 in) in length. Ivakhnenko suggested in 2002 that the holotype specimen was possibly a young individual, based on it having a narrow postorbital bar; the width of this bar widened with age in Estemmenosuchus, for example. For comparison, the skull of the larger assigned specimen is 17 cm (6.7 in) long, and its postorbital bar is 1 cm (0.39 in) wide, while that of the holotype is 0.6 cm (0.24 in). The skull length was therefore increased 1.3-fold, and the width of the postorbital bar was increased by a factor of 1.6. Gorgonopsians were skeletally robust, yet long-limbed for therapsids, with a somewhat dog-like stance, though with outwards-turned elbows. It is unknown whether non-mammaliaform therapsids such as gorgonopsians were covered in hair or not.

=== Skull ===
The snout of Viatkogorgon was high and narrow, though much of the skull's narrowness was due to sideways compression of the fossil. The premaxilla (the frontmost bone of the upper jaw) was little exposed on the side surface of the snout, as in Nochnitsa. The internarial bar (which divided the nostrils) curved slightly hindward in side view, so that the lower front margin of the snout was blunt rather than pointed. The upper tip of the premaxilla extended to the upper front edge of the bony nostril. Few of the upper incisors (front teeth) are preserved intact in the holotype, but the partial tooth roots and tooth sockets show it would have had five incisors on each side, as is typical for gorgonopsians. The upper incisors were weakly curved and spatulate (spoon-shaped), with clear serrations towards their tips. It is uncertain if they decreased in size further back in the tooth-row, because the holotype's only two intact incisors are the same tooth of each side (I5). In general, the teeth were pointed, flattened on the outer side, and somewhat convex on the inner side, and the serrated area of each tooth was displaced towards the outer edge of the crowns. The septomaxilla (a small bone between the nasal bone and the maxilla, the main bone of the upper jaw) had a shorter side facing process than Nochnitsa.

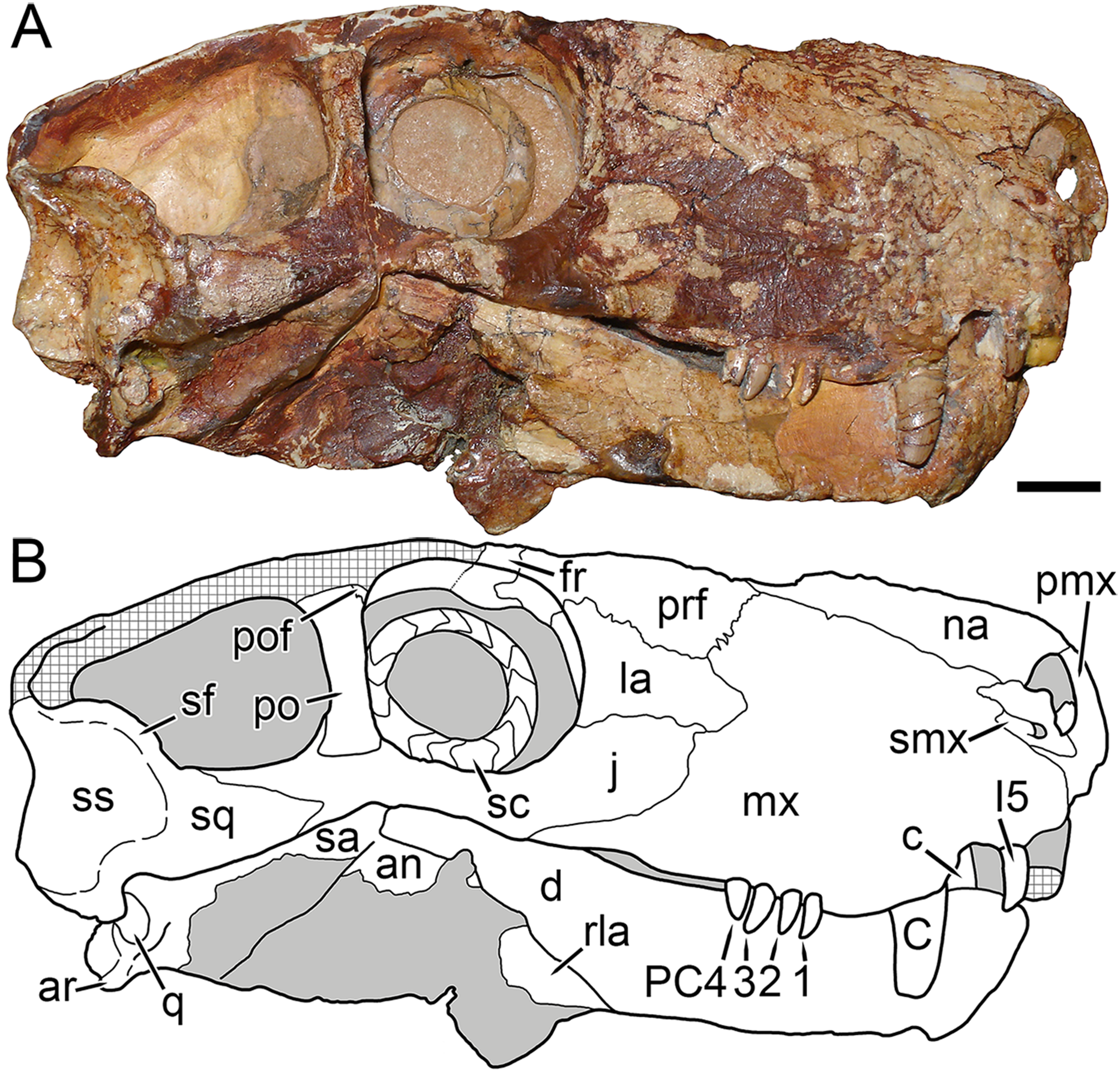
Holotype skull and diagram; gray indicates rock matrix, hatching indicates plaster reconstruction.

The maxilla was proportionally taller and shorter from front to back than in Nochnitsa, and whereas the upper margin of the latter's maxilla was rounded, there was a broad process that extended hindward between the nasal and lacrimal bone (a bone that formed the front border of the eye socket) in Viatkogorgon. The hindward directed process that formed the lower margin of the maxilla was shorter than in Nochnitsa, not reaching the midpoint of the eye socket. The "step" by the diastema (gap) between the incisors and the canine (the saber-tooth) was deeper than in Nochnitsa, and the part of the maxilla that bore the canine was very convex, which gave the impression of a "flange" when seen in side view. The canine was relatively small for a gorgonopsian, as was the case in Nochnitsa, and bore serrations on its hind edge. The tooth row behind the canine was short and consisted of four closely packed postcanines, which were recurved (curved backwards), unlike those of Nochnitsa. The postcanines were substantially shorter than the incisors, a regular feature of gorgonopsians, and almost three times shorter than the canines. There was a weak margin above the postcanine tooth-row on the maxilla, to a larger extent than Nochnitsa, but less than in the gorgonopsian Eriphostoma and rubidgeines.

The nasal bone of Viatkogorgon was somewhat broader at the front (by the hind edge of the bony nostril) than in Nochnitsa. The prefrontal bone (at the forehead, above and in front of the eye) was proportionally shorter than in Nochnitsa and contributed less to the upper front margin of the eye socket, where the lacrimal bone formed a larger part instead. Viatkogorgon was characterized by its unusually large eye socket with its proportionally large scleral ring. The diameter of the eye socket was 2.8 cm (1.1 in), while the outer diameter of the scleral ring was 2.3 cm (0.91 in), and its inner diameter 1.5 cm (0.59 in). The ring consisted of 15 ossicles (small bones also termed plates) which overlapped each other with no gaps, and the rims of the ring were regularly rounded. The jugal bone, which formed the lower border of the eye socket of Viatkogorgon, formed a more extensive part of the side of the face than in Nochnitsa.

Viatkogorgon was distinct from all gorgonopsians except Nochnitsa in that the lower end of the postorbital bar (between the eye socket and the temporal fenestra opening behind the eye socket) was narrow, forming a straight rod when seen in side view. It was broader and lacked the curvature seen in the bar of Nochnitsa. In other gorgonopsians, the lower end of the postorbital bar was expanded where it contacted the jugal bone, even if the rest of the upper length of this bar was narrow. The skull of Viatkogorgon was also distinct in having a very large sulcus (or furrow) on the squamosal bone on each side at the back of the skull, which extended onto a squamosal flange which impinged on the lower edge of the temporal fenestra. Apart from being much larger and expansive than the squamosal sulcus of Nochnitsa, this feature had a distinct boundary and a flange that pointed back and down in both.

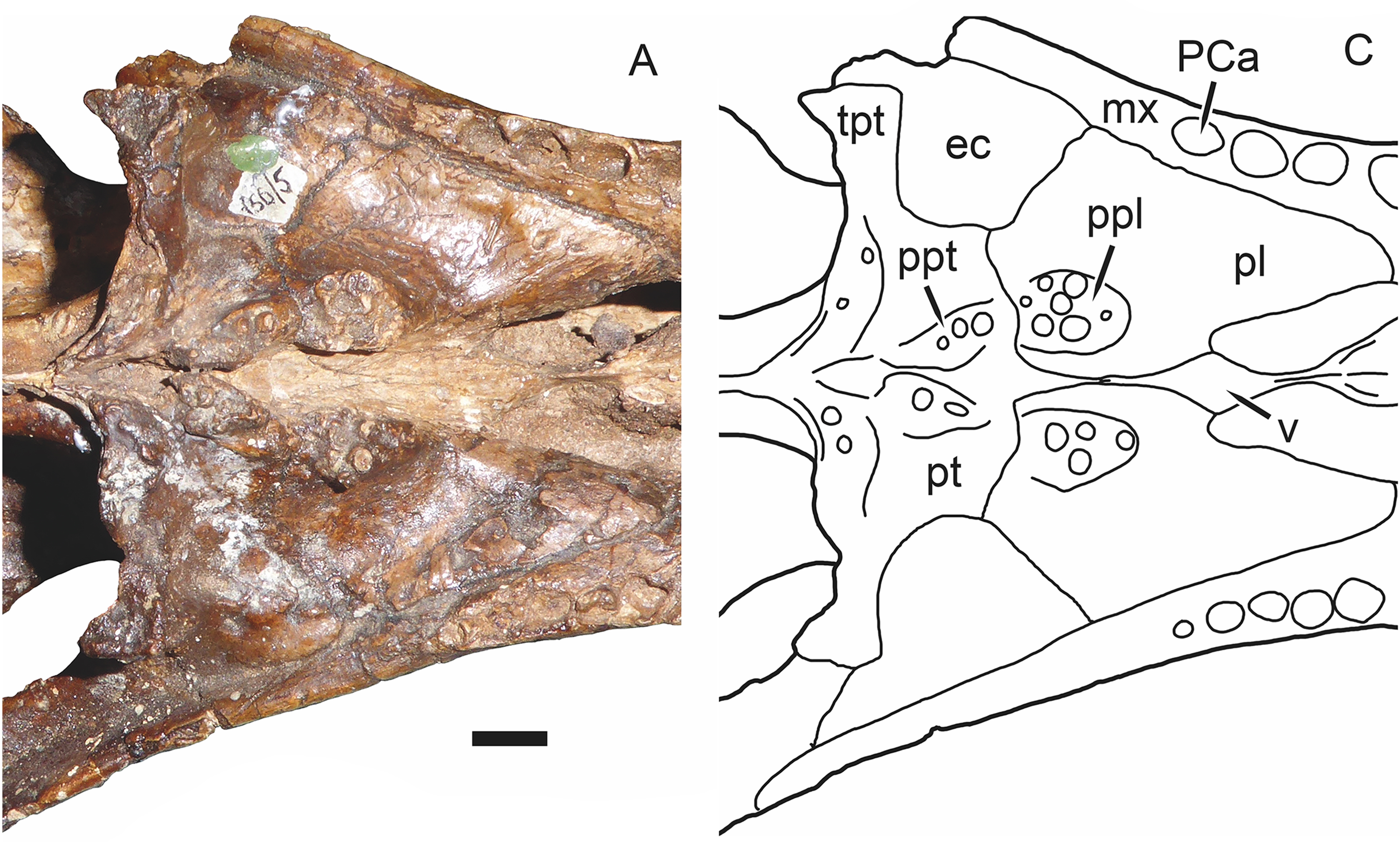
Photo and diagram showing the palate of the gorgonopsian Sauroctonus, which had a similar configuration of palatine and pterygoid tubercles with teeth (ppl and ppt)

The palatal structure of Viatkogorgon was typical for gorgonopsians. It had teeth on the palatine bone (bony palate) placed on stout tubercles (also called bosses, with 15–18 teeth on each), which formed two rows that extended along the outer and inner edges of each tubercle. Each tooth row formed two lines, with the outer line being longer than the inner. The surface of the tubercle was weakly concave and smooth between the teeth. There were also tooth-bearing tubercles on the pterygoid bone behind the palatine bone, though less developed, and the teeth here (12–13 on each) were similar to those of Sauroctonus. They were much smaller than the palatine teeth, covered the entire surface of the tubercles, and formed three rows. There were also teeth on the transverse processes of the pterygoid, which formed only one row mainly on the inner part, unlike in Sauroctonus. Unlike the teeth on the tubercles, these teeth were strongly worn and probably not replaced in adults.

The lower jaw of Viatkogorgon was typical for gorgonopsians, unlike that of Nochnitsa, with a tall mandibular symphysis (the area where the two halves of the mandible connected at the front) and distinct mentum (or "chin"). The lower jaw was somewhat shorter than the upper jaw. The lower teeth are badly preserved in the holotype, but they appear to have been very similar to the upper; the single preserved incisor is recurved and spatulate, and the lower postcanine is weakly recurved, and both at least have serrations on their hind edges. The dentary bone (the tooth-bearing bone at the front of the lower jaw) was generally taller than that of Nochnitsa, and its coronoid process (part of where the jaw connected to the skull) sloped more sharply, with a weakly concave hind edge, as is typical in gorgonopsians. The articular bone (which formed the jaw-joint) was typical of gorgonopsians and had a downward protruding retroarticular process (a process at the back of the jaw where muscles attached).

=== Vertebrae and ribs ===
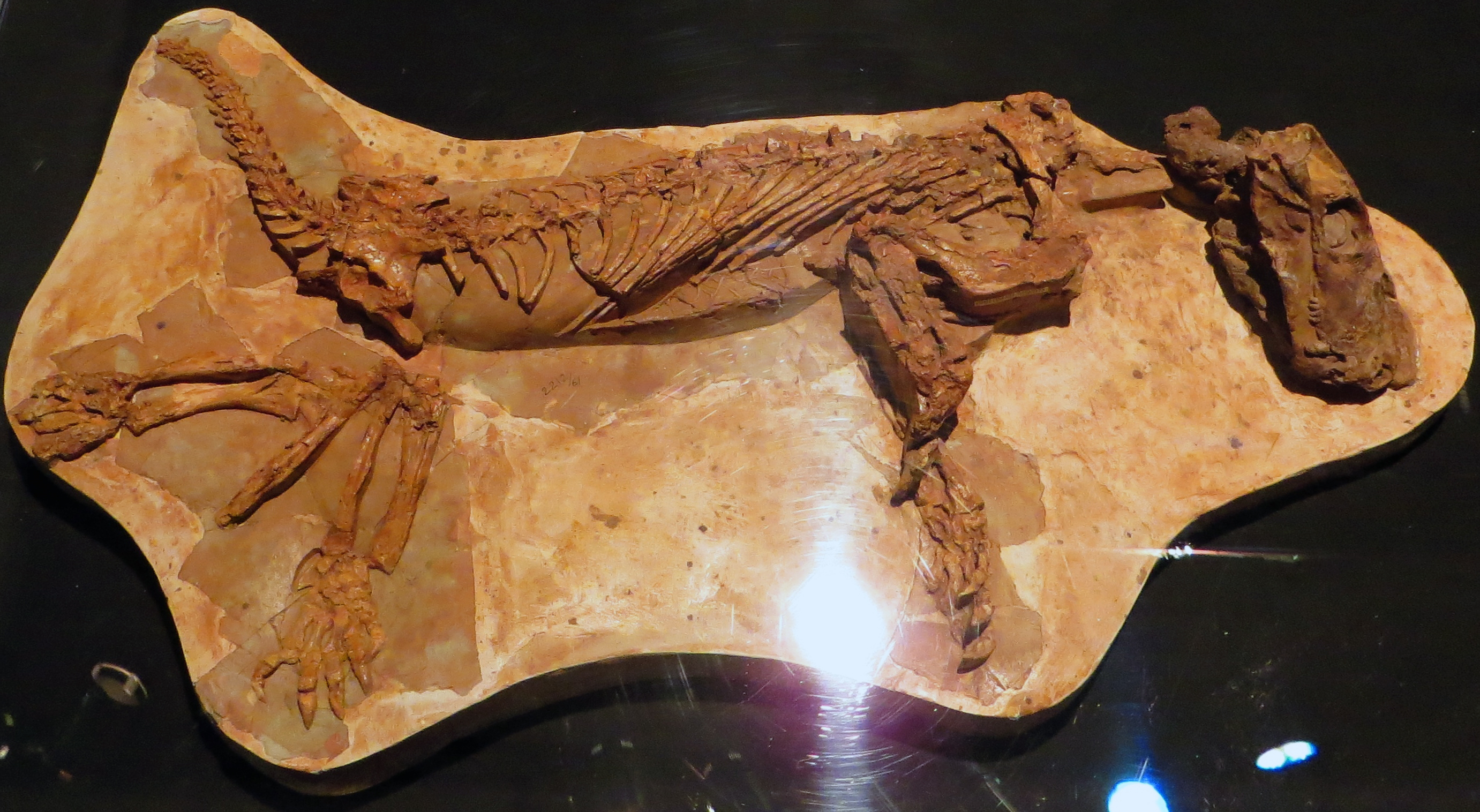
Holotype skeleton; note rare gastralia (abdominal ribs) behind the forelimbs, below the frontmost ribs.

Since gorgonopsians have been described mainly from remains of their skulls, with scant known postcranial remains, it is uncertain how widespread the postcranial features of Viatkogorgon were in other members of the group. Viatkogorgon had seven cervical vertebrae (of the neck), twenty or twenty-one thoracic vertebrae (of the body in front of the pelvis, fifteen when excluding the five lumbar vertebrae, those between the ribcage and the pelvis), three sacral vertebrae (associated with the pelvis), and at least twenty caudal vertebrae (of the tail). The structure of the atlas was similar to other gorgonopsians, and the other neck vertebrae were massive, particularly the axis. The axis had a relatively large intercentrum, a very large neural spine, which expanded from front to back, and a very high front side. The zygapophyses (the articular processes that connected adjacent vertebrae) were horizontal in the axis but became more vertical beginning by the third vertebra.

The thoracic vertebrae of Viatkogorgon were somewhat shorter than the lumbar vertebrae, and their neural spines were moderately tall, with horizontal zygapophyses. The neural spines became somewhat taller beginning at the second third part of the thoracic region, and were vertical in side view, though in the hind part of this region they were inclined rearwards and their front edge became convex (showing the transition from thoracic to lumbar vertebrae). The front ten or eleven thoracic ribs were very long and directed back and down. They were closely adjoined and attached at the front edge of the centrum by two closely positioned articular heads, as in the other ribs. The hindmost four or five thoracic rib pairs shortened gradually, transitioning into the lumbar ribs, whose articular heads got closer together. The sternum (breast bone) was 13 mm (0.51 in) long, shaped like a rectangular plate, and had three costal processes on each side, similar to Aelurognathus. The gastralia of Viatkogorgon formed an unusual, latticed frame of segmentally arranged narrow bars, located under the frontmost thoracic ribs. The bars were arranged in two layers at an angle to each other, with at least thirteen bars extended frontwards and down at the deeper layer. The four at the upper layer continued the thoracic vertebrae and extended hindward and down. The left bars overlay the lower ends of the right bars in some cases, and these elements were much thinner and denser spaced than ribs. No element connecting the right and left ribs has been identified.

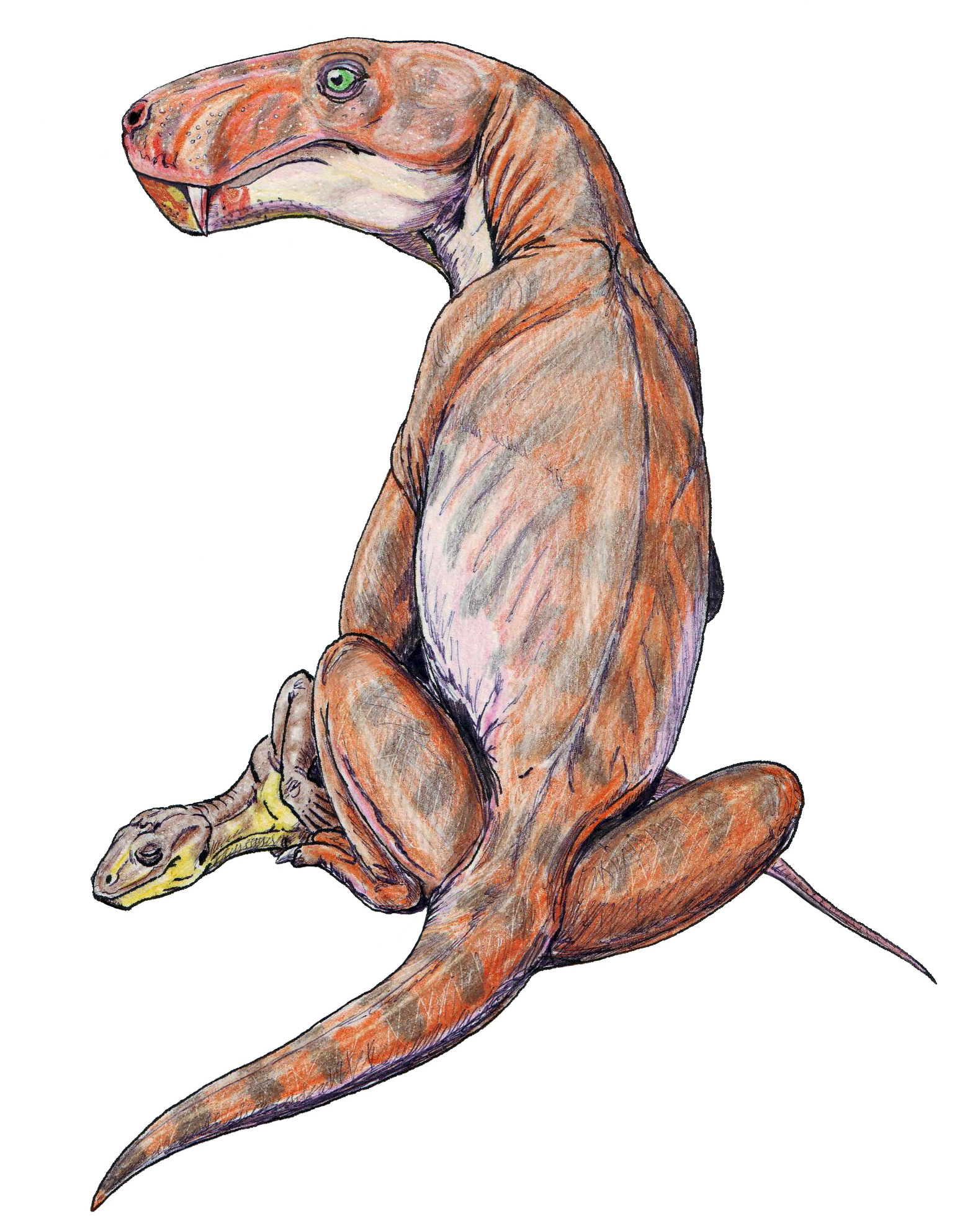
Life restoration of Viatkogorgon preying on the anomodont Suminia

The lumbar region was slightly differentiated from the thoracic region in having shorter ribs. The first and second lumbar ribs curved slightly hindward, were directed almost to the sides in the third, and curved slightly forwards in the hindmost two vertebrae. The lumbar ribs appear to have been single headed, unlike the thoracic ribs. The lumbar vertebrae were massive, longer than the thoracic ones, and had horizontally positioned zygagophyses and somewhat thickened neural spines, whose front edges narrowed towards the top. The three frontmost lumbar vertebrae had horizontal diapophyses (processes which projected from the sides of the neural arches over the neural canal of the vertebrae), while these turned in a vertical direction in the two hindmost ones, as seen in some other gorgonopsians. Of the three sacral vertebrae, only the hindmost two connected to the ilium of the pelvis by expanded ribs, the ends of which adjoined each other to form a common articular facet. The articular facet of the frontmost vertebra was isolated from the other two, and only connected with a shortened, rudimentary rib.

The tail region of Viatkogorgon was clearly differentiated into a front and hind part, the front part consisting of five caudal vertebrae which together measured 5.7–5.8 cm (2.2–2.3 in) in length. The ribs were short and massive in this part of the tail region. The zygapophyses were unusually inclined upwards, with their hind edges raised in relation to their front edges. The position of the zygapophyses would have restricted sideways movement at the base of the tail. The zygapophyses of the fourth and fifth caudal vertebrae were less inclined. The ribs of two of the front caudal vertebrae were 12 mm (0.47 in) long, whereas they shortened abruptly so that the rib of the fifth vertebra was only 4–5 mm (0.16–0.20 in) long. All the ribs here were double-headed, and all the neural spines were relatively massive, though they abruptly decreased in length hindward. The hind part of the tail consisted of 15 vertebrae, which lacked caudal ribs. In at least four of these vertebrae, the zygapophyses were almost raised to the extent of those of the vertebrae that adjoined their front, while they were positioned almost horizontally towards the back. The neural spines here were low and narrow, and the space between the vertebrae had well-developed hypapophyses (processes that project down from the vertebrae) that did not taper. The hypapophyses were inclined hindward and adjoined two vertebrae at the front, and covered the hypapophyses hindward adjoining vertebrae from below.

=== Limbs and limb girdles ===
The scapula (shoulder blade) was 7 cm (2.8 in) long, nearly 1 cm (0.39 in) wide at the joint with the humerus (upper arm bone), and its upper edge expanded to a width of 2.5 cm (0.98 in). A relatively low crest extended along the hind edge of the bone's lower third, and slightly deviated at the front from the edge of the scapula. The coracoids (part of the pectoral girdle in vertebrates other than mammals) were displaced somewhat upwards and closely adjoined the inner surface of the scapula, projecting from the front and back of that bone. The external foramen (opening) of the coracoid opened in front of the scapula. The internal foramen opened into an incisure between the procoracoid and the scapula, a position also seen only in Gorgonops among gorgonopsians. The humerus was shorter than the femur (thigh bone), 9.5 cm (3.7 in) and 10.3 cm (4.1 in) long respectively but much more massive. The deltopectoral crest (where muscles attached to the upper arm) of Viatkogorgon projected to about the same extent as in Sauroctonus but with a more poorly developed greater trochanter (a site for muscle attachment). The humerus of Viatkogorgon was similar to that of Aelurognathus, though with a more massive elbow joint, almost 2 cm (0.79 in) in diameter across.

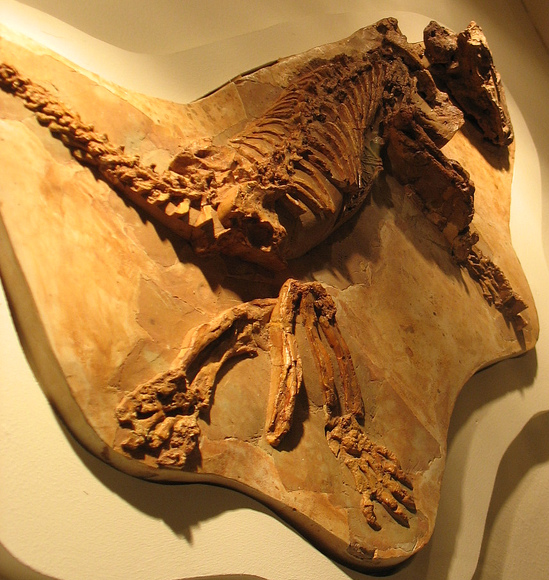
Angled view of the holotype skeleton, emphasizing the hindlimbs

The lower epicondyles (the rounded parts at the end of a bone) of the humerus were very well-developed and projected far above the surfaces that articulated with the lower bones, with rough crests at the edges. The crest on the medial epicondyle (associated with the radius of the lower arm) was massive, and the crest of the lateral epicondyle (associated with the ulna) was longer, 20% of the humerus' length but less massive. Most other gorgonopsians did not have as prominent and sculptured lateral epicondyles, except for one indeterminate specimen. There were two epicondylar foramina, one more extended and in a more upward position, the difference between the two being greater than in Lycaenops. The strongly developed upper epicondyles made the humerus of Viatkogorgon s-shaped, while those of almost all other gorgonopsians were only slightly concave on one side. The lower arm was about 7 cm (2.8 in) long. The radius was narrower than the ulna but also flattened from top to bottom. The ulna was much more massive than the radius and had a well-developed ulnar process. The ulna was flattened from top to bottom, and its upper part had a roughened area bordered by crests, which marked where the flexor muscles of the hand originated.

Viatkogorgon's hand was narrow and about 7 cm (2.8 in) long. The middle digits projected to a larger extent than the ones on the foot and had a typical gorgonopsian structure. Viatkogorgon was unusual in having two small additional centrale bones among the carpal bones of the hands, while most other gorgonopsians had only one. The fifth digit of the hand was very specialized, and its structure was superficially like the human thumb, the first digit in the human hand. The other digits were more typical in appearance. The first digit had short bones, and the third digit was the longest, like other gorgonopsians, but its length exceeded the others to a larger extent. The phalanx bones of the fourth digit were complex, their outer ends having a disk-like element that attached tightly with the main part of the phalanges, yet these were of the same length as the ordinary phalanges.

The ilium of Viatkogorgon differed from that of Lycaenops in that its preacetabular part (the part in front of the acetabulum, the hip joint where the femur connected) was better developed with a pronounced muscular depression. This probably provided an area for attachment for the iliotibial muscle that connected with the lower leg. The upper margin of the ilium was raised far above where this bone articulated with the sacrum and had a longitudinal crest on the inner surface. This was separated from another crest by a fossa which, along with a broad depression, may have provided an area of attachment for part of the ilio-pubo-femoralis internus muscle. The pubic bone was thickened, rod-like, and directed forwards and down at an angle of about 45 degrees, resembling the pubic bones of archosaurian reptiles (the group that includes crocodiles and dinosaurs). The acetabulum was very large and horizontally elongated, measuring over 20 mm (0.79 in) long and 15 mm (0.59 in) high. On the lower edge of this opening, a notch separated the ischium from the pubic bone.

The femur was proportionally long, 10.3 cm (4.1 in), 70% of the skull's length. It was more massive than that of Lycaenops, and curved along its long axis, to the same extent as in Sauroctonus. The head of the femur was round, about 12 mm (0.47 in) in diameter, directed inward at about a 30-degree angle, and its surface was well-built. The femoral head narrowed towards its back, and it likely entered the hind part of the acetabulum. The greater trochanter descended to about the femur's mid-length. Two long crests extended along the bone, above and below the front of the greater trochanter. The first was probably the inner trochanter, which was typically present in gorgonopsians, but the other has not been identified previously in the group. The lower leg was shorter than the femur, 9 cm (3.5 in) at most, and its surface sculpturing was more pronounced than in other gorgonopsians, resembling cynodonts. The tibia (lower leg bone) of Viatkogorgon had structures not identified in other gorgonopsians, such as a flattened surface on the preaxial epicondyle, and a crest at the upper half back of the bone that bordered a broad area. The fibula (lower leg bone) was more massive than those of other gorgonopsians and had a massive sculptured crest at its middle; this surface sculpturing diminished towards the lower end of the fibula, and the crest abruptly decreased in height, features not seen in other gorgonopsians.

Viatkogorgon's foot was 7.5 cm (3.0 in) long, and its general structure was similar to those of other gorgonopsians, though some features were notable. The proximal row of bones towards the heel consisted of only two bones as in mammals—a massive astragalus and a fibulare. In the distal row at the front of the foot, the fourth and fifth tarsals were fused, as in other gorgonopsians, but the row of intermediate centralia in Viatkogorgon was unusually well-developed; gorgonopsians usually had only one centrale, whereas Viatkogorgon had an additional one. Another unusual feature was that the articular facets of the hindmost foot bones extended onto the front side of the fibula and tibia of the lower leg. The tarsus (the hindmost cluster of bones in the foot) was 2.5 cm (0.98 in) long, and the metatarsal bones (those between the tarsus and the digits) ranged from 0.8 cm (0.31 in), the first, to 2.1 cm (0.83 in), the fourth.

The foot's digits were short, the fourth being 2.5 cm (0.98 in), a little longer than the third. The digits varied slightly in length, with the second and fifth digits being only slightly shorter than the third and fourth. The shortening of the metatarsals added to the impression that the digits were short. The first and fifth digits were somewhat hooked; the first was relatively short, about 1.8 cm (0.71 in) long. The phalangeal formula (the number and distribution of phalanx bones in the digits) of gorgonopsians was similar to that of mammals, while the study of Viatkogorgon indicates there was a reduction in phalanges (leading to phalanges becoming disk-like) combined with fusion of them. In the first digit of the foot, two phalanges were almost completely fused. In the third digit the second and third phalanges were shortened and fused. The fourth digit had three phalanges that were shortened, almost disk-like, and fused. Therefore, the phalangeal formula was 1-2, 3, 3-4, 3-5, 3. There was contact between the metatarsals towards the back of the foot, as well as contacts between some metatarsals and phalanges and contacts between the bases of the second and third digits. Ligaments probably mediated the front contacts between the metatarsals and phalanges. The ungual phalanx (claw bone) of the fifth digit was notable in being hooked and somewhat lengthened.

== Classification ==
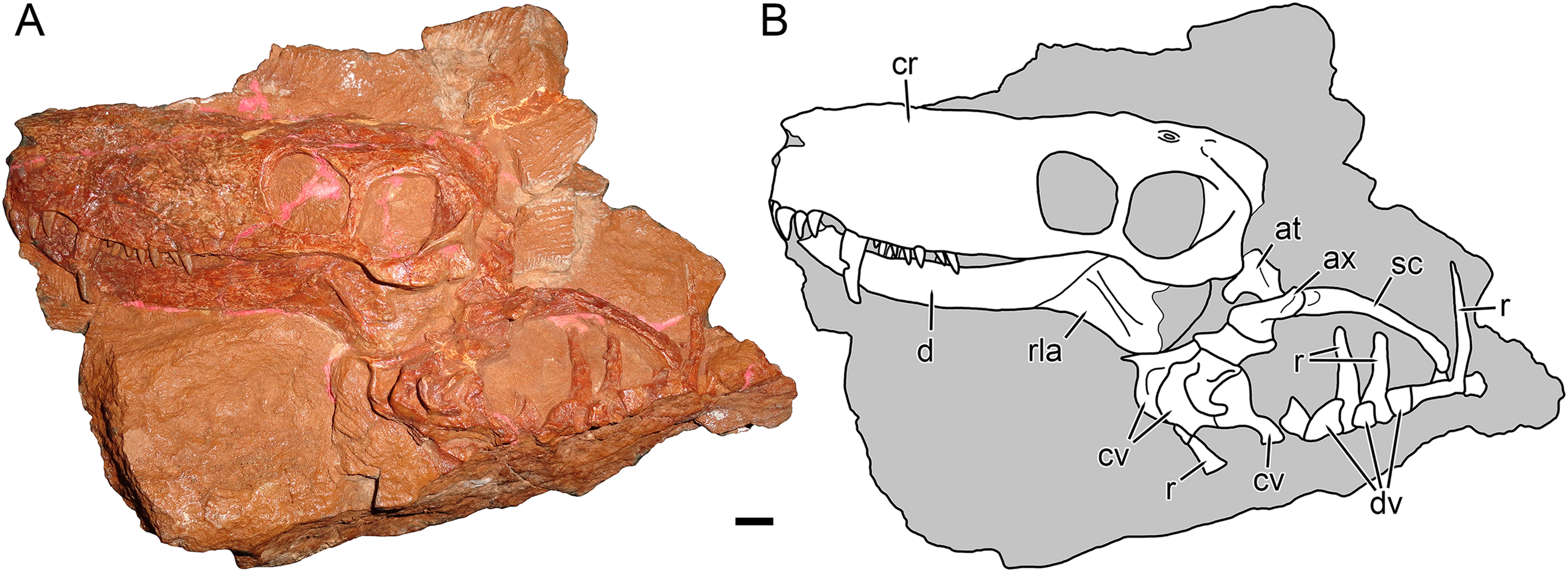
Holotype of Nochnitsa, the most basal gorgonopsian, followed by Viatkogorgon, and also from Kotelnich

Gorgonopsians were a group of carnivorous therapsids that included the apex predators of the late Permian. While they were abundant, they varied little in morphology. Though widespread in southern Africa during the Permian, they are poorly represented in the fossil record of the rest of the world, and only definitely known from Russia. Gorgonopsians were early synapsids, the group in which modern mammals belong; similar to reptiles in some respects, they are therefore considered stem-mammals (earlier inaccurately termed "mammal-like reptiles"). Gorgonopsians were the first group of predatory animals to develop saber teeth, long before true mammals and dinosaurs evolved. This feature later evolved independently multiple times in different predatory mammal groups, such as felids and thylacosmilids. Gorgonopsians disappeared with the end-Permian mass extinction.

In his 1999 description, Tatarinov found Viatkogorgon to belong in the gorgonopsian subfamily Sycosaurinae within the family Gorgonopsidae, based on features such as small size and the narrowness of the snout. This subfamily was not previously known from Russia. He also noted some similarities to members of the family Rubidgeidae. Ivakhnenko considered Sycosaurinae, including Viatkogorgon, to be part of Rubidgeidae in 2002. In his 2004 description of the postcranial skeleton, Tatarinov cautioned that this provided little information about the taxonomic position of Viatkogorgon among gorgonopsians—some features being unique and others occurring in other members of the group. The lack of information resulted from only a few gorgonopsians having had their skeletons examined. Nevertheless, he found the structure of its feet similar to gorgonopsians such as Arctognathus and Aelurognathus.

In 2018, Kammerer and Masyutin stated that while the early evolution of Gorgonopsia is poorly understood, Viatkogorgon and Nochnitsa expand the knowledge of gorgonopsians from the middle Permian or earliest late Permian of Laurasia, the northern landmass of the supercontinent Pangaea, consisting of what is now Eurasia and North America. In their phylogenetic analysis, Nochnitsa was found to be the basalmost (earliest-diverging) gorgonopsian followed by Viatkogorgon (based on its lack of a lower expansion on its postorbital bar, a feature seen in later-diverging genera), these being outside a clade grouping all other gorgonopsians. That clade was again divided into two groups, one consisting of Russian and the other consisting of African gorgonopsians, based on shared skull features.

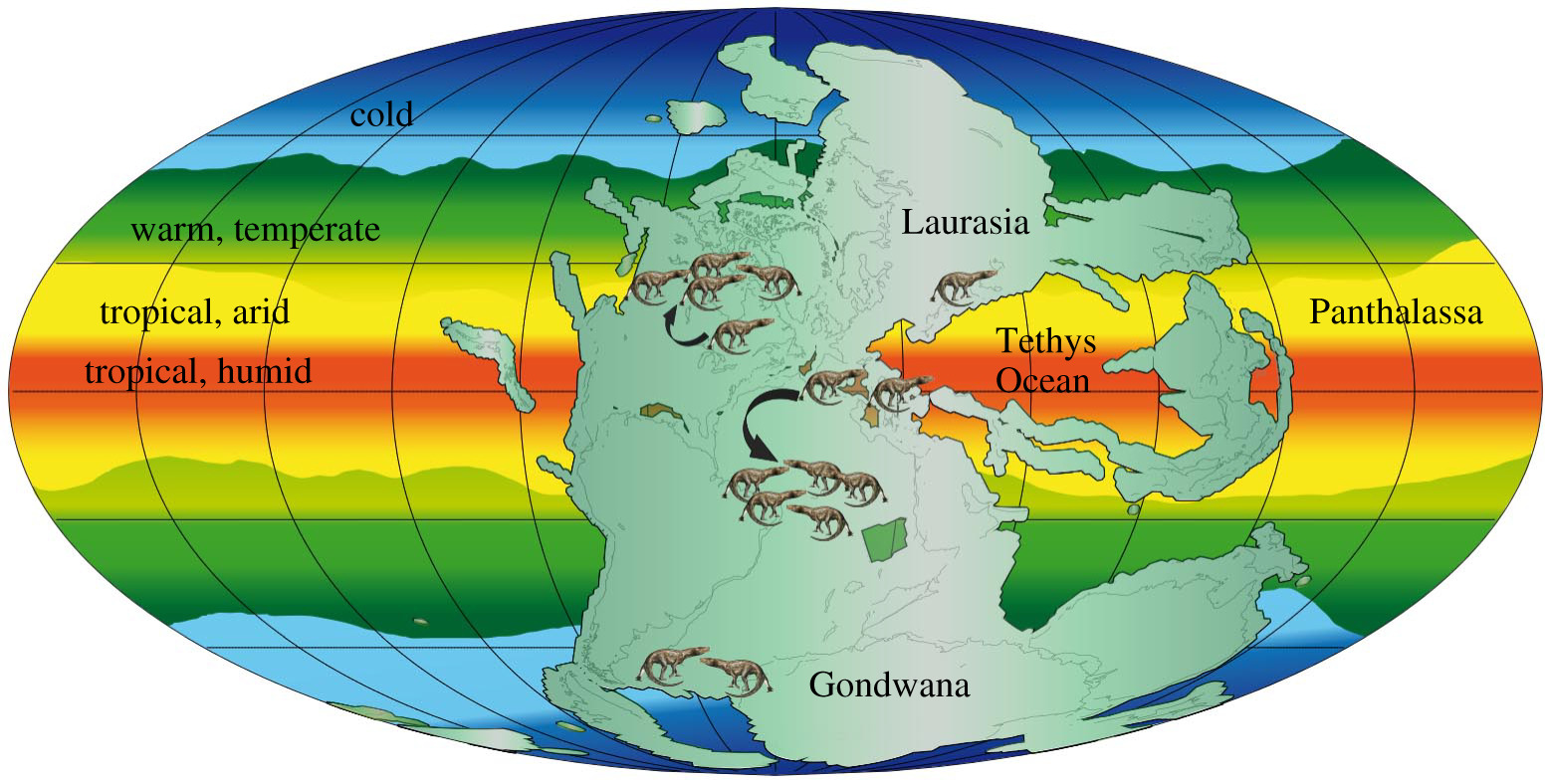
Map of the supercontinent Pangaea, showing the northern landmass Laurasia above, where Viatkogorgon and other Russian gorgonopsians lived

The following cladogram showing the position of Viatkogorgon within Gorgonopsia follows Macungo et al. (2026):

- Gorgonopsia
  - Nochnitsa
  - - Viatkogorgon
    - - "Russian clade"
        - Suchogorgon
        - - Sauroctonus
          - - Pravoslavlevia
            - Inostrancevia
      - "African clade"
        - - Eriphostoma
          - - Gorgonops
            - - Jirahgorgon
              - Phorcys
        - - Cynariops
          - - Lycaenops
            - - - Arctops
                - - DA21/17-01-01
                    (Port des Canonge Fm. gorgonopsian)
                  - Smilesaurus
              - - Arctognathus
                - Rubidgeinae

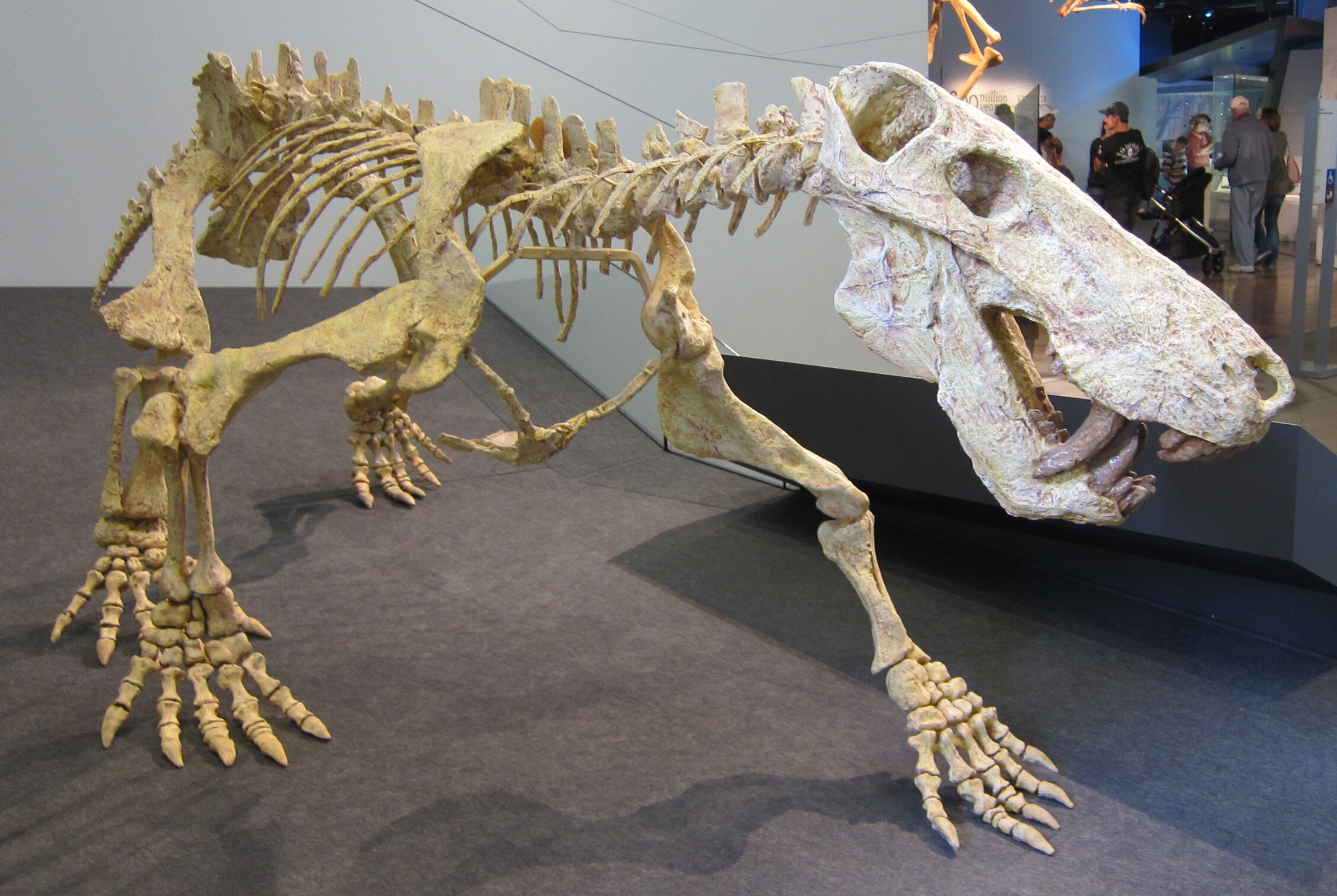
Reconstructed skeleton of the later-diverging and much larger Russian gorgonopsian Inostrancevia

In contrast, previous analyses had not found gorgonopsians to be grouped geographically, with some studies placing Russian genera such as Inostrancevia in African families. Kammerer and Masyutin found it surprising since there were many Russo-African sister taxon relationships between other therapsid groups, dicynodonts and burnetiamorphs in particular. This indicated there had been an extensive dispersal of coeval therapsid groups between continents. They cautioned that the paleobiogeography of tetrapod animals (ancestrally four-limbed vertebrates) during the Permian remained poorly understood, with the expected dispersal abilities of various therapsid groups often differing from what can be seen in the fossil record and suggested more research was needed.

Kammerer and Masyutin noted that while Viatkogorgon and Nochnitsa added to gorgonopsian diversity of the Kotelnich fauna, the group remained less rich in species than the therocephalians there. The low diversity and small size of the gorgonopsians there indicated that the assemblage of therapids was similar to that seen in the Pristerognathus Assemblage Zone in the Karoo Basin, South Africa, prior to the main round of gorgonopsian diversification there. In this regard, they found the basal position of Nochnitsa and Viatkogorgon intriguing, though they did not find it indicative of the Kotelnich locality being of an earlier age than the middle Permian South African strata that bear gorgonopsian fossils, based on the other kinds of therapid groups found among those faunas. They stated that while the "Russian clade" of gorgonopsians had probably diverged by the time the Kotelnich fauna existed, the absence of that clade in this locality suggests it had not yet undergone substantial diversification in Russia, and only became the dominant group of therapsid predators in the region later.

== Paleobiology ==
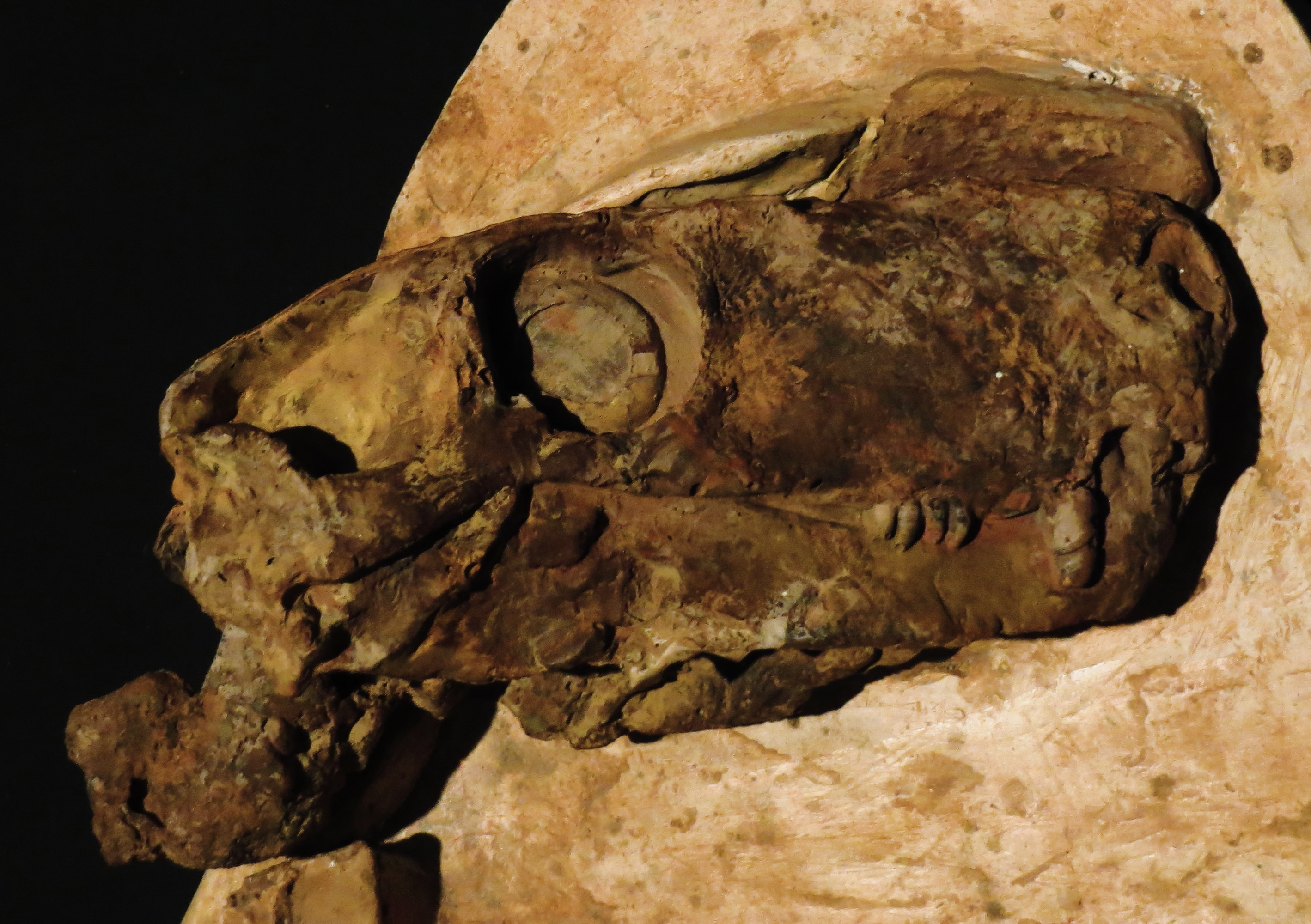
Cast of the holotype skull; note the large scleral ring in the eye socket, which may indicate nocturnal habits.

Tatarinov noted in 1999 that Viatkogorgon could have pressed food against the concave, smooth palatine areas between the palatal teeth with its tongue. Palatal teeth are thought to have helped early synapsids and other basal amniotes (ancestrally land-dwelling vertebrates) grip food; these were lost in mammals which developed secondary palates instead. In 2018, Kammerer and Masyutin considered the scleral ring of Viatkogorgon remarkably large in proportion to its large eye socket, falling well within what would be considered scotopic vision (ability to see in darkness) in therapsids, which suggests nocturnal habits. The Russian paleontologist Valeriy K. Golubev examined assemblages of Permian land vertebrates in Eastern Europe in 2000. He noted that Viatkogorgon and the therocephalian Viatkosuchus, the largest predators of the Kotelnich Subassemblage, were relatively small, not much different in size from the smaller predators of their assemblage, such as the therocephalians Scalopodon, Scalopodontes and Kotelcephalon. In 2019, the Russian paleontologists Yulia A. Suchkova and Golubev stated that the therocephalian Gorynychus from Kotelnich would have shared its niche as a dominant predator with Viatkogorgon.

The paleoartist and writer Mauricio Antón provided an overview of gorgonopsian biology in a 2013 book, writing that despite their differences from saber-toothed mammals, many features of their skeletons indicated they were not sluggish reptiles but active predators. While their brains were relatively smaller than those of mammals, and their sideways placed eyes provided limited stereoscopic vision, they had well-developed turbinals in their nasal cavity, a feature associated with an advanced sense of smell, which would have helped them track prey and carrion. The canine saber teeth were used for delivering the slashing killing-bite, while the incisors, which formed an arch in front of the saber teeth, held the prey and cut the flesh while feeding. To allow them to increase their gape when biting, gorgonopsians had several bones in their mandibles that could move in relation to each other and had a double articulation with the skull—unlike in mammals where the rear joint articular bone has become the malleus ear bone. Antón envisioned gorgonopsians would hunt by leaving their cover when prey was close enough, and use their relatively greater speed to pounce quickly on it, grab it with their forelimbs, and bite any part of the body that would fit in their jaws. Such a bite would cause a large loss of blood, but the predator would continue to try to bite vulnerable parts of the body.

=== Motion ===
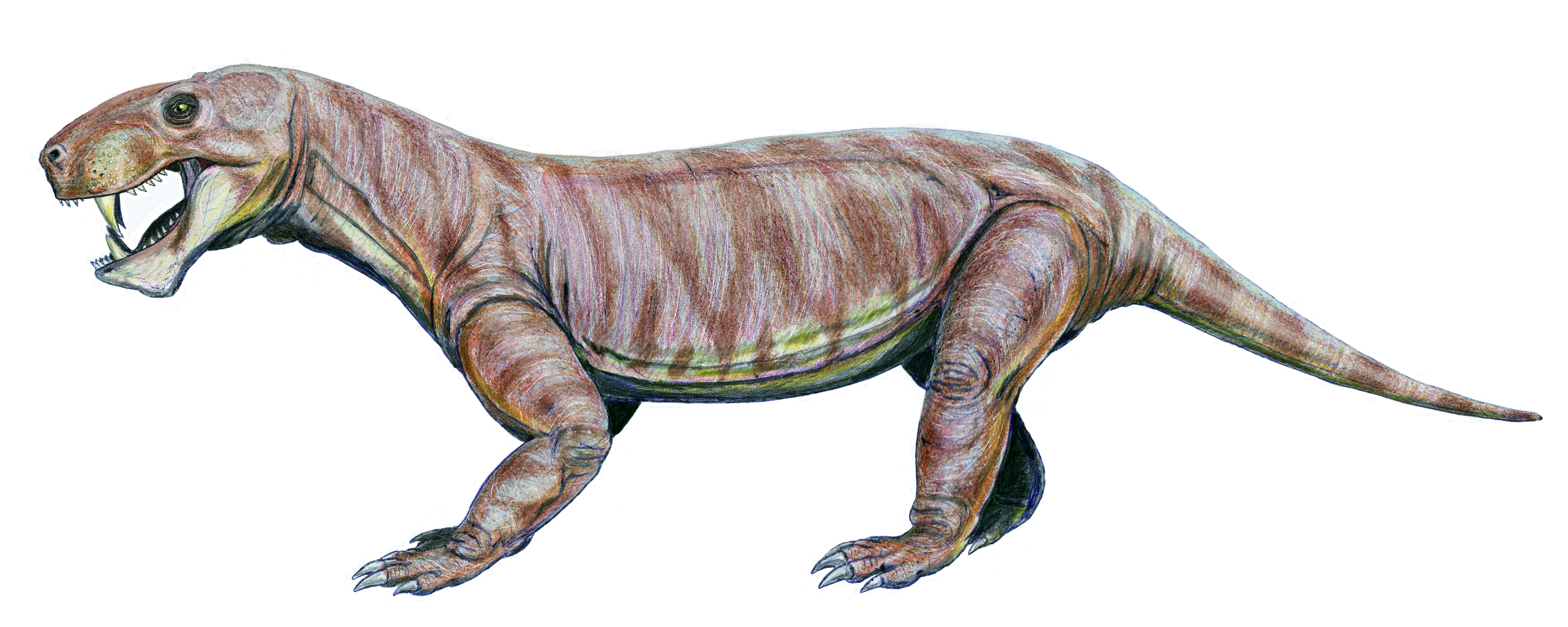
Restoration of Sauroctonus, showing the more upright stance of gorgonopsians compared to reptiles

In 2004, Tatarinov interpreted the behavior of Viatkogorgon based on its skeletal features, which, while being generally similar to those of other gorgonopsians, had certain features that are unique or poorly understood. These concerned features of the locomotor apparatus in particular, which indicated a stage of swimming adaptations, while other features were consistent with those commonly seen in its group. Like other gorgonopsians, it had a long lumbar region of the vertebrae, of which the hindmost vertebrae showed an increased capability for vertical curvature, which was also the case for the neck vertebrae and, unusually, the hind part of the tail region.

The presence of well-developed gastralia was one of its most unusual features among theriodonts, as were the hypapophyses of the tail region. In addition, the broad and somewhat shortened foot with unusual intermetatarsal contacts, which restricted the mobility of its individual digits, indicated transformation of the foot into a flipper-like structure. Tatarinov hypothesized these features to be adaptations for swimming; while Viatkogorgon was not a specialized aquatic predator, Tatarinov suggested its tail and feet enabled it to swim better than most other gorgonopsians. In particular, he thought the hind part of the tail was probably used for swimming, as is the case with reptiles with long tails that have hypapohyses, like Mosasaurus. Tatarinov noted that since the claw on the hindlimb's fifth digit was hooked and somewhat lengthened, it could have been used for protection and grooming, as in modern monotremes. The first digit could have had this function to a lesser degree, as it was free from contacting foot bones. The forelimb of Viatkogorgon was less specialized and could have performed more universal functions, as it lacked contacts between the digits.

Antón stated in 2013 that while the post-cranial skeletons of gorgonopsians were basically reptilian, their stance was far more upright than in more primitive synapsids, like pelycosaurs, which were more sprawling. Regular locomotion of gorgonopsians would have been similar to the "high walks" seen in crocodilians, wherein the belly is carried above the ground, with the feet pointing forwards, and the limbs carried under the trunk instead of to the sides. The forelimbs had a more horizontal posture than the hindlimbs, with the elbows pointing outwards during movement, but the gait of the hindlimbs would have resembled that of mammals. As in reptiles, the tail muscles (such as the caudofemoralis) were important in flexion of the hindlimb, whereas the tails of mammals are merely for balance. Their feet were probably plantigrade (where the soles were placed flat on the ground), though they were likely more swift and agile than their prey. Their feet were more symmetrical compared to the reptilian condition, making contact with the ground more efficient, similar to running mammals.

== Paleoenvironment ==
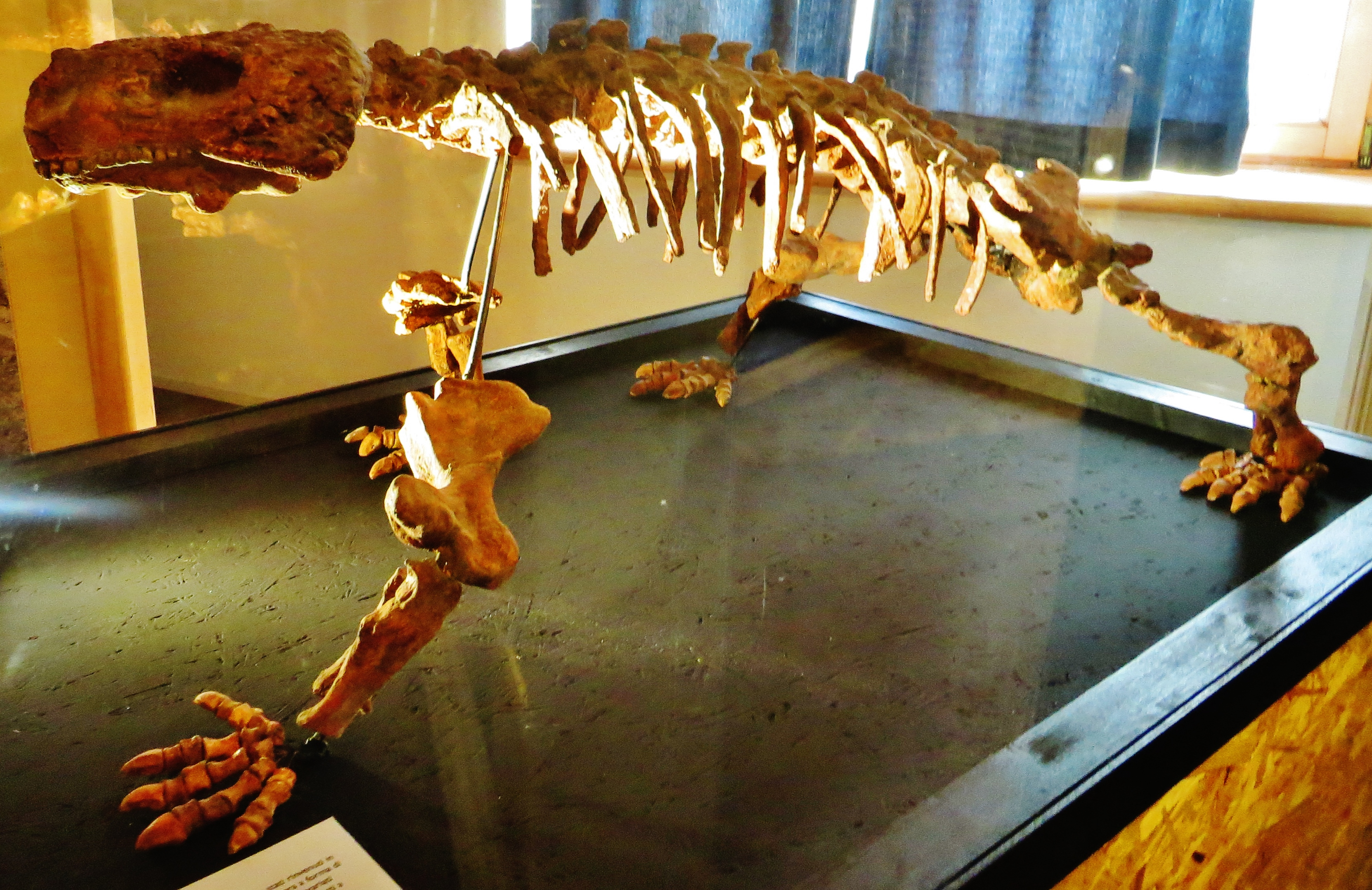
Skeleton of the pareiasaur Deltavjatia, which is very abundant at the Kotelnich locality

Viatkogorgon is known from the Kotelnich locality, which consists of a series of Permian red bed exposures along the banks of the Vyatka River in Russia. It is specifically from the Vanyushonki Member, which is the oldest rock unit in the Kotelnich succession, consisting of pale or brown mudstones (clay and silts, with some fine-grained sand) as well as gray mudstone, and dark red mudstone at the base of this exposure. These mudstones were possibly deposited from suspension in standing water bodies on floodplains or shallow ephemeral lakes, that remained flooded for short periods of time, but the exact environment has not yet been determined, due to the lack of a primary structure of the sediments. The abundance of fossil rootlets and large herbivores indicates the landscape represented by the Vanyushonki Member was relatively humid and well-vegetated. The Kotelnich faunal complex was possibly coeval (of the same age) with the Lycosuchus-Eunotosaurus Subzone (formerly known as the Pristerognathus Assemblage Zone) of South Africa, which dates to either the latest Capitanian of the Middle Permian to the earliest Wuchiapingian of the Late Permian, roughly 260-258 million years ago.

The Vanyushonki Member is the source of most of the tetrapod fossils from the Kotelnich locality, with skeletal remains being abundant here, often consisting of complete, articulated skeletons. Apart from the gorgonopsians Viatkogorgon and Nochnitsa, therapsids from the locality include the anomodont Suminia and the therocephalians Chlynovia, Gorynychus, Karenites, Perplexisaurus, Scalopodon, Scalopodontes, and Viatkosuchus. Parareptiles such as the pareiasaur Deltavjatia are particularly abundant there, and the nycteroleterid Emeroleter is present. Fossil ostracods, root traces, and tree stumps have also been found.

== Bibliography ==
- Antón, Mauricio (2013). Sabertooth. Bloomington: Indiana University Press. ISBN 978-0-253-01042-1. OCLC 857070029. Archived from the original on 31 July 2021.
