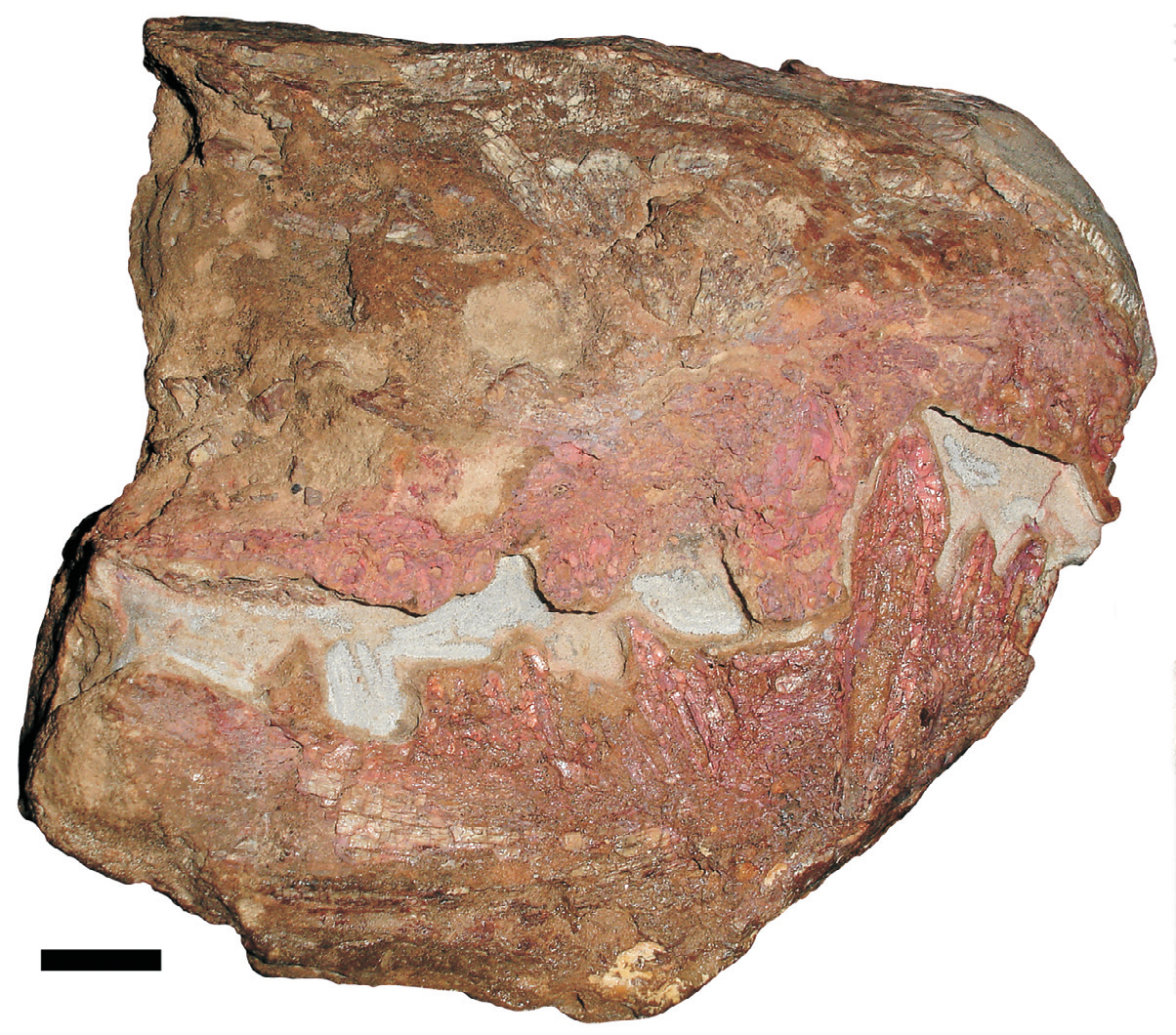
- Holotype snout

Scientific classification
- Kingdom: Animalia
- Phylum: Chordata
- Clade: Synapsida
- Clade: Therapsida
- Clade: †Therocephalia
- Family: †Scylacosauridae
- Genus: †Ictidosaurus; Broom, 1903

Type species
- †Ictidosaurus angusticeps Broom, 1903

= Ictidosaurus =

Ictidosaurus Temporal range: Middle Permian ~265–259 Ma

Genus of therapsid from the Middle Permian of South Africa

Ictidosaurus was a therapsid genus found in the Abrahamskraal Formation of South Africa, which lived during the middle Permian period. Fossils of the type species were found in the Tapinocephalus (Capitanian age, 265.8-260.4 Ma), and the base of the Eodicynodon (Wordian age, 268–265.8 Ma) assembly zones, of the Karoo Basin. Older classifications of the species, along with many other specimens found in the Iziko South African Museum archives, were originally classified within therocephalian family names, in this case the Ictidosauridae, which has been reclassified as belonging to the Scylacosauridae. The type species is I. angusticeps.

== Description ==
=== Type specimen ===
The holotype was of the Ictidosaurus angusticeps labeled SAM-PK-630 (NMQR 2910), found in the Tapinocephalus assembly zone. The skull measured 168 mm from snout to posterior of the left mandible, 41 mm across the skull in-between the canines, and 41 mm in height, and has been heavily disturbed by fracturing, reshaping of bone structures, and distortions, with the right side being the most well preserved of the skull. 16 to 17 teeth were identified on one side, and 10 on the other, with non being palatal. The upper dentition consists of six cylindrical incisors, one distal tip of a precanine, a large canine, and 18 lateral convex single cone postcanine (9 on each side), the first one of which is separated from the canine by diastema. Serrations on the teeth can be found on three of the incisors, on the posterior of the canine, and the anterior and posterior of the left side third postcanine tooth, which is in prosses of tooth eruption. The large number of postcanines is attributed to the length of the skull. The nasal process of the premaxilla reaches the level of the posterior borders of the nares. The species have many features in common with other early and more primitive Therocephalians, such as serated teeth, three lower incisors, a sloping mentum and lose symphysis, but it is set apart by its small marginal maxillary precanine, as well as the 6 upper incisors.

=== Known specimens ===
At present, there are only two collections with this fossil, located in South Africa. The specimens of these collections, holotype SAM-PK-630 (NMQR 2910) and SAM-PK-77957 (AMNH 5527), both have the anterior portions of their snouts and mandibles in occlusion, making cranial anatomy unknown. Despite this, the crania have been used for differentiating I. angusticeps from Glanosuchus macrops by I. angusticeps having precanines (confirmed by CAT-scan).

== Distribution ==
The specimens found would have lived during the Permian South Africa, some 265 to 259 Ma. The two specimens known are from a river delta plain and a terrestrial depositional environment, with the type locality being near Beaufort West (32.3° S, 22.6° E), Western Cape, South Africa. This locality was, during the Permian, positioned at what today is the Drake Passage (60.0° S, 34.1° W), in-between South America and Antarctica.
