= Viatkosuchus =

Viatkosuchus Temporal range: Wuchiapingian
- Restoration of Viatkosuchus sumini

Scientific classification
- Kingdom: Animalia
- Phylum: Chordata
- Clade: Synapsida
- Clade: Therapsida
- Clade: †Therocephalia
- Family: †Whaitsiidae
- Genus: †Viatkosuchus; Tatarinov, 1995

Type species
- Viatkosuchus sumini Tatarinov, 1995

Extinct genus of therapsids from the late Permian of Eurasia

Viatkosuchus is an extinct genus of therocephalians known from the Late Capitanian–Wuchiapingian Deltavjatia Assemblage Zone.

== See also ==
- List of therapsids
