= Parasilvia =

Parasilvia Temporal range: Late Permian (Wuchiapingian?)

Scientific classification
- Kingdom: Animalia
- Phylum: Chordata
- Clade: Synapsida
- Clade: Therapsida
- Clade: †Anomodontia
- Genus: †Parasilvia; Bulanov et al., 2026
- Species: †P. alexandrae

Binomial name
- †Parasilvia alexandrae Bulanov et al., 2026

Genus of extinct therapsid

Parasilvia ("near forest") is a genus of anomodont therapsid (extinct mammal-line synapsid related to dicynodonts) known from rocks assigned to the Late Permian aged Chroniosaurus levis Tetrapod Zone (Podlesnyi locality) in Orenburg, Russia. The genus contains the type and only species, Parasilvia alexandrae, known from various fragmentary and disarticulated bones of the skull and jaw.

Parasilvia closely resembles other Russian anomodonts, namely Suminia and Parasuminia, and the three were classified as 'dromasaurs' together in their own family by its describers with the South African Galechirus in Galechiridae. Parasilvia appears relatively primitive (basal) compared to Suminia and Parasuminia, in some ways more closely resembling Galechirus and other Russian anomodonts (e.g. Venyukovia and Ulemica, i.e. Venyukovioidea). In phylogenetic systematics, all the other Russian anomodonts are conventionally classified together under Venyukovioidea while 'dromasaurs' are regarded as an artificial grouping (polyphyletic) of unrelated South African taxa (including Galechirus). This reflects the different approaches to anomodont taxonomy. Regardless, Parasilvia is the youngest known early anomodont from Russia, despite being considered relatively primitive compared to its older close relatives.

== History of discovery ==
Fossils of Parasilvia were first discovered in 2024 in a quarry on the northeast outskirts of the village of Podlesnyi in the Grachevsky District of Orenburg, Russia. The fossil locality in the quarry was newly discovered that year by F. F. Shaymardanov and M. L. Papernyi, and the first anomodont fossils from the quarry (teeth and a lower jaw) were reported at conferences in 2024 by Shaymardanov and Papernyi with V. V. Bulanov. Subsequent excavations in 2025 by the Borissiak Paleontological Institute of the Russian Academy of Sciences (PIN RAS) and the Samara Paleontological Society discovered additional partial remains of the snout and palate, which together were enough to identify the Podlesnyi anomodont as a new taxon.

The fossils of Parasilvia alexendrae were described and named as a new genus and species by Bulanov, Shaymardanov and Papernyi in 2026. Bulanov and colleagues described the etymology of the genus name as being derived from Latin and as a combination of para (to mean "beside") and silva ("forest"), which itself comes from a near-literal translation of "Podlesnyi". The species name P. alexandrae is named after Alexandra Papernaya, the wife of M . L. Papernaya. The holotype specimen of Parasilvia (PIN, no. 5936/5) is a skull fragment comprising most of the right maxilla (the largest upper jaw bone) with fragmentary portions of the attached jugal and lacrimal bones, as well as portions of the right palatal bones (palatine, pterygoid and ectopterygoid). Additional specimens include an isolated left premaxilla (PIN, no. 5936/4) and a partial lower jaw (PIN, no. 5936/1), as well as several isolated teeth. These fossils were CT-scanned at PIN RAS and reconstructed digitally in 3D.

The Podlesnyi locality has not been dated absolutely, but biostratigraphic correlations imply it belongs to the Chroniosaurus levis Tetrapod Zone (a biozone) of Russian regional stratigraphy), and potentially directly correlative to the better studied Mutovino locality of the Kichuga Member in the Poldarsa Formation. This locality is roughly dated to the end of the Severodvinian stage in regional stratigraphy. This stage corresponds to the end of the Capitanian and into the early Wuchiapingian on the global International Stratigraphic Scale of the Middle and Late Permian respectively, and so correlation with Mutovino suggests the Podlesnyi locality dates to the Wuchiapingian, no more than 259.857 million years ago (Ma). The fossiliferous rocks of the quarry consist of layers of fine-grained sandstone approximately 8.5 metres (28 ft) thick representing fluvial deposits, interbedded with pebbles and gravels.

== Description ==
Parasilvia is only known by the incomplete remains of its lower jaw and portions of the snout of the skull, but these portions broadly resemble its relatives Suminia and Parasuminia—though it is less specialised than these forms and also resembles the South African anomodont Galechirus. Parasilvia is larger than Suminia and Parasuminia, with an estimated skull length of 8 centimetres (3.1 in) compared to the largest 6.5 centimetres (2.6 in) estimated skull in Suminia, and intermediate in size between the latter and other Russian anomodonts (e.g. Ulemica, Otsheria, 9–12 centimetres (3.5–4.7 in)).

There are 12 teeth in each row of the upper jaw, five in the premaxilla and seven in the maxilla. The first two teeth in each premaxilla are enlarged, forward projecting (procumbent) and incisiform (incisor-like), while the remaining teeth form the "buccal series" (i.e. cheek teeth). The large incisiform teeth are similar in size to those of Suminia, but relatively larger than those of Parasuminia. The buccal teeth are uniformly smaller and similar in size to each other, but gradually decrease in size towards the back of the mouth. The buccal teeth are angled such that the tooth in front overlaps the front edge of the tooth behind from the side. A similar arrangement is seen in the dentary teeth, although there is only one incisiform tooth at the tip of each dentary and the buccal teeth minimally overlap. All the teeth are roughly leaf-shaped and initially serrated with cusps and cingula rimming the crowns, but are readily worn and abraded away.

The dentaries themselves are robust with a tall, thick and steep fused mandibular symphysis at their tip that protrudes below the mandibles. Each dentary is thickened below the toothrow, especially so below the "buccal series" where it is broadened outwards into a shelf. This is in part due to the placement of tooth row much more inwardly on the mandibles compared with Suminia. Each mandible contains at least eight teeth, as preserved in the left mandible.

Although the maxilla is incomplete, enough is preserved to indicate that it arches upwards behind the teeth to form the base of the zygomatic arch. This portion arches up relatively strongly at an angle of round 40° to the jaw margin, steeper than most other Russian anomodonts except the holotype of Suminia. The adjacent portion of the jugal contributes to the arch and also rims the bottom of the orbit opening for the eye. On the inside surfaces, the palatine, ectopterygoid and pterygoid bones contribute to the palate. The palatine bone is relatively short and borders the outer rear end of the internal nostrils (choanae)—like Ulemica and Otsheria but unlike the long palatines of Suminia (where the rear rim of the choanae is made entirely of the vomer). Another difference from Suminia is the position of the lateral palatal foramen (an opening for nerves and blood vessels in the palate), which is bordered almost entirely by the ectoptergoid except for the palatine on its inner border, while it is further back and also bordered by the pterygoid in Suminia. The pterygoid descends down and back from the rest of the palate at a sharp 40 angle, comparable to Ulemica and Otsheria.

== Classification ==
Parasilvia was described by Bulanov and colleagues in 2026 as a 'dromasaur', a taxonomic group originally coined by Robert Broom in 1907 for the small South African anomodont Galechirus. They further placed it in Galechiridae, one of two taxonomic families of 'dromasaurs' originally coined by Broom to contain Galechirus and Galepus (the other, Galeopidae, only included Galeops). They regarded Parasilvia to be closely related to the Russian anomodonts Suminia and Parasuminia, and classified the three genera together with the South African Galechirus under Galechiridae.

'Dromasauria' as traditionally understood, however, is not a recognised group in modern cladistics-based phylogenetic taxonomy, as they do not correspond to a clade (natural group) in most phylogenetic analyses. Instead 'dromasaurs' appear to be a polyphyletic grouping of early anomodonts that are not exclusively closely related to one another. As such, 'Dromasauria' and Galechiridae have largely fallen out of use in modern phylogenetic taxonomy. Likewise, Suminia is conventionally phylogenetically found as close relative of other small Russian anomodonts in the clade Venyukovioidea, unrelated to any traditional 'dromasaurs'.

However, Bulanov and colleagues instead follow an alternative taxonomic classification of anomodonts (and other synapsids) proposed by Russian palaeontologist Mikhail Ivakhnenko. Under Ivakhnenko's taxonomy, 'Dromasauria' (originally "Dromasaurida") was expanded to include Broom's original 'dromasaurs', Suminia (and later Parasuminia) under the family Galeopidae, as well as a second family, Anomocephalidae (i.e. Anomocephaloidea). Suminia and Parasuminia were thus also considered to be unrelated to typical venyukovioids (i.e. Venyukovia, Otsheria and Ulemica), themselves classified as the separate order Ulemicia. Bulanov and colleagues modified Ivakhnenko's taxonomy by arguing that most "galeopids" were both so distinct from Galeops but so similar to each other to warrant separating into their own family, for which Galechiridae is available. Bulanov's Galechiridae thus includes Galechirus, Suminia, Parasuminia and the newly named Parasilvia. (Note: Bulanov maintained the separation of Venyukovia, Otsheria and Ulemica ('ulemicians') from Suminia and Parasuminia, but retained the name Venyukovioidea for this group.)

Bulanov and colleagues did not perform a phylogenetic analysis of Parasilvia to examine its evolutionary relationships, but from its morphology they argued that it was relatively primitive compared to Suminia and Parasuminia. Parasilvia appears to share some derived traits of these taxa while also resembling the relatively more basal Galechirus and indeed 'ulemician' venyukovioids. Such features are primarily found in the palate and the teeth. Despite this, Parasilvia was found in stratigraphically higher rocks than Suminia and Parasuminia and so is younger than them, potentially the youngest of all Russian non-dicynodont anomodonts.

== Palaeobiology ==
Parasilvia is inferred to be a herbivore like the related Suminia and Parasuminia, as it has very similar teeth suited for shearing vegetation. Extensive wear on the teeth indicate that its upper and lower teeth strongly occluded against each other during chewing to cut vegetation. What's more, although the jaw joint is unknown, the orientation and length of the wear marks (sometimes crossing onto adjacent teeth) imply Parasilvia was capable of extensive back-and-forth motion of the lower jaw and so likely had an elongated jaw joint similar to Suminia. The same anatomy is also found in dicynodonts, and both they and Suminia chewed their food with a powerful palinal (backward) jaw stroke to shear vegetation.

== Palaeoecology ==
In additional to Parasilvia, the fossil site near Podlesnyi has also preserved the fragmentary remains of the aquatic temnospondyl amphibian Dvinosaurus, indeterminate pareiasaurs (herbivorous parareptiles) and predatory therapsids, and Chroniosaurus levis and Microphon, a chroniosuchid and seymouriamorph (early tetrapods, if not amniotes), respectively. Fossils of unidentified scales of fish, plant material, and impressions bivalves have also been discovered at the site.
