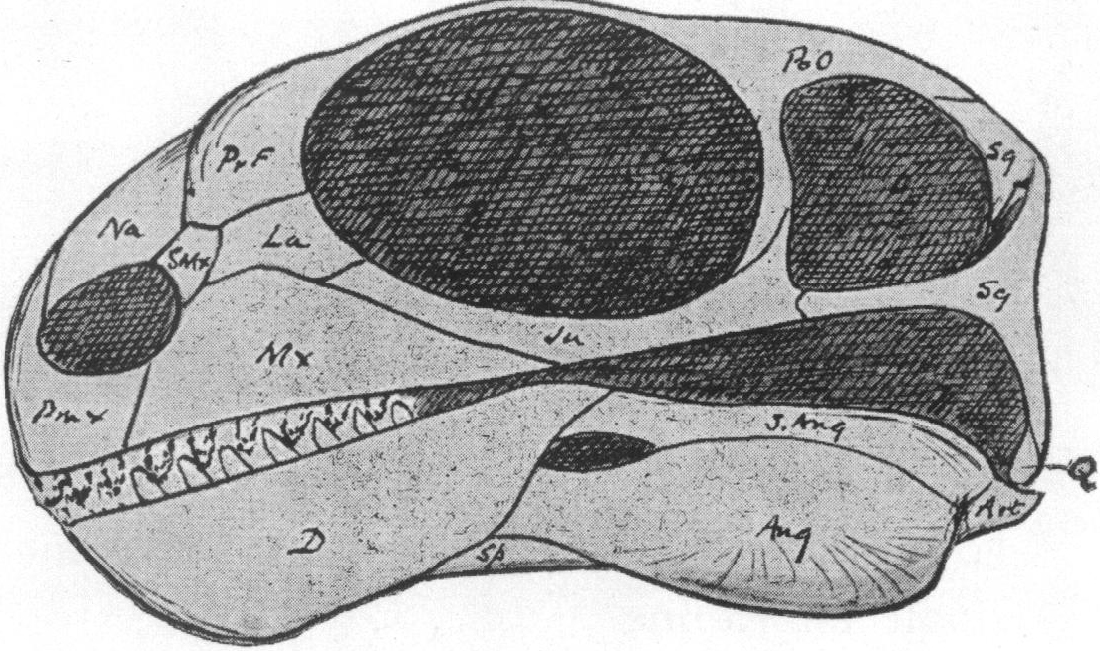
- Skull of Galepus, a 'dromasaur'
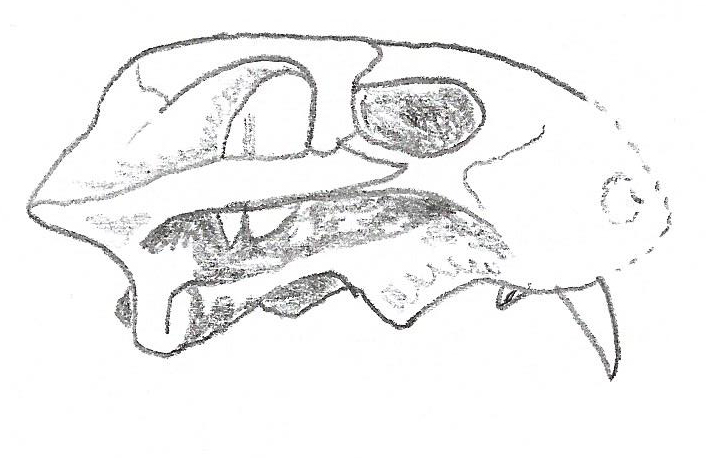
- Skull of Eodicynodon, a dicynodont

Scientific classification
- Kingdom: Animalia
- Phylum: Chordata
- Clade: Synapsida
- Clade: Therapsida
- Clade: †Anomodontia
- Clade: †Chainosauria; Nopsca, 1923

Subtaxa
- †Galechirus; †Galeops; †Galepus; †Patranomodon?; †Anomocephaloidea?; †Dicynodontia

= Chainosauria =

Chainosauria Temporal range: Middle Permian – Late Triassic

Extinct clade of therapsids

Chainosauria is a large and speciose clade of anomodont therapsid that includes the highly diverse dicynodonts and a small number of closely related basal genera (to the exclusion of Venyukovioidea and more basal anomodonts)—although the total composition and taxonomic scope of Chainosauria is in flux. Chainosauria was named in 1923 to group together the dicynodonts and their close relatives, namely three small anomodont genera from South Africa (Galechirus, Galeops, and Galepus) that made up the now defunct group 'Dromasauria'. The name soon fell into disuse, however, as it was functionally replaced by Anomodontia. Chainosauria was later revived cladistically in 2009, preserving the association of dicynodonts and the 'dromasaurs' and has since served in effect as both a cladistic and a biogeographic counterpart to the Laurasian venyukovioids, with early chainosaurs appearing to have been a Gondwanan radiation.

Other basal anomodonts, the anomocephaloids and Patranomodon, have also sometimes been recovered as chainosaurs, and so the contents and relationships of early chainosaurs are not resolved. As such, autapomorphies (unique defining traits) that unite chainosaurs are difficult to determine with certainty. Early chainosaurs are much more lightly built and slender than dicynodonts. However, in general their skulls are proportionally more dicynodont-like than more basal anomodonts. Furthermore, while the first chainosaurs lacked the characteristic tusks and beaks of dicynodonts and had complete rows of teeth, the sliding jaw-joint and jaw musculature of dicynodonts had first evolved in earlier chainosaurs (namely the dicynodont-adjacent genus Galeops), and their teeth were simplified and reduced (apart from anomocephaloids).

== History of study ==
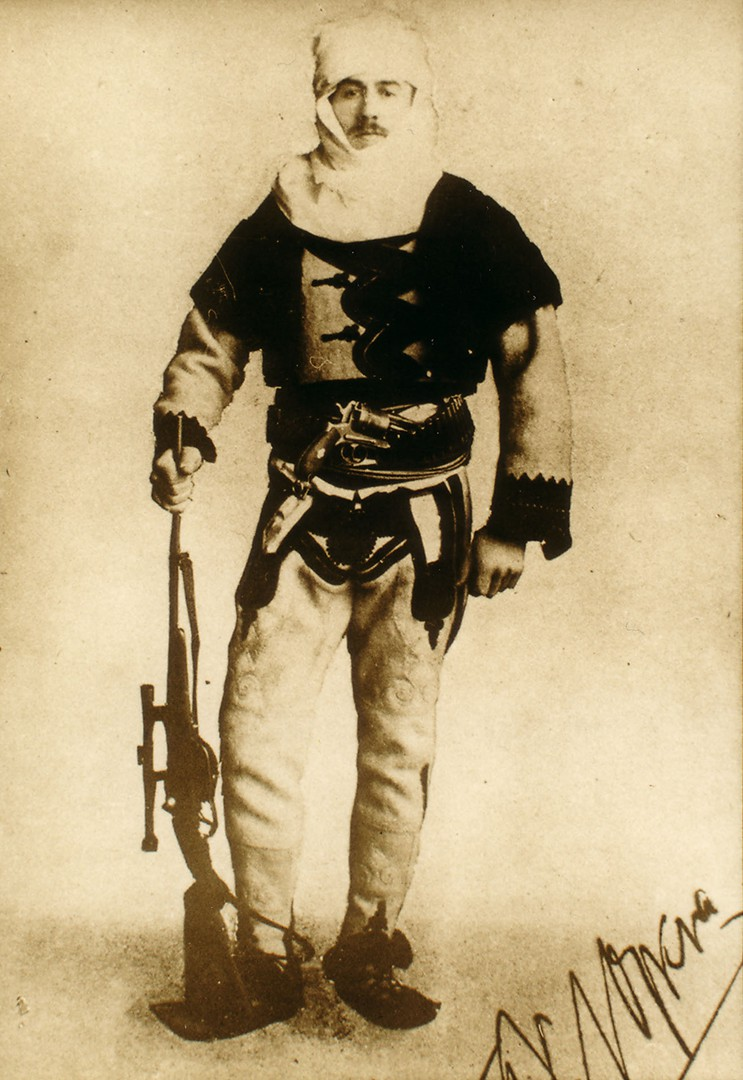
Baron Nopcsa, in Albanian Uniform, 1915, who coined Chainosauria in 1923.

Chainosauria was coined by Hungarian palaeontologist Baron Franz Nopcsa in 1923 as an order of Theromorpha (a group roughly equivalent to modern Therapsida, also including Theriodontia and Dinocephalia) to unite and contain the dicynodonts and the 'dromasaurs'. Nopcsa derived the name Chainosauria from the Ancient Greek word "χαίνειν" with the intended translation of "to snap" referring to the snapping beak-bites of derived forms (i.e. dicynodonts). Nopcsa also originally included the unrelated sphenacodont Palaeohatteria in Chainosauria, placing it in the 'Dromasauria' as its own family Palaeohatteriidae, while other 'dromasaurs' formed the Dromasauridae (which at the time also included the therocephalian Macroscelesaurus). In 1928, Nopcsa removed Palaeohatteriidae from Dromasauria (as "Dromasauroidea"), but his concept for Chainosauria otherwise remained the same.

Nopcsa's intent for Chainosauria to encompass dicynodonts and their close relatives was functionally similar to the modern usage of Anomodontia, which was itself used at the time equivalently to what we recognise as Dicynodontia today. As such, the subsequent redefinition and expansion of Anomodontia by other researchers to encompass dicynodonts and their relatives made Nopcsa's Chainosauria redundant, and so the name fell into disuse for the rest of the 20th century. Chainosauria was quickly criticised by American palaeontologist Alfred Romer in 1923, regarding Nopcsa's choice to group dicynodonts and 'dromasaurs' together as being "on not very obvious grounds". However, a genuine phylogenetic relationship between the 'dromasaurs' and dicynodonts has since been upheld. Furthermore, as more basal anomodonts were discovered and new cladistic methods of determining phylogenetic relationships were developed, a close association between the 'dromasaurs' and dicynodonts exclusive of other anomodonts has also been recognised.

This led palaeontologists Christian F. Kammerer and Kenneth D. Angielczyk to resurrect the name in 2009 for this phylogenetic group. They cladistically re-defined Chainosauria as the clade of all anomodonts closer to Dicynodon and Galeops than to Venyukovia, in effect defining Chainosauria to act as a counterpart to the Russian anomodont clade Venyukovioidea. As conceived by Kammerer and Angielczyk, Chainosauria also excluded the basal South African anomodonts Anomocephalus and Patranomodon. However, recent phylogenetic analyses have variably recovered Patranomodon as well as the anomocephaloids as closer to dicynodonts than venyukovioids and thus as chainosaurs by definition.

== Morphology ==
The majority of chainosaur diversity is found in the dicynodonts, which span a broad range of body sizes but are conservative in form, typically with barrel-shaped bodies, stocky limbs and short tails. By contrast, earlier chainosaurs where much more lightly build and gracile, with elongated and slender limb bones. Long tails are also known in at least Galepus and Galechirus, which each having at least approximately 30 caudal vertebrae that were longer than wide (unlike the short and broad caudals of dicynodonts, but similar to those of the venyukovioid Suminia).

Early chainosaurs had also not yet evolved the reduced post-canine dentition, beaks and tusks of dicynodonts, and instead possessed complete rows of teeth lacking differentiated canines (with the potential exception of the anomocephaloid Tiarajudens). The dentition of definitive early chainosaurs (i.e. 'dromasaurs'), as well as Patranomodon, is made up of simplified, peg-like teeth. A possible exception are the anomocephaloids, which possess leaf-shaped incisiforms and molar-like palatal teeth (as well as sabre-like caniniforms in Tiarajudens), should they indeed be chainosaurs. Notably, though, the characteristic elongated lower jaw joint of dicynodonts and associated novel jaw musculature (the external lateral adductor) that allows the mandible to slide back and process food is first found outside Dicynodontia in Galeops. An incipient beak at the tips of the jaws has sometimes been proposed for Galeops and Galepus, but this is likely an artefact of poor preservation.

Internally, the nasopalatine nerve inside the maxilla is already large and well-developed in Patranomodon. This nerve is a branch of the trigeminal nerve, and is associated with the innervation of the keratinous beak in dicynodonts (similar to turtles), and its enlargement in Patranomodon may indicate that greater sensitivity in the premaxilla may have preceded the development of beaks in early chainosaurs.

== Classification ==
=== Phylogeny ===
Although intended to be defined as including dicynodonts and 'dromasaurs', the 'dromasaurs' themselves are a paraphyletic series (or grade) or even a polyphyletic collection of early chainosaurs outside dicynodonts. As a stem- or branch-based clade, Chainosauria includes all anomodonts more closely related to Dicynodon (representing dicynodonts) and Galeops (representing 'dromasaurs') than to Venyukovia, and is defined so that the group is always the sister clade of Venyukovioidea (and vice versa). This means that Chainosauria also includes other anomodonts not regarded as dicynodonts or 'dromasaurs' as long as they are found to be closer to them than to venyukovioids.

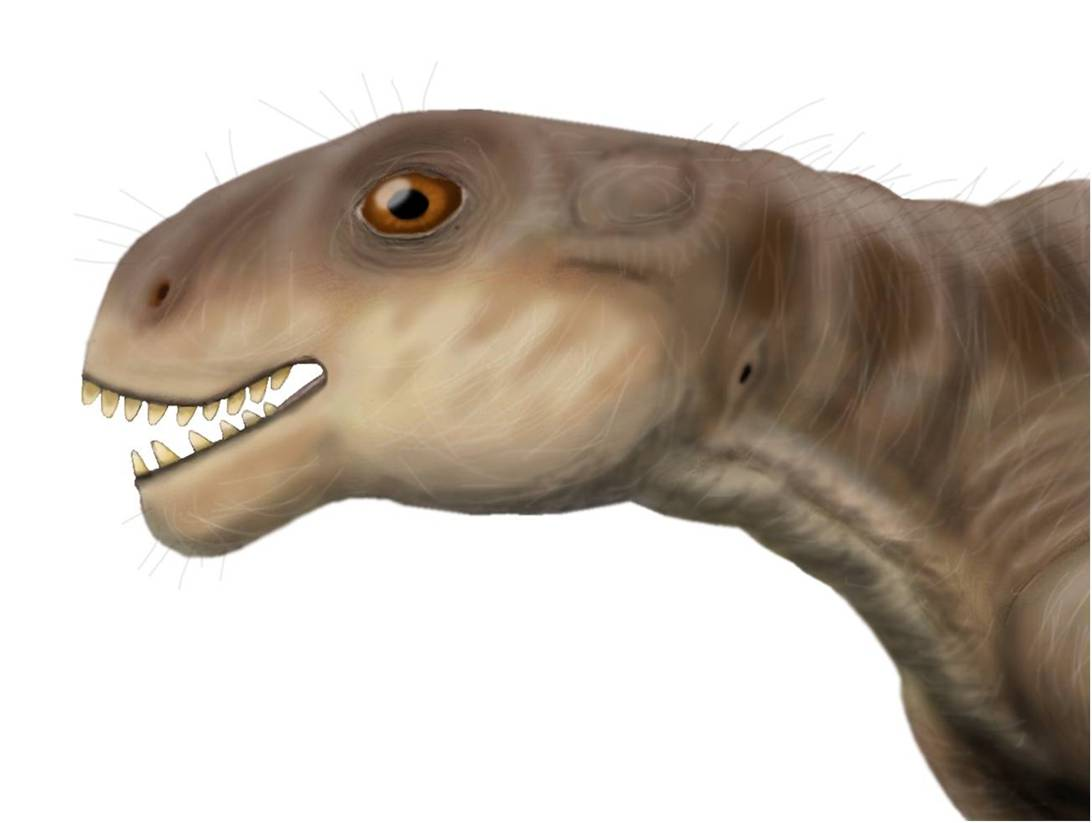
Life restoration of Patranomodon nyaphulii, a possible chainosaur.

Due to the unstable relationships of basal anomodonts, this has led to varying compositions for Chainosauria. The basal anomodont Patranomodon has been particularly unstable in this regard. It was at first thought to be the basalmost anomodont upon discovery, an interpretation supported by early phylogenetic analyses. However, multiple more recent analyses from 2009 onwards have instead found it as a chainosaur nestled amongst various 'dromasaurs'. Likewise, Anomocephalus was thought to be a basal anomodont outside the Chainosauria + Venyukovioidea clade, but following an analysis in 2017 it and its close relative Tiarajudens (i.e. Anomocephaloidea) have been recovered as a basal chainosaur as well.

The inclusion of both Patranomodon and anomocephaloids in Chainosauria has been described by Angielczyk and Kammerer (2017) as "intuitively pleasing". Both taxa have similar deep and short skull proportions to other chainosaurs, and many of their supposed basal features could alternatively be interpreted as plesiomorphies—i.e. shared ancestral traits inherited from the common ancestor of chainosaurs and other anomodonts. At the same time, derived traits shared between derived chainosaurs and venyukovioids (namely those of the jaw joint and jaw musculature) are likely convergent.

The relationships of the various 'dromasaurs' are similarly unsettled. Galeops is consistently recognised as the sister taxon of Dicynodontia, but Galepus and Galechirus have been found in varying positions. Initially they were recovered as closely related to Galeops and dicynodonts, such as by Kammerer et al. (2011), and sometimes forming a clade together (Galechiridae). However, in later analyses Galechirus tended to fall outside Chainosauria altogether in a polytomy with it and Venyukovioidea (such as in the left cladogram below). Furthermore, the analysis led by Angielczyk and Kammerer (2017) with an expanded Chainosauria, Galechirus returned to a position close to Galeops, while Galepus was instead found as the most basal chainosaur.

Examples of these varying relationships are shown in the two cladograms below:

Cisneros et al. (2015): Restricted Chainosauria

- Anomodontia
  - Biseridens
  - - Anomocephaloidea
      - Tiarajudens
      - Anomocephalus
    - - Galechirus
      - Venyukovioidea
        - Otsheria
        - - Suminia
          - Ulemica
      - Chainosauria
        - Patranomodon
        - - Galeops
          - Dicynodontia

Angielczyk and Kammerer (2017): Expanded Chainosauria

- Anomodontia
  - Biseridens
  - - Venyukovioidea
      - Suminia
      - - Otsheria
        - Ulemica
    - Chainosauria
      - Galepus
      - - Anomocephaloidea
          - Tiarajudens
          - Anomocephalus
        - - Patranomodon
          - - Galechirus
            - - Galeops
              - Dicynodontia

=== Biogeography ===
The composition of Chainosauria has implications for the origins, evolutionary history and biogeography of early anomodonts. An early biogeographic split amongst basal anomodonts has been proposed by researchers between Chainosauria and Venyukovioidea, with Chainosauria radiating in Gondwana in the southern hemisphere and venyukovioids as a Laurasian radiation in the northern hemisphere. Patranamodon and Anomocephalus, having each been considered the most basal anomodont at times, have been used to argue a Gondwanan origin for both chainosaurs and venyukovioids. The recognition of the Chinese taxon Biseridens as the basal-most known anomodont alternatively supports a Laurasian origin of anomodonts, from where chainosaurs would have migrated out of and only later radiated in Gondwana.
