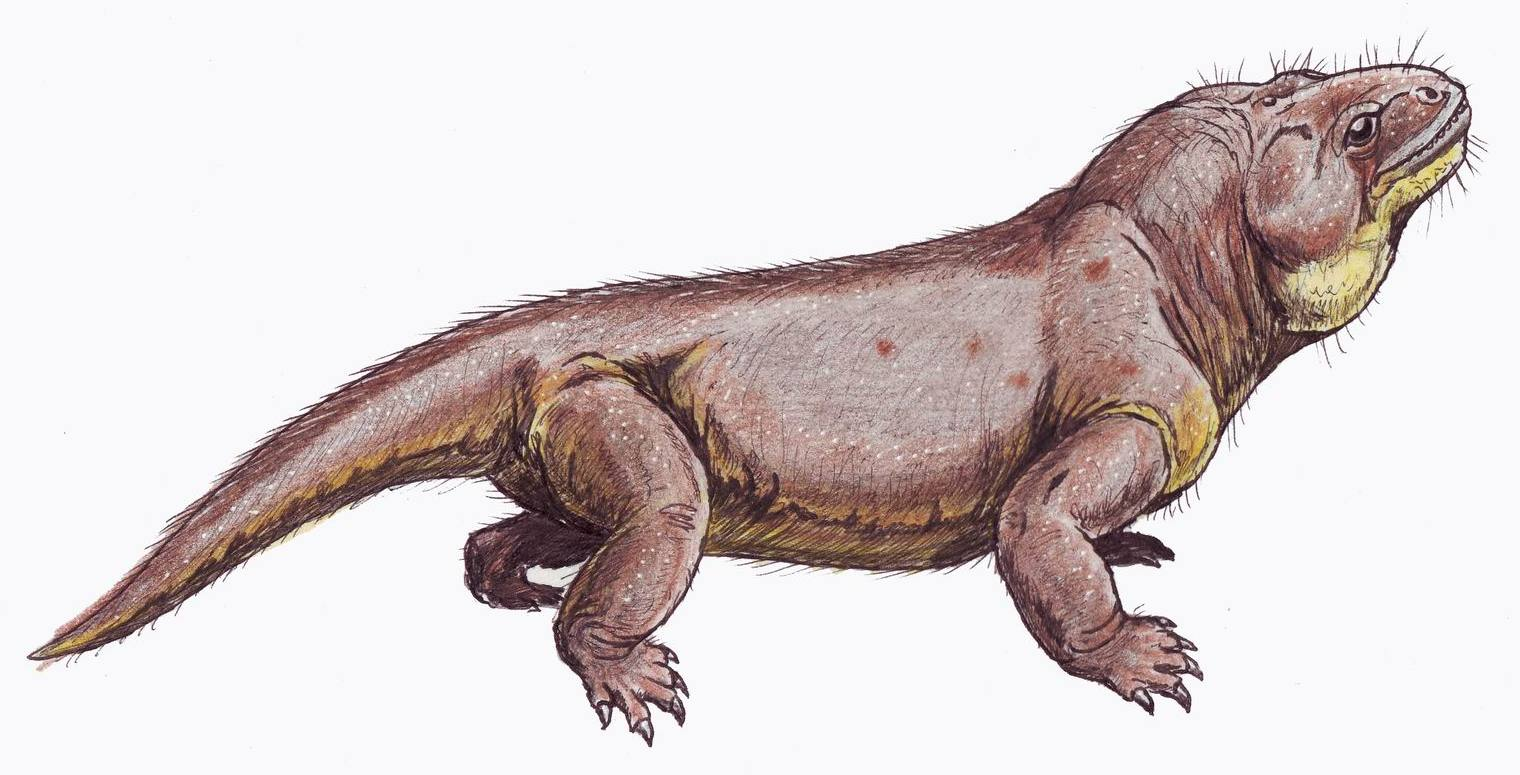
- Life restoration of Venyukovia prima

Scientific classification
- Kingdom: Animalia
- Phylum: Chordata
- Clade: Synapsida
- Clade: Therapsida
- Clade: †Anomodontia
- Infraorder: †Venyukovioidea; Watson and Romer, 1956

Genera
- †Otsheria; †Parasuminia; †Suminia; †Ulemica; †Venyukovia

= Venyukovioidea =

Venyukovioidea Temporal range: Middle - Late Permian, 267–260 Ma

Extinct infraorder of therapsids

Venyukovioidea is an infraorder of anomodont therapsids related to dicynodonts from the Permian of Russia. They have also been known as 'Venjukovioidea', as well as by the similar names 'Venyukoviamorpha' or 'Venjukoviamorpha' in literature. This in part owes to a misspelling by Russian palaeontologist Ivan Efremov in 1940 when he mistakenly spelt Venyukovia, the namesake of the group, with a 'j' instead of a 'y' (i.e. 'Venjukovia'), which permeated through subsequent therapsid literature before the mistake was caught and corrected. The order Ulemicia has also been coined for a similar taxonomic concept in Russian scientific literature, which notably excludes Suminia and Parasuminia.

Venyukovioidea includes the genera Venyukovia, Otsheria, Ulemica, Suminia and Parasuminia, all from Western Siberia. Historically, some of these genera have been placed in various families and subfamilies, including the Venyukoviidae/'Venjukoviidae', Otsheriidae, and Ulemiciidae. However, the internal lower-level relationships of the venyukovioids have not been fully resolved and so the utility and composition of these individual subgroups is unclear. Furthermore, although the group uses the '–oidea' suffix typical of superfamilies in Linnean taxonomy, it was originally coined as an infraorder by D. M. S. Watson and Alfred Romer in 1956. Venyukovioidea was later cladistically defined by palaeontologists Christian F. Kammerer and Kenneth D. Angielczyk in 2009 as all anomodonts closer to Venyukovia than to Galeops or Dicynodon, distinguishing its contents from other anomodonts regarded as either 'dromasaurs' or dicynodonts.

== Description ==
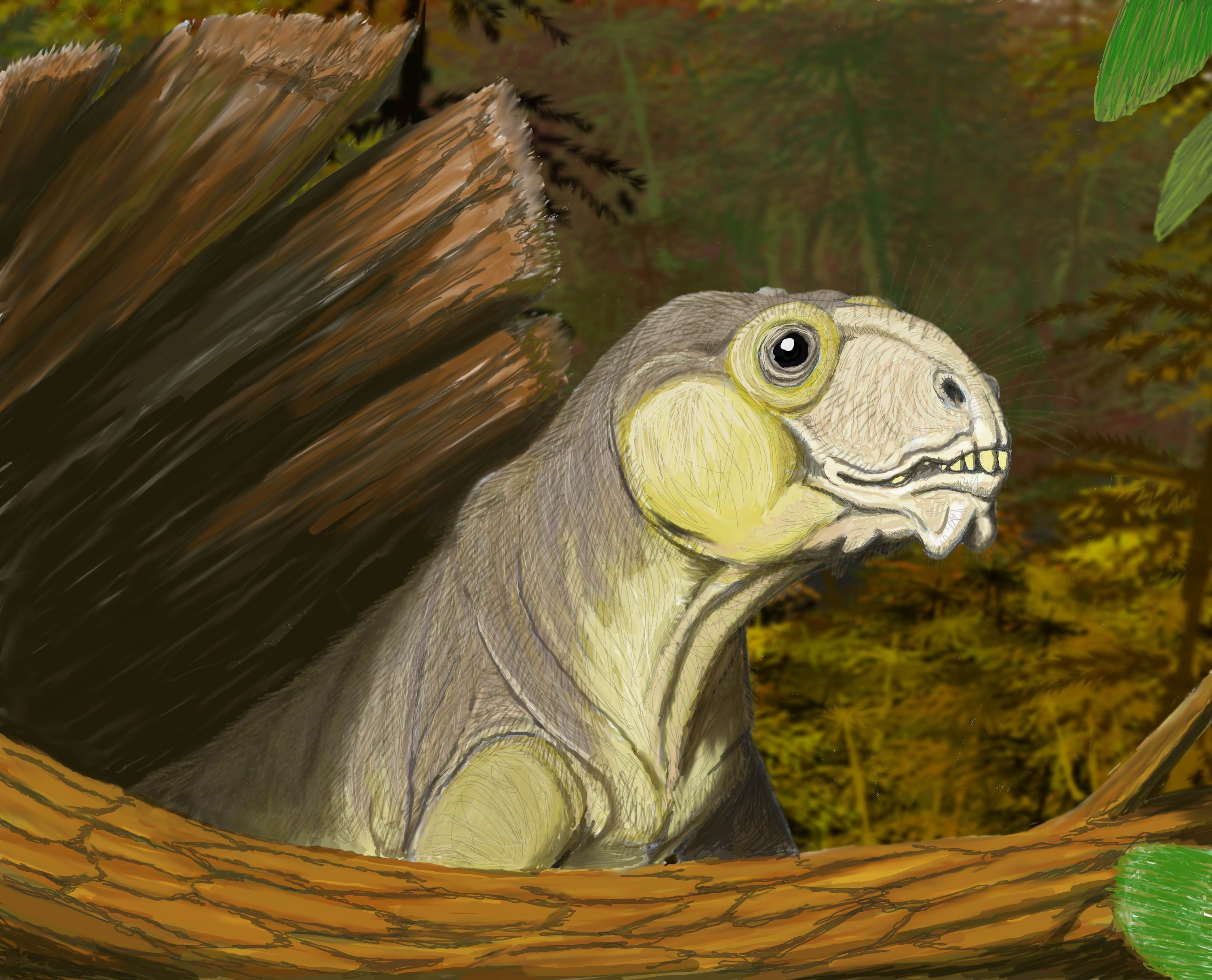
Life restoration of Ulemica

Venyukovioidea was named for Venyukovia (in turn, named for that fossil's discoverer, Russian geologist P.N. Venyukov). Venyukovia itself is known only from lower jaw fragments of a single individual, while Otsheria is only represented by a skull, Ulemica by its skull and lower jaws, and the fragmentary Parasuminia only by its jaw tips and part of the roof of the skull. Their skulls superficially resemble those of dicynodonts, with short snouts, large eyes and large temporal fenestrae, although by comparison they have relatively longer snouts and proportions resembling the basal anomodont Biseridens and (superficially) even dinocephalian therapsids. A curious feature of venyukovioids is that the pineal foramen (or "third eye") is surrounded by a raised "collar" or "chimney" of bone to varying degrees of development.

To date, the only known venyukovioid post-cranial remains belong to the derived Suminia. The comparatively long limbs and phalanges with opposable 'thumbs', as well as a long and potentially prehensile tail led to the suggestion that Suminia was adapted for grasping tree branches and lived an arboreal lifestyle.

Compared with other therapsids, venyukovioids are notable for their comparatively long tooth rows with large incisors and a lack of distinct canines. The arrangement of teeth was complex and varied greatly among them. Broadly, they had large and procumbent chisel-shaped incisors at the tips of both upper and lower jaws, while "post-canine" teeth are noticeably smaller, and could be bulbous with sharp tips (Otsheria), bluntly conical (Ulemica) for grinding, or leaf-shaped and serrated for shredding (Suminia). Ulemica is notable for the presence of a short, bulbous caniniform in the middle of its maxilla, much larger than the surrounding peg-like teeth, while the dentition of Suminia is claimed to represent the first evidence of efficient chewing in tetrapods. Ulemica has also been suggested to have had a partial horny covering on its lower jaw, based on the presence of pitting in the jaw bones and a shelf of bone lateral to the toothrow where the upper caniniform seemingly bit against.

A notable aspect of venyukovioids is that they have a very similar jaw structure to the dicynodonts. This includes a wide zygomatic arch that bows upwards, allowing for the attachment of large jaw adductor muscles both inside the temporal fenestra and another on the outside attached beneath the arch (the external lateral adductor). Such a muscle is otherwise only found in dicynodonts proper among anomodonts. There is even a bony shelf of bone on the sides of the lower jaw for these muscles to attach to, very similar to the jaw muscle arrangement of dicynodonts. The jaw joint is also relatively long in venyukovioids, permitting it to slide backwards in a palinal stroke. This is only incipiently present in genera such as Ulemica, but is very well-developed in Suminia, which exhibits extensive sliding of the jaw in parallel with dicynodonts. It was once thought this was a shared trait between them, indicative of a close common ancestry. However, the absence of such palinal chewing in other anomodonts potentially closer to dicynodonts (such as Patranomodon) and its incipient development in less-derived venyukovioids (Ulemica) implies this was an example of convergent evolution as a similar adaptation to herbivory.

== Classification and evolution ==
Venyukovioidea was historically regarded as one of two subdivisions of basal anomodonts along with the 'Dromasauria', with Venyukovioidea as a Laurasian group in the North and 'Dromasauria' as a southern radiation in Gondwana. Both groups were later suggested to be paraphyletic or even polyphyletic relative to each other and to dicynodonts, as proposed by Rubidge & Hopson in 1990, but phylogenetic studies have since borne out Venyukovioidea as a natural group after all ('dromasaurs' meanwhile appear to be genuinely polyphyletic). The cladogram below depicts an example of the paraphyletic interpretation of basal anomodont relationships from Rubidge and Hopson (1990), as modified by Rybczynski (2000) and with members of Venyukovioidea highlighted in green:

- Anomodontia
  - Patranomodon
  - - Otsheria
    - - Galeops
      - - Ulemica
        - Dicynodontia

Although now consistently recognised as monophyletic and a genuine clade, the position of Venyukovioidea in the anomodont tree is not well settled. Initially, venyukovioids were thought to be the most "primitive" anomodonts, representing intermediate forms between derived dicynodonts and the dinocephalian form–as the two groups were sometimes thought to be closely related. As more early anomodonts were discovered at the end of the 20th century and computerised phylogenetic analyses were applied, Venyukovioidea were typically recovered as relatively more derived than both Biseridens and the anomocephaloids and grouped together in a clade with dicynodonts and taxa formerly included in 'Dromasauria' (i.e. Chainosauria). However, more recent analyses since 2017 have swapped this position, with venyukovioids being relatively more basal than anomocephaloids and occupying a more rootward position.

Below are two cladograms depicting examples of these alternative positions. The cladogram on the left depicts Venyukovioidea as closer to dicynodonts (from Cisneros et al. (2015)), while the right cladogram depicts them as more basal (from Angielczyk and Kammerer (2017)). Note the incomplete sampling of venyukovioids in both trees, and the differing position of Suminia.

Cisneros et al. (2015):

- Anomodontia
  - Biseridens
  - - Anomocephaloidea
      - Tiarajudens
      - Anomocephalus
    - - Galechirus
      - Venyukovioidea
        - Otsheria
        - - Suminia
          - Ulemica
      - Chainosauria
        - Patranomodon
        - - Galeops
          - Dicynodontia

Angielczyk and Kammerer (2017):

- Anomodontia
  - Biseridens
  - - Venyukovioidea
      - Suminia
      - - Otsheria
        - Ulemica
    - Chainosauria
      - Galepus
      - - Anomocephaloidea
          - Tiarajudens
          - Anomocephalus
        - - Patranomodon
          - - Galechirus
            - - Galeops
              - Dicynodontia

Subsequently, the biogeographic origins and evolution of Venyukovioidea is also unclear. As the group is endemic to Russia, it was initially thought that they originated in the northern hemisphere. However, as more basal anomodonts were discovered in South Africa (such as Anomocephalus and Patranomodon), it was then suggested that anomodonts may have arisen in Gondwana, including the common ancestor of venyukovioids which later migrated to and radiated in Laurasia. Under their paraphyletic interpretation, Rubidge & Hopson (1990) suggested that there was a free exchange of anomodonts between the two hemispheres. The subsequent identification of the Chinese therapsid Biseridens as the most basal known anomodont in 2009 lead Liu and colleagues to propose anomodonts had indeed originated in Laurasia before separating into two distinct radiations, Venyukovioidea in the North and a Southern radiation of chainosaurs, including the ancestral dicynodonts.

=== Alternate taxonomies ===
In 2008, Russian palaeontologist Mikhaïl Ivakhnenko proposed an alternative taxonomic scheme for the taxa included in Venyukovioidea, as well as for anomodonts in general. He coined the order Ulemicia for Ulemica, Venyukovia and Otsheria, and further divided them into two families, Venyukoviidae and the monotypic Ulemicidae. Suminia (and later Parasuminia under this scheme), however, was not thought to be closely related to these 'ulemicians', unlike previous literature, and was instead referred to another family and order altogether, the Galeopidae. This scheme was modified in 2026 by V. V. Bulanov and colleagues, who concluded that other galeopids more closely resembled each other and were so distinct from Galeops itself to warrant being placed in another family. They hence classified Suminia, Parasuminia and the newly described Parasilvia with Galechirus under Galechiridae.

Galeopidae and Galechiridae were initially coined for the South African 'dromasaurs' (Galeops, Galechirus and Galepus) by palaeontologist Robert Broom in 1912, but were expanded under Ivakhnenko's taxonomic scheme. Both families are included under a modified version of 'Dromasauria' (originally altered to "Dromasaurida" by Ivakhnenko), which itself was regarded as a suborder of Dicynodontia ('true' dicynodonts were placed in the sister suborder Dicynodontida). Ivakhnenko divided the 'ulemicians' from dicynodonts (including 'dromasauridans') by the anatomy of their jaw joints, interpreting the well-developed sliding jaw joints of Suminia, Galeops and dicynodonts to indicate a closer relationships between them than to the more basal 'ulemicians'. This opposes the typical phylogenetic interpretation of basal anomodont relationships and of Venyukovioidea, and has not been adopted outside of Russian literature.
