= Parasuminia =

Parasuminia Temporal range: Middle Permian, Late Capitanian ~259 Ma

Scientific classification
- Kingdom: Animalia
- Phylum: Chordata
- Clade: Synapsida
- Clade: Therapsida
- Clade: †Anomodontia
- Genus: †Parasuminia; Kurkin, 2017
- Species: †P. ivakhnenkoi

Binomial name
- †Parasuminia ivakhnenkoi Kurkin, 2017

Genus of anomodont therapsid (fossil)

Parasumina is an extinct genus of anomodont known from the late Capitanian age at the end of the middle Permian period of European Russia. The type and only species is Parasuminia ivakhnenkoi. It was closely related to Suminia, another Russian anomodont, and was named for its resemblance ("similar to Suminia"). Little is known about Parasuminia as the only fossils are of fragmentary pieces of the skull and jaw, but the known remains suggest that its head and jaws were deeper and more robust than those of Suminia, and with shorter, stouter teeth. However, despite these differences they appear to have been similar animals with a similarly complex method of processing vegetation.

== History of discovery ==
Fossils of Parasuminia are known exclusively from a locality known as Sundyr-1 near the mouth of the Sundyr River (a tributary to the Volga River) in the Mari El Republic of European Russia, and were first discovered in 2009 by an expedition from the Borissiak Paleontological Institute of the Russian Academy of Sciences, Moscow. The site itself was originally discovered by a group of schoolboys in 1997, and the site and its fossils were briefly reported on by A. Yu. Bezerin in 2005 who referred to the site as the "Yul’yaly locality". The site was later renamed Sundyr-1 and interpreted to belong to a new stratigraphic member, the Ustpoldarsa Member, of the Poldarsa Formation. The fossil fauna recovered from Sundyr-1 have been collated into the Sundyr Assemblage Zone, interpreted as representing an intermediate fauna between the older Middle Permian 'dinocephalian faunas' and later 'theriodontian faunas' of the Late Permian. The Sundyr Assemblage has been interpreted as belonging to the lower Upper Severodvinian stage in Russian stratigraphy, correlating to the upper Capitanian stage of the International Stratigraphic Scale dating to approximately 259 million years ago.

The remains of Parasuminia were initially referred to as 'aff. Suminia', and were later described as a distinct genus and species in 2017 by A. A. Kurkin. The holotype specimen, PIN no. 5388/196, consists of a partial pair of lower jaws with teeth. Other specimens include numerous lower jaw fragments, a single partial premaxilla and many isolated teeth. An isolated right parietal, PIN no. 5388/198, may also belong to Parasuminia. The remains of Parasuminia currently consist only of fragmented, disarticulated pieces of skull as well as isolated pairs of dentaries that remain held together by strong suturing at the jaw tips. The generic name is from the Ancient Greek "para" ("close", "similar") and the genus Suminia for its close resemblance and relationship to the latter. The specific name is in memory of the palaeontologist Mikhail F. Ivakhnenko and in recognition of his "outstanding" work on Russian palaeontology.

== Description ==
Parasuminia is only known from incomplete remains of the lower jaw and the front of the snout. Compared to Suminia, the lower jaw is deeper and more robust, and is down-turned towards its tip with a deep, rounded 'chin'. The teeth in both the upper and lower jaws are lower and wider than in Suminia, with serrated edges only found on the newest replacement teeth before being worn away. The tooth row consists of 10 to 12 teeth and is straight along its surface, with longer procumbent (forward projecting) incisors at the tip of the lower jaw to accommodate the down-turned tip. Likewise, the premaxilla from the front of the upper jaw is also taller than in Suminia and with relatively shorter teeth. The tips of the upper jaw are similarly deflected upwards, opposing the down-turned lower jaw, and the front teeth are also procumbent. Although incomplete, the total length of the skull was estimated to be roughly 7–8 centimetres (2.8–3.1 in) long, slightly larger than the 58 millimetres (2.3 in) long skull of Suminia.

The parietal bone from the back of the skull roof is larger and proportionately wider than it is in Suminia, and completely surrounds the circular pineal foramen (or "third eye"). The pineal foramen itself is raised slightly above the surface of the skull; however, it is less raised than the chimney-like structure in Suminia and has more gently sloping sides. In contrast with the smooth surface of the rest of the parietal, the bone around the pineal foramen has a rugose texture, imprinted with blood vessels.

== Classification ==
Parasuminia was assigned to the family Galeopidae by Kurkin, a family originally erected solely for the South African anomodont Galeops by palaeontologist Robert Broom in 1912. Galeops was formerly included in a group of small anomodonts known as the 'dromasaurs' together with Galechirus and Galepus, however, phylogenetic analyses of anomodonts have since shown that 'dromasaurs' are polyphyletic and so are not a natural group of related species.

However, Kurkin assigned Parasuminia to Galeopidae based on an alternative taxonomic classification for anomodonts (as well as other synapsids) proposed by Russian palaeontologist M. F. Ivakhnenko. Under Ivakhnenko's taxonomy, the family Galeopidae consists of the traditional 'dromasaurs' as well as other anomodonts, including Suminia and Anomocephalus, and is classed within the suborder Dromasaurida, itself under the order Dicynodontia proper. Ivakhnenko proposed galeopids were grouped together for their use a palinal jaw stroke (pulling their lower jaw backwards to chew), a trait they share with dicynodonts which he considered to indicate they shared a common ancestry. This opposes modern orthodox phylogenetic classifications of anomodonts, which do not group these anomodonts together within a single clade.

Parasuminia has yet to be included in a phylogenetic analysis of anomodonts, and so its evolutionary relationships outside of this scheme are unclear. However, Parasuminia was referred to the Venyukovioidea, a clade that includes Suminia but not any of the 'dromasaurs', by palaeontologists Kenneth Angielczyk and Christian Kammerer in 2018.

== Palaeobiology ==
Like other related anomodonts, Parasuminia would have been a herbivore. Due to the similarity of the wear marks left on the teeth of Parasuminia to those of Suminia, it is likely that they both fed in a similar fashion with extensive tooth-on-tooth occlusion. Furthermore, although the jaw joint of Parasuminia is unknown, it can be inferred from the pattern of wear that Parasuminia was capable of a palinal jaw stroke to shred vegetation. This complex method of chewing is shared with both Suminia and the dicynodonts.

== Palaeoecology ==
In the Sundyr Assemblage fauna, Parasuminia coexisted with two large carnivorous therocephalians, the predatory scylacosaurid Julognathus and the suggested scavenger Gorynychus sundyrensis. Large herbivores are poorly known, and are only represented by dinocephalians possibly similar to Ulemosaurus. A number of early tetrapods are also known from this assemblage, including Leptoropha aff. talonophora, Microphon, Enosuchus sp., and the chroniosuchian Suchonica, as well as the temnospondyl amphibian Dvinosaurus sp.

The Sundyr Assemblage fauna has been considered to be a 'crisis fauna', representing the last of the dinocephalian dominated faunas in Eurasia at the end of the Middle Permian and transitioning into the theriodontian dominated faunas of the Late Permian.
