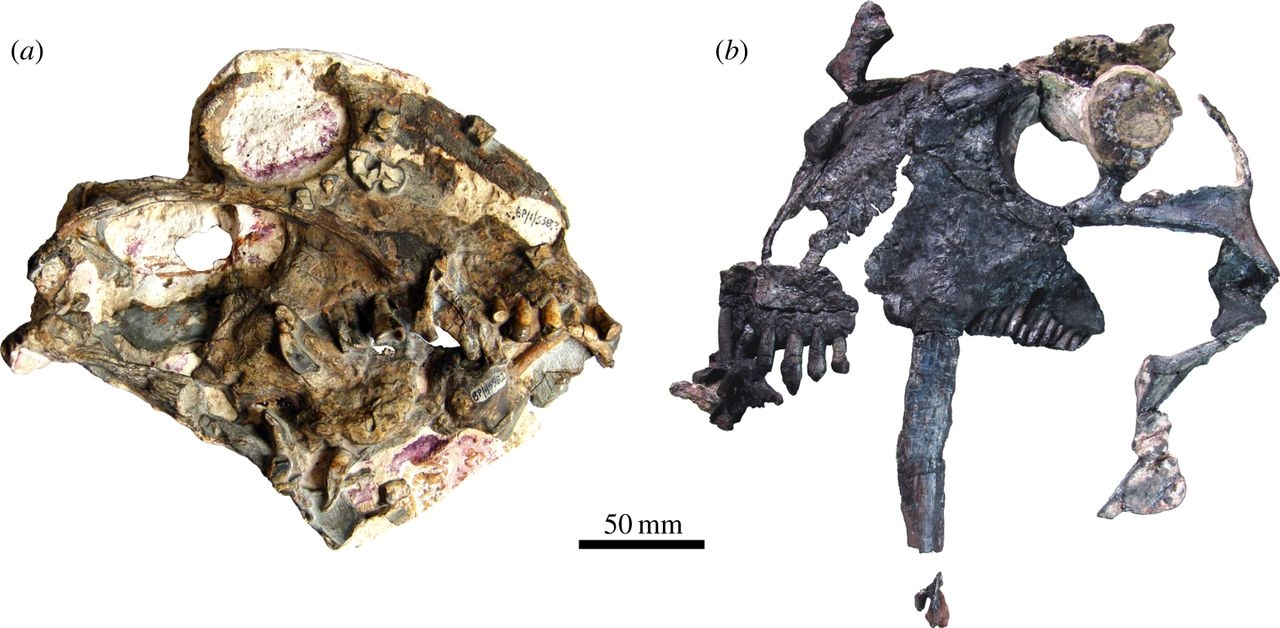
- Skulls of Anomocephalus (left) and Tiarajudens (right)

Scientific classification
- Kingdom: Animalia
- Phylum: Chordata
- Clade: Synapsida
- Clade: Therapsida
- Clade: †Anomodontia
- Clade: †Anomocephaloidea; Cisneros et al., 2011

Genera
- †Anomocephalus; †Tiarajudens

= Anomocephaloidea =

Anomocephaloidea Temporal range: Middle Permian

Extinct clade of therapsids

Anomocephaloidea is a clade of basal anomodont therapsids related to the dicynodonts known from what is now South Africa and Brazil during the Middle Permian. It includes only two species, Anomocephalus africanus (the clade's namesake) from the Karoo Basin of South Africa and Tiarajudens eccentricus from the Paraná Basin of Brazil. Anomocephaloidea was named in 2011 with the discovery of Tiarajudens, although Anomocephalus itself has been known since 1999.

Anomocephaloids are characterised by batteries of tightly occluding molariform teeth at the back of the jaws, the first example of such teeth in the therapsid fossil record. Uniquely to anomocephaloids, though, the upper molariforms are in fact expanded palatal teeth from the roof of the mouth that occlude against the marginal dentition of the lower jaw. Such occlusion between palatal and marginal teeth is not known in any other synapsids. The precise occlusion, heavy wear, and rapid tooth replacement of anomocephaloid teeth all suggests that they fed upon tough, high-fibre vegetation. The adaptations of anomocephaloids to herbivory were novel both within anomodonts, but also for therapsids and mammal evolution as a whole.

== Description ==
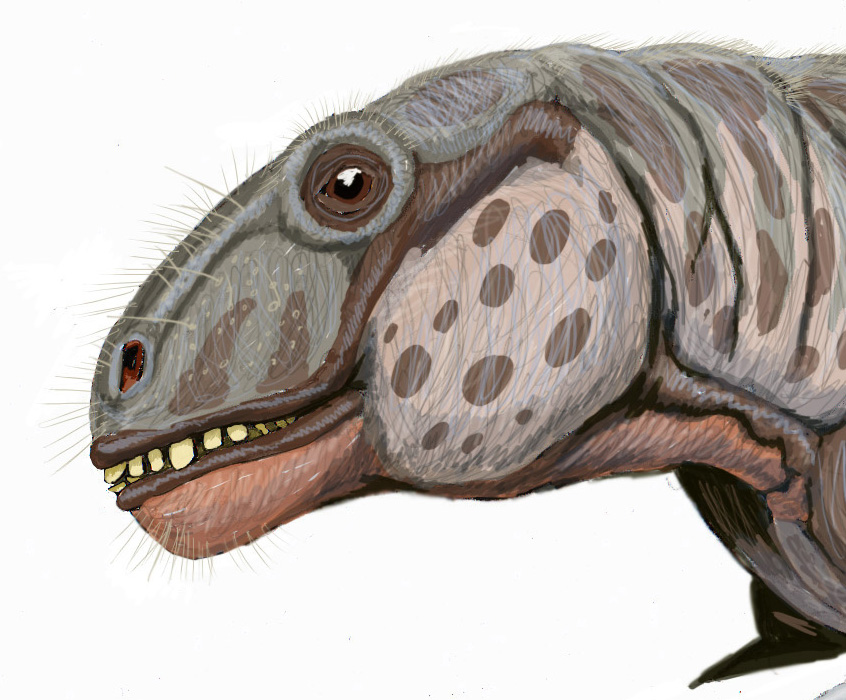
Life restoration of Anomocephalus, the clade's namesake

Anomocephalus and Tiarajudens are very similar to each other, and are only definitely distinguished by the large sabre-like caniniform teeth of Tiarajudens. They both had short and deep skulls resembling those of dicynodonts, but although their snouts are short they are still proportionally longer than those of other anomodonts (occupying ~45% of the total skull length). Both species had skulls between 21–22.5 centimetres (8.3–8.9 in) long, a third longer than that of the next largest basal anomodont (Ulemica).

From their limited post-cranial remains, anomocephaloids were bulky and dicynodont-like in proportions (although they were not especially closely related to them). They were unlike other, smaller basal anomodonts, such as the venyukovioids, which were slender and lightly built. Despite the limited material, however, both species are some of the few therapsids known to have preserved gastralia, or belly ribs.

=== Dentition ===
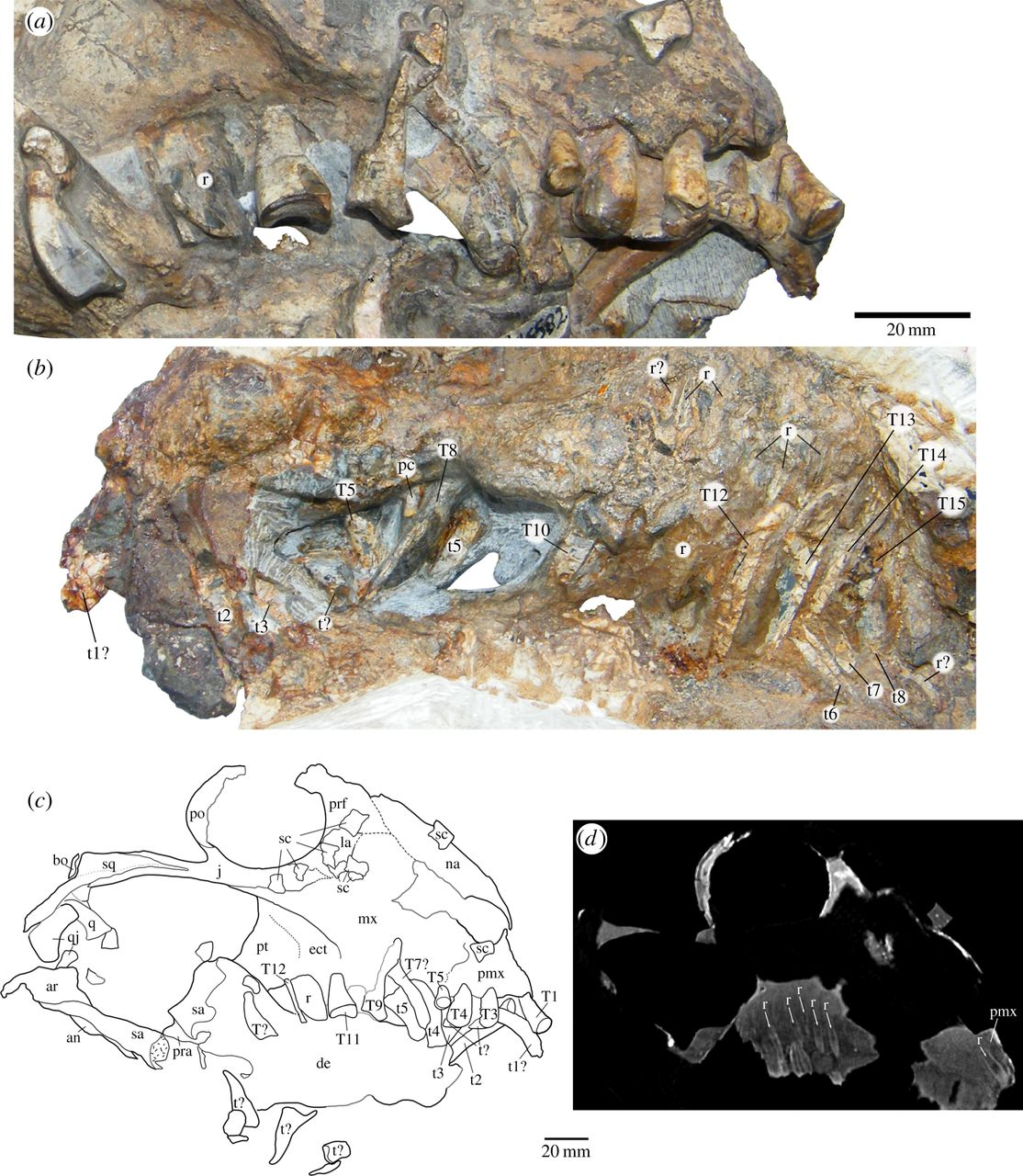
The dentition of Anomocephalus

The dentition of anomocephaloids is unusual and highly characteristic. The molariform palatal teeth are broad, three times wider than long, and when worn have a saddle-shaped crown with a raised labial (outer) edge and a broader, lower lingual (inner) surface. They are tightly packed and arranged en echelon across two bones of the palate, the pterygoid bone and, uniquely for therapsids, the ectopterygoid. Ectopterygoid teeth are found in 'pelycosaur'-grade synapsids, but are otherwise absent from therapsids except for anomocephaloids. These teeth were replaced frequently in waves, indicative of their heavy wear and use. These teeth tightly occluded with the similarly shaped rear teeth of the lower jaw, an adaptation to efficiently process high-fibre food in herbivorous tetrapods. Occlusion between palatal and marginal teeth is wholly unique to anomocephaloids amongst synapsids, with only the herbivorous 'pelycosaur' Edaphosaurus showing a comparable arrangement (in which palatal teeth contacted tooth-plates in the mandibles).

This configuration of the palatal teeth means that, unusually, the marginal upper dentition (i.e. the teeth of the premaxilla and maxilla) of both species are almost entirely incisiform. These teeth are leaf-shaped and coarsely serrated in Tiarajudens but are blunt and rounded in Anomocephalus, although this may just be due to heavy wear similar to the palatal teeth. The only other teeth are a tiny, peg-like pre-caniniform in both species and the sabre-like caniniforms themselves of Tiarajudens at the end of the marginal tooth row. The lower dentition likewise is made up of incisiforms at the front and molariforms at the rear.

Although superficially similar to dicynodonts, anomocephaloids lacked the specialised slip of jaw muscle of dicynodonts (and some venyukovioids) that pulled the lower jaw backwards (palinally) to chew. Nonetheless, an incipient palinal jaw stroke may have been possible, as the lower jaw joint had sockets twice as long as they are wide and so potentially allowed the jaw joint to slide back-and-forth against quadrate bone. At the same time, anomocephaloids may also be characterised by a much larger coronoid process on the mandible than other anomodonts (only definitively known in Anomocephalus) which would have supported large and powerful jaw musculature.

== Classification and evolution ==
Anomocephaloidea was defined by Cisneros et al. (2011) as the clade of all taxa closer to Anomocephalus than to Otsheria, a venyukovioid, and was named for the clade containing Anomocephalus and Tiarajudens. In this analysis, Anomocephaloidea was more derived than the basal-most anomodont Biseridens but outside of the clade of Venyukovioidea + Chainosauria. Subsequent analyses (such as Boos et al. 2016) recovered similar results, however, a more recent analysis by Angielczyk and Kammerer in 2017 instead found Anomocephaloidea as a clade within Chainosauria, i.e. closer to dicynodonts than the venyukovioids are, and subsequent analyses (such as Angielczyk et al. 2021) have recovered the same result.

Two cladograms are shown below depicting the original phylogeny from Cisneros et al. (2011) (left) and that of Angielczyk & Kammerer (2017) (right), both simplified, highlighting the differing placement of Anomocephaloidea within anomodonts:

Cisneros et al. (2011):

- Anomodontia
  - Biseridens
  - - Anomocephaloidea
      - Tiarajudens
      - Anomocephalus
    - - Galechirus
      - Venyukovioidea
        - Otsheria
        - - Suminia
          - Ulemica
      - Chainosauria
        - Patranomodon
        - - Galeops
          - Dicynodontia

Angielczyk and Kammerer (2017):

- Anomodontia
  - Biseridens
  - - Venyukovioidea
      - Suminia
      - - Otsheria
        - Ulemica
    - Chainosauria
      - Galepus
      - - Anomocephaloidea
          - Tiarajudens
          - Anomocephalus
        - - Patranomodon
          - - Galechirus
            - - Galeops
              - Dicynodontia

Anomocephaloids demonstrate that early anomodonts, although rare, were experimenting with diverse morphologies and ecologies for herbivory distinct from those of the highly successful dicynodonts. They also demonstrate that precise, mammalian levels of tooth occlusion evolved much earlier and independently of them in synapsid evolution.

Anomocephalus was once considered the most basal known anomodont, and so was used to infer a Gondwanan origin for the whole group. The discovery of the closely related Tiarajudens forming the clade Anomocephaloidea suggested they may represent an endemic radiation of early Gondwanan anomodonts, comparable to the radiation of venyukovioids in Eurasia.
