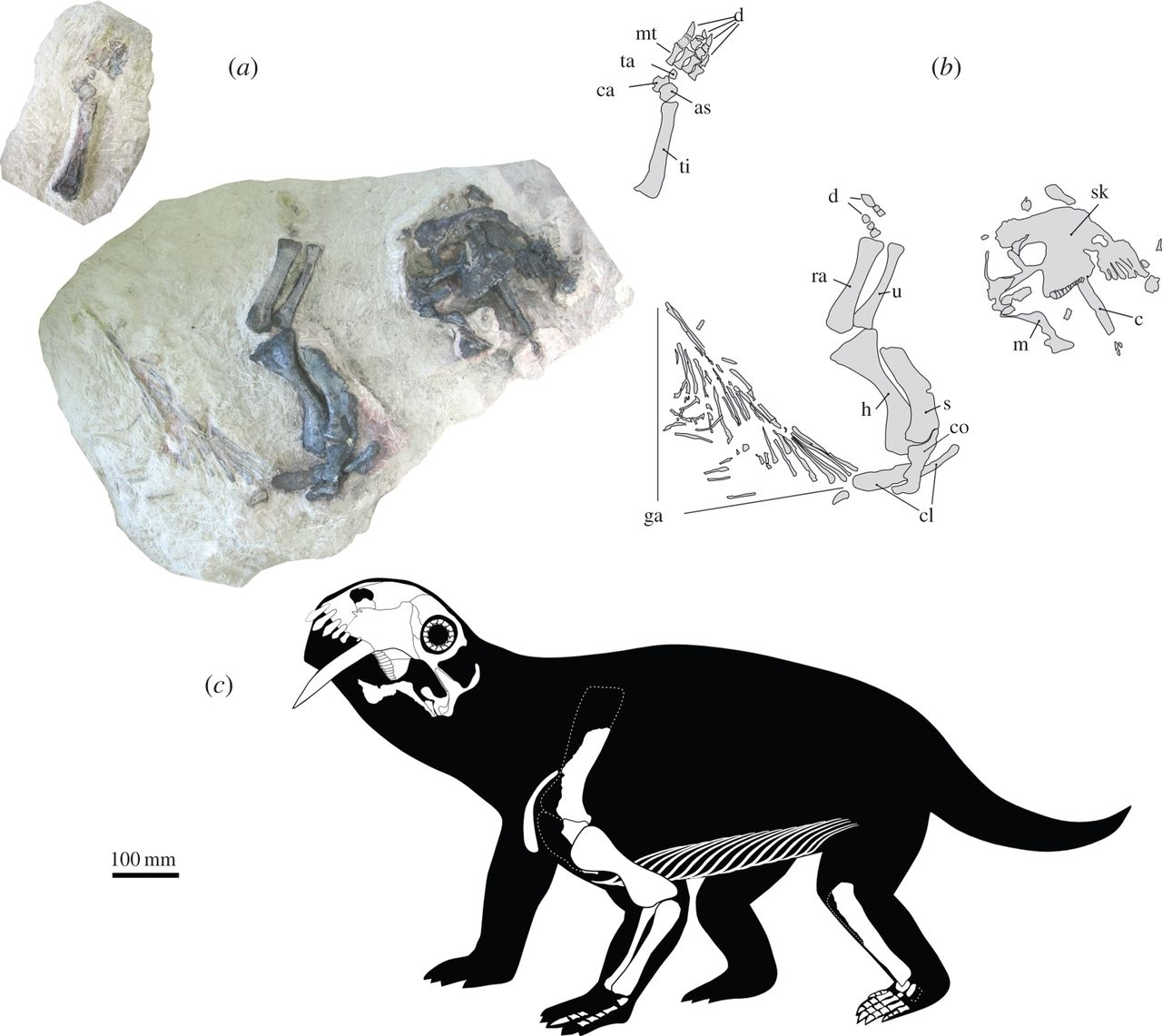
- Diagram skeleton of T. eccentricus. (Note: (a) Sandstone blocks containing articulated skeletal material. (b) Schematic drawing showing the identity of the preserved elements. (c) Skeletal reconstruction. as, astragalus; c, caniniform; ca, calcaneum; cl, clavicle; co, coracoid; d, digits; ga, gastralia; h, humerus; m, mandible; mt, metatarsals; ra, radius; sk, skull; ti, tibia; ta, tarsal.)

Scientific classification
- Kingdom: Animalia
- Phylum: Chordata
- Clade: Synapsida
- Clade: Therapsida
- Clade: †Anomodontia
- Genus: †Tiarajudens; Cisneros et al., 2011
- Species: †T. eccentricus

Binomial name
- †Tiarajudens eccentricus Cisneros et al., 2011

= Tiarajudens =

Tiarajudens Temporal range: Capitanian ~260 Ma

Extinct genus of therapsids

Tiarajudens (tee-AIR-ə-JOO-dens) ("Tiaraju tooth") is an extinct genus of saber-toothed herbivorous anomodonts which lived during the Middle Permian period (Capitanian stage) in what is now Rio Grande do Sul, Brazil. It is known from the holotype UFRGS PV393P, a nearly complete skull. The type species T. eccentricus was named in 2011.

== Description ==
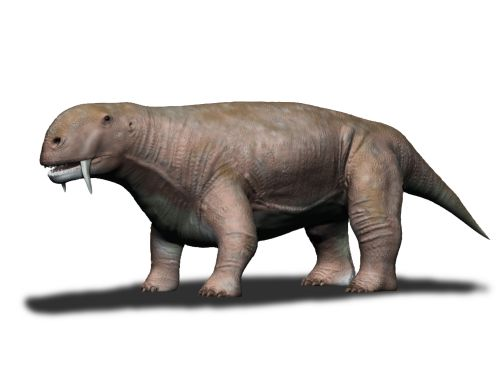
Restoration

Tiarajudens is a member of Anomodontia, a suborder of therapsids. Like other anomodonts, it was a quadrupedal herbivore about the size of a wild boar. The single fragmented holotype skull is short and robust at about 22.5 centimetres (8.9 in) in length. The most prominent features of Tiarajudens are its two large saber-like canine teeth. These teeth are unlike the tusks of dicynodonts, a later group of anomodonts. Twenty-one high-crowned teeth are present on either side of the upper jaw, including spoon-shaped incisors. Wide palatal teeth are also present. The top and bottom sets of teeth fit closely together, much like the teeth of mammals, allowing it to easily chew plants.

== History ==
The type species of Tiarajudens, T. eccentricus, was described in the journal Science in 2011. It was named by Juan Carlos Cisneros, Fernando Abdala, Bruce S. Rubidge, Paula Camboim Dentzien-Dias, and Ana de Oliveira Bueno. The skull was found in the Middle Permian Rio do Rasto Formation in Rio Grande do Sul. Paleontologists found the location using satellite photographs from Google Earth. The locality was identified as a clearing within a thickly vegetated area. The degree of erosion and the color of the rocks were an indication of the locality's age and likelihood of preserving fossils.

== Phylogeny ==
Cladogram after Cisneros et al., 2011:

- Therapsida
  - Tetraceratops
  - - Raranimus
    - - Lycosuchus
      - - - Biarmosuchus
          - - Gorgonops
            - Herpetoskylax
        - - - Estemmenosuchus
            - - Tapinocaninus
              - - Titanophoneus
                - Syodon
          - Anomodontia
            - Biseridens
            - - Anomocephaloidea
                - Tiarajudens
                - Anomocephalus
              - - Galechirus
                - Venyukovioidea
                  - Otsheria
                  - - Suminia
                    - Ulemica
                - - Patranomodon
                  - - Galeops
                    - - Eodicynodon
                      - - Diictodon
                        - Robertia

== Paleobiology ==
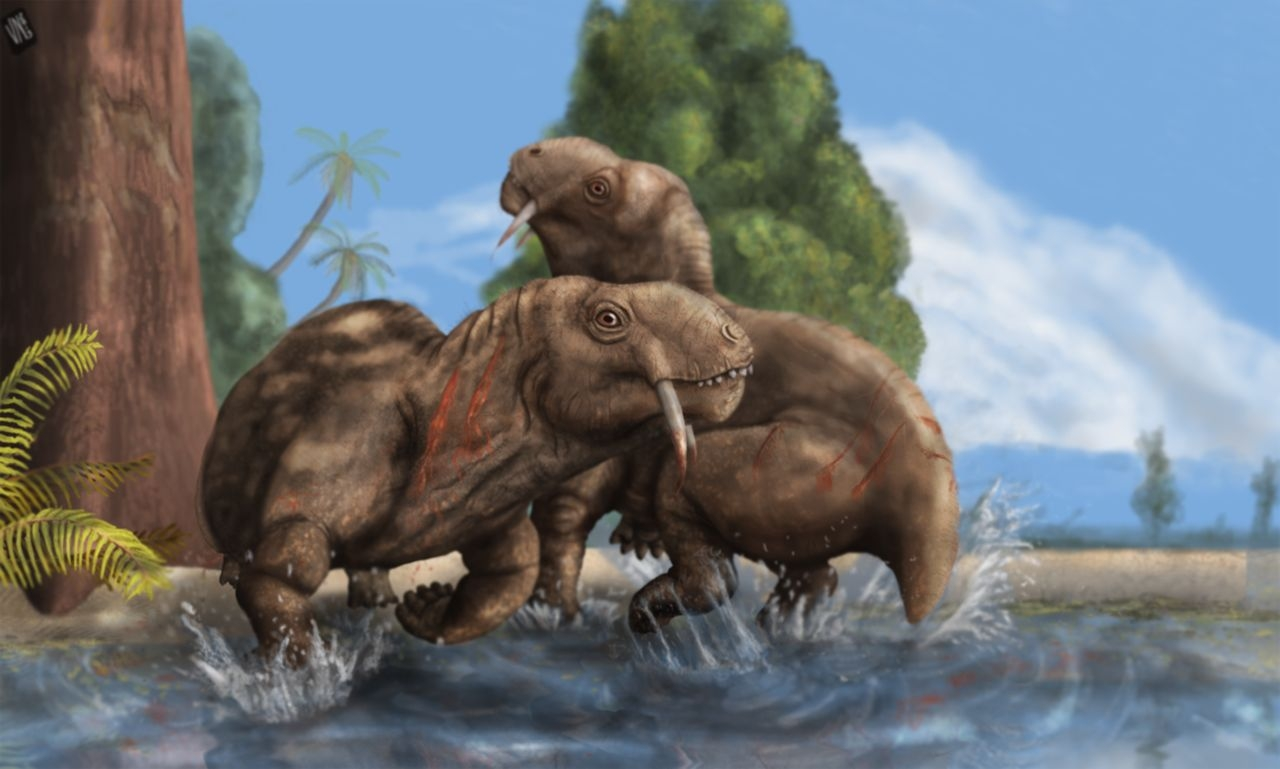
Paleoart depicting one of the possible uses of the saber-shaped canine teeth of Tiarajudens

The saber-like teeth of Tiarajudens are unique among anomodonts, a group of entirely herbivorous therapsids. Although large canines are often found in carnivores, the surrounding teeth of Tiarajudens indicate that it was an herbivore. Tiarajudens is one of the earliest herbivores to possess saber-like canines; previously the oldest known saber-toothed herbivores were large extinct mammals such as Titanoides, which lived around 60 million years ago. The teeth are even larger than those of the carnivorous therapsid Inostrancevia, one of the largest members of Gorgonopsia, a group characterized by the presence of long canines. The large canines of Tiarajudens were likely used as a defense against predators or as a means of fighting for mates; living mammals such as the water deer and musk deer use their saber teeth for these purposes. The palatal teeth are broad and fit tightly together, an adaptation to consuming fibrous plants. This variation in tooth shape, known as a heterodont dentition, is common in mammals. While most other Permian therapsids had homodont dentitions (teeth of the same shape), Tiarajudens is one of the earliest therapsids to have a heterodont dentition.

== See also ==
- List of synapsids
- Sepé Tiaraju
