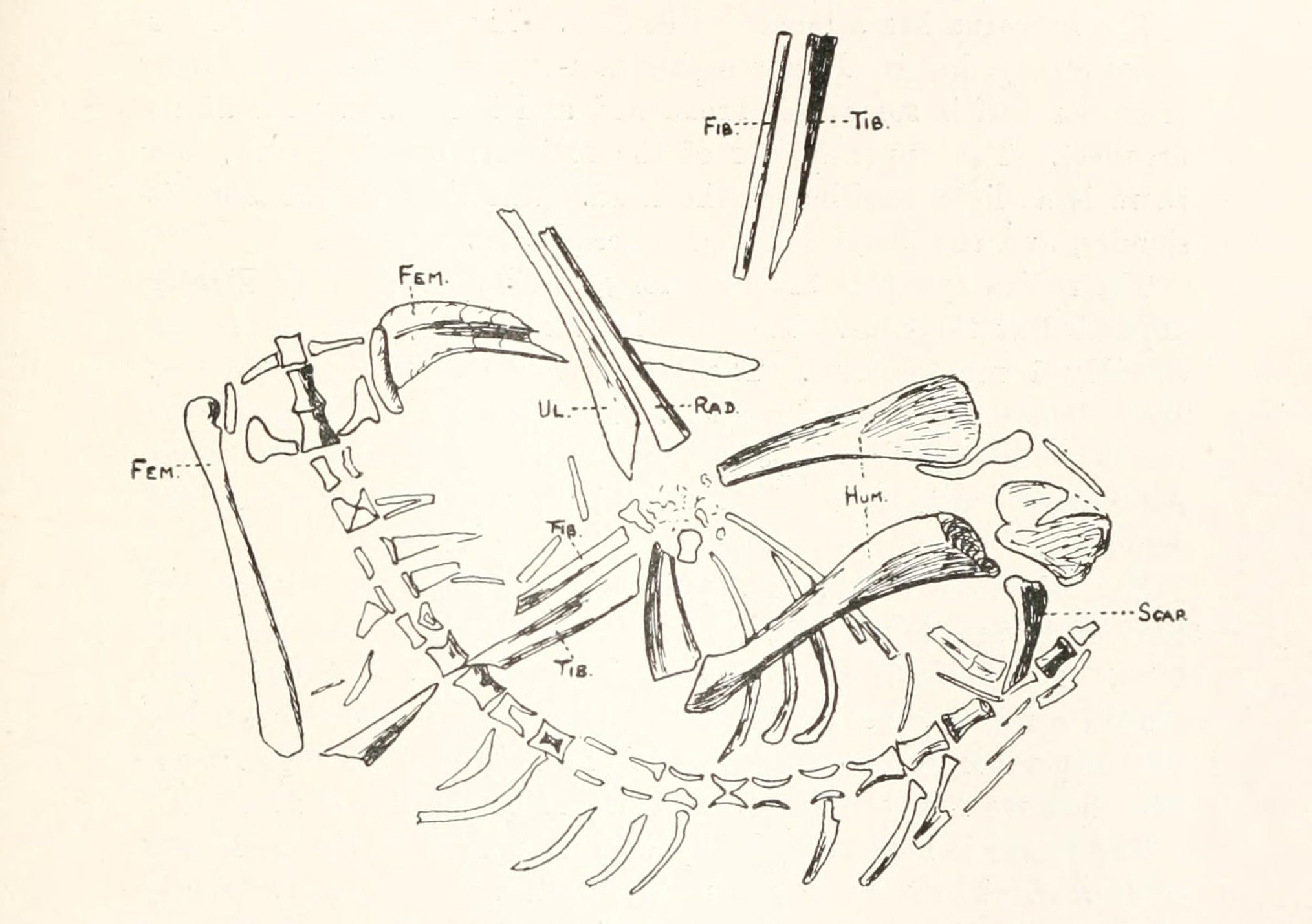
- Illustration of the holotype skeleton (SAM 4004) of Macroscelesaurus janseni, 1918

Scientific classification
- Kingdom: Animalia
- Phylum: Chordata
- Clade: Synapsida
- Clade: Therapsida
- Clade: †Therocephalia
- Superfamily: †Baurioidea
- Genus: †Macroscelesaurus; Haughton, 1918

Type species
- †Macroscelesaurus janseni Haughton, 1918

Synonyms
- Haughtoniscus Kuhn, 1934

= Macroscelesaurus =

Macroscelesaurus Temporal range: Late Permian

Genus of therapsid from Late Permian South Africa

Macroscelesaurus is an extinct genus of therocephalian therapsid from the Late Permian of South Africa. The type species Macroscelesaurus janseni was named by Sidney H. Haughton in 1918 from the Cistecephalus Assemblage Zone. It is one of the few therocephalians known from postcranial remains.

== Description and history ==
Macroscelesaurus is known from a single holotype consisting of the mold of a partial skeleton (SAM 4004). The impression was found on a sandstone block that made up the wall of a kraal or sheep enclosure near the town of Victoria West. It includes most of the postcranial skeleton, including the vertebral column, ribs, limbs, and the pelvic and pectoral girdles. Most of the skull is not preserved. The skeleton is preserved in ventral view, with the body curving to the right and the limbs bent to one side. The specimen was brought to South African paleontologist Sidney H. Haughton, accessioned at the South African Museum, and formally described the next year in Annals of the South African Museum. On the basis of the impression, Haughton designated the species Macroscelesaurus janseni, after the discoverer of the specimen, F. J. Jansen. Although it was not found in a deposit, Haughton thought that the specimen originated from rock layers belonging to the Tapinocephalus Assemblage Zone. The fossil is now thought to have been from the younger Cistecephalus Assemblage Zone.

German paleontologist Oskar Kuhn renamed Macroscelesaurus as Haughtoniscus in 1934, as he thought the original name was too similar to Macroscelosaurus, the generic name for a prolacertiform reptile that had described in 1852. Under the rules of the International Code of Zoological Nomenclature, Kuhn's renaming was inappropriate and the name Macroscelesaurus is still considered valid.

== Classification ==
Haughton considered placing it within Dromasauria, a group of small anomodont therapsids. Most similarities between the two therapsids were seen in the limbs. He noted several differences, including the relatively large hind limbs of Macroscelesaurus (the fore and hind limbs of dromasaurians are about equal in length) and enlarged canines, which are not seen in dromasaurians. Haughton also considered the possibility that Macroscelesaurus was a therocephalian therapsid, because it shared more features in common with Ictidosuchus than any other therapsid.

Macroscelesaurus is now classified in the therocephalian clade Baurioidea, although its exact position is uncertain.
