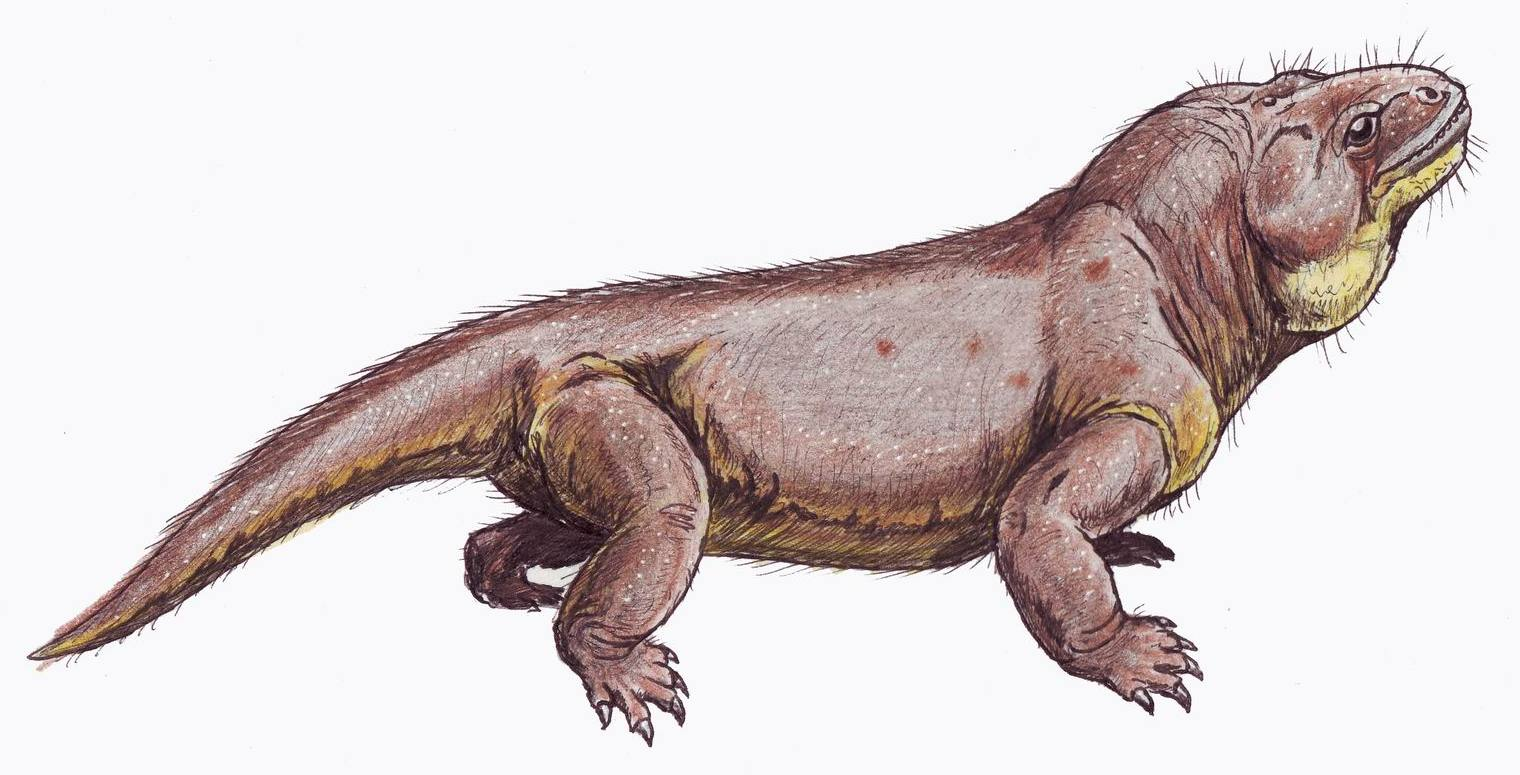
- Speculative life restoration of Venyukovia

Scientific classification
- Kingdom: Animalia
- Phylum: Chordata
- Clade: Synapsida
- Clade: Therapsida
- Clade: †Anomodontia
- Infraorder: †Venyukovioidea
- Genus: †Venyukovia; Amalitskii, 1922
- Species: †V. prima

Binomial name
- †Venyukovia prima Amalitskii, 1922

= Venyukovia =

Venyukovia Temporal range: Middle Permian, ~267 Ma

Extinct genus of therapsids

Venyukovia (named after its discoverer, Pavel N. Venyukov) is an extinct genus of venyukovioid therapsid, a basal anomodont from the Middle Permian of Russia. The type and sole species, Venyukovia prima, is known only by a partial lower jaw with teeth. Venyukovia has often been incorrectly spelt as 'Venjukovia' in English literature. This stems from a spelling error made by Russian palaeontologist Ivan Efremov in 1940, who mistakenly replaced the 'y' with a 'j', which subsequently permeated through therapsid literature before the mistake was caught and corrected. Venyukovia is the namesake for the Venyukovioidea, a group of small Russian basal anomodonts also including the closely related Otsheria, Suminia, Parasuminia and Ulemica, although it itself is also one of the poorest known. Like other venyukovioids, it had large projecting incisor-like teeth at the front and lacked canines, although the remaining teeth are simple compared to some other venyukovioids (e.g. Ulemica, Suminia), but may resemble those of Otsheria.

== Description ==
Little can be said of the overall anatomy of Venyukovia beyond its mandibles and teeth. The partial jaw as preserved measures 52 mm long and is 18 mm high, including the crowns of the teeth. Like other venyukovioids, Venyukovia has large procumbent incisor-like teeth at its jaw tips, possibly two on either side, superficially resembling the incisors of some mammals. There are no canines, and the remaining ten 'cheek' teeth (identified by Amalitskii as molars and premolars) are relatively simple in shape with pointed, laterally compressed crowns. Ivakhnenko (1996) compared Venyukovia favourably to Otsheria, identifying a similar "shearing" dental apparatus between them compared to the more specialised jaws of Ulemica. Like Otsheria, the 'cheek' teeth are bulbous and roughly as wide as they are long.

Notably, Venyukovia appears to lack a lower dentary shelf, a bony structure on the lower jaws of the venyukovioids Ulemica and Suminia and the dicynodonts. This shelf was an attachment point for the powerful lateral adductor jaw muscle that allowed these anomodonts to chew, pulling the mandible backwards, and the absence of the lateral dentary shelf in Venyukovia suggests it may have also lacked this muscle, restricting its jaws to simple up-and-down motions.

== Discovery and naming ==
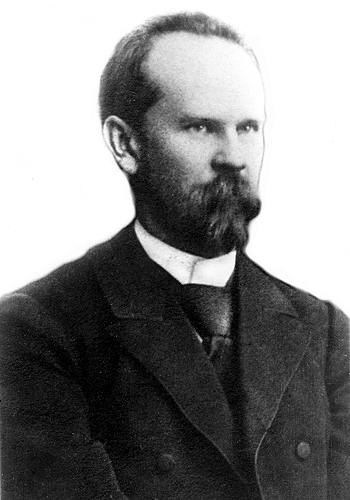
Pavel N. Venyukov, discoverer and namesake of Venyukovia

The only known fossil of Venyukovia was discovered in 1908 by Russian geologist Pavel Nikolaevich Venyukov, for whom it would later be formally named after in 1922. The specimen, now catalogued as PIN (Paleontological Institute) 48/1 was found by Venyukov isolated in a spoil heap of the Kargaly Mines of Orenburg. The mines had excavated the copper-bearing sandstones of the southern Cis-Ural Mountains during the 18th and 19th centuries, and such Russian copper mines were of historical palaeontological significance for the discovery some of the first, albeit fragmentary fossils of Permian therapsids in the world. However, they had since shut down by the time Venyukovia was discovered, and the precise mining locality from where it was collected is unknown.

Venyukov brought his finds to Russian palaeontologist Vladimir P. Amalitskii (a.k.a. Amalitzky), and in a posthumous publication of his notes in 1922 were formally named and briefly described as Venyukovia prima. Amalitskii described two specimens, a partial left mandible with the first right incisor attached (PIN 48/1) and a smaller specimen that he interpreted as the tip of a snout with teeth, later shown to be a mandibular symphysis. Notably, no type specimen of V. prima was given in this publication. This would not be amended until 1983 by Russian palaeontologist Peter Konstantinovich Chudinov who formally designated PIN 48/1 as the lectotype.

Amalitskii had not recognised Venyukovia as a non-mammalian synapsid, and instead had thought it was a triconodont mammal (similar to the first therapsid fossils from Russian copper mines, which were also initially mistaken for true mammals in 1838). The non-mammalian nature of Venyukovia was recognised by American palaeontologist George Gaylord Simpson just six years later in 1928, although he only regarded it as "clearly a reptile". Venyukovia was later correctly shown to be a therapsid by Efremov in 1938, although he interpreted it as a dinocephalian. The true anomodont affinities of Venyukovia were not recognised until 1942 by the English palaeontologist D. M. S. Watson, who would later coin the infraorder Venyukovioidea for it and similar forms from Russia that had been discovered since then with American palaeontologist Alfred Romer in 1956.

Historically, numerous more complete skulls and jaws were referred to Venyukovia from Isheevo, Tatarstan and named as a second species (V. invisa) by Efremov in 1940. In 1983, Chudinov synonymised V. invisa with V. prima, however, in 1996 V. invisa and all its material were moved to their own genus entirely by Russian palaeontologist Mikhaïl Ivakhnenko, Ulemica. Consequently, much of what has been historically written about the morphology and functional anatomy of Venyukovia is actually based upon Ulemica (e.g. Barghusen (1976), King (1994)). In the same paper, Ivakhnenko commented on similarities between the type specimen of Venyukovia and Otsheria, highlighting that the jaw and dental anatomy of Venyukovia matches what would be expected from Otsheria, a venyukovioid known only by its skull, and has even regarded them as potential synonyms. At the same time, Ivakhnenko also regarded the referred specimen PIN 48/2 as being more similar to Ulemica than Venyukovia. Thus, Venyukovia is now represented solely by the lecotype mandible.

== Classification ==
Venyukovia is a member of the infraorder Venyukovioidea, a clade of basal anomodonts related to dicynodonts. Anomodonts were a highly successful group of therapsids, largely represented by dicynodonts but also by a handful of basal genera. Venyukovia was one of the first such basal anomodonts to be discovered, although it was mistaken to be an early mammal at first by Amalitskii due to its mammal-like dentition. Subsequent discoveries have since identified Venyukovia as part of a radiation of basal anomodonts in Eastern Europe for which it is now the namesake, the Venyukovioidea. Venyukovia has additionally also been variously assigned both family-level and subfamily-level ranked groups, the Venyukoviidae and Venyukoviinae. Despite being the group's namesake, it is unclear how Venyukovia is related to other venyukovioids and so these subgroups cannot be reliably defined. This is largely due to the incompleteness of Venyukovia itself, and as such it has not been included in any phylogenetic analyses of basal anomodonts due to the low number of characteristics that can be scored for it in one.

== Palaeoenvironment ==
Although found across various individual mines and mixed in spoil heaps, the fossil flora and fauna of the Kargaly Mines can be recognised as a fossil assemblage. Namely, they have been correlated to the better known Ocher Assemblage Zone to the East. The Kargaly Mines have produced a diverse array of tetrapod, fish, invertebrate (including bivalves, conchostracans, and insects) and plant fossils, although due to their often fragmentary nature specific identifications are uncertain.

Apart from Venyukovia, other therapsids are mostly represented by dinocephalians, including the dubious predatory anteosaur Admetophoneus (possibly a synonym of Titanophoneus) and potentially Syodon (though it is uncertain the referred specimen comes from these deposits), as well as the tapinocephalians Deuterosaurus jubilaei and Ulemosaurus, although fragmentary remains of therocephalians have been identified. Other tetrapods include, Chalcosaurus (a lanthanosuchoid parareptile), early tetrapods such as the seymouriamorph Discosauriscus netschajevi and an unidentified gephyrostegid, while temnospondyls are known by the archegosauroid Platyoposaurus.

Numerous fossils from a wide variety of plants have also been discovered in the copper sandstones of the Kargaly Mines. These include spore-bearing plants like lycopods, horsetails such as Paracalamites, a Phyllotheca-like species, and trunks of the tree-like Calamites, as well as indeterminate ferns. Seed ferns are represented mostly by peltaspermaceans, including pinnate Permocallipteris and monopinnate Compsopteris leaf fronds, whereas the angaropeltacean Phylladoderma is rarer. Ginkgophytes are represented by the leaves Psygmophyllum, Kerpia, and Baiera, while conifers are known by Tylodendron shoots, Steirophyllum, and Cordaicarpus seeds.

From the sedimentology of the deposits, the locality has been interpreted as being located near the foothills of the Paleo-Urals, with abundant vegetation growing around high-energy streams with heavy run-off from the western slopes of mountains. The forests were dominated by conifers and ginkgophytes, with an undergrowth of ferns and seed ferns and horsetails along the riverbanks.
