= Admetophoneus =

Admetophoneus Temporal range: Middle Permian

Scientific classification
- Kingdom: Animalia
- Phylum: Chordata
- Clade: Synapsida
- Clade: Therapsida
- Suborder: †Dinocephalia
- Genus: †Admetophoneus; Efremov, 1954
- Species: †A. kargalensis

Binomial name
- †Admetophoneus kargalensis Efremov, 1954

Extinct genus of therapsids

Admetophoneus is a dubious genus of non-mammalian synapsid from Russia. Its type and only species is Admetophoneus kargalensis.

== History ==
Admetophoneus was named by the Russian paleontologist Ivan Efremov in 1954, based on some teeth, a fragmentary maxilla, and a humerus. It was originally classified as a member of Brithopodidae. Later, it was classified in Phthinosuchidae. Recent study, however, has shown that it is a member of Anteosauria, but lacks diagnostic features. It is essentially identical to the contemporaneous Titanophoneus, and could be synonymous with it, but its poor preservation means that it cannot be proven.

== See also ==
- List of therapsids
