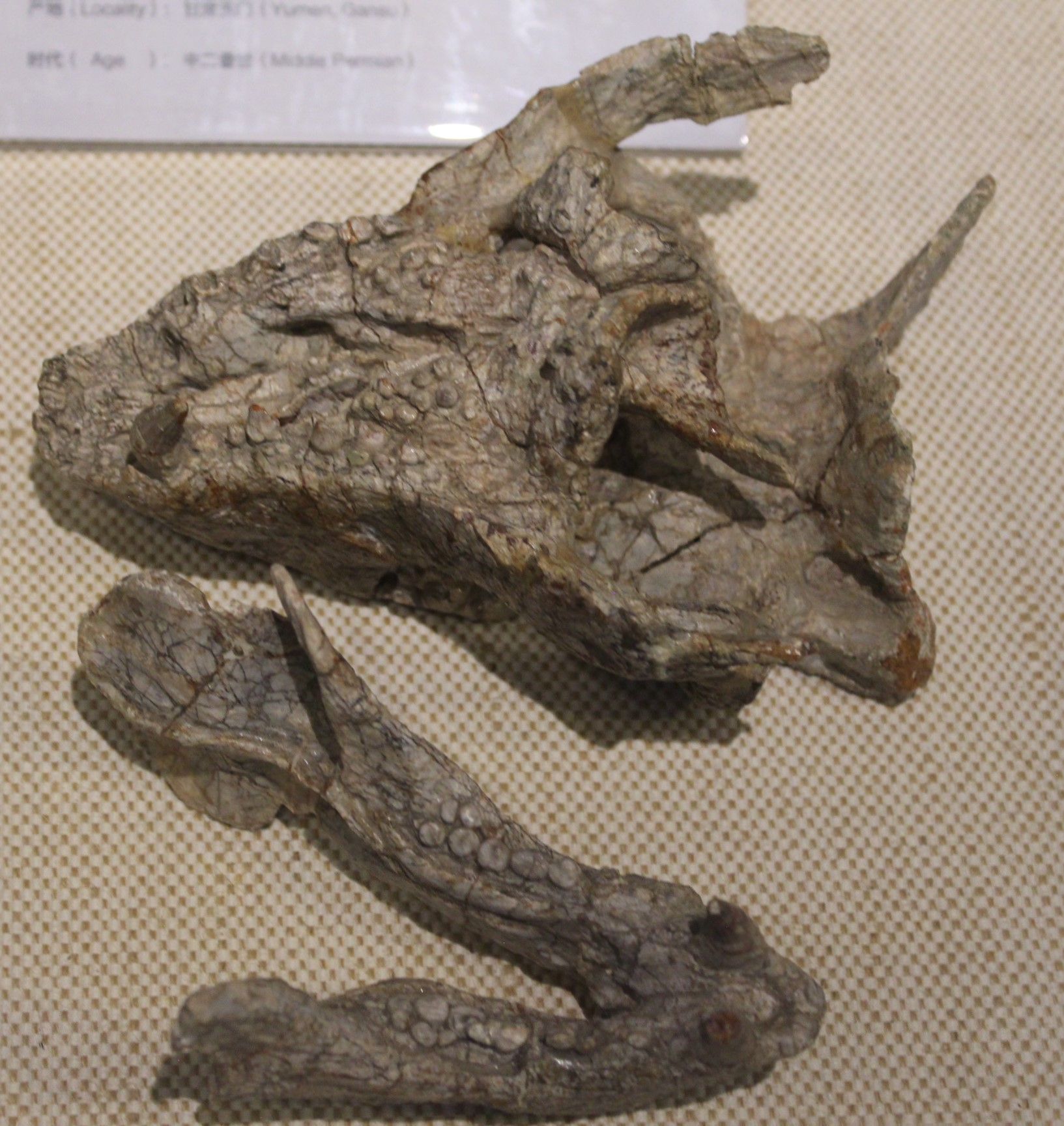
- Holotype skull of B. qilianicus on display at the Paleozoological Museum of China.

Scientific classification
- Kingdom: Animalia
- Phylum: Chordata
- Clade: Synapsida
- Clade: Therapsida
- Clade: †Anomodontia
- Genus: †Biseridens; Li and Cheng, 1997
- Species: †B. qilianicus

Binomial name
- †Biseridens qilianicus Li and Cheng, 1997

= Biseridens =

Biseridens Temporal range: Middle Permian, 270 Ma

Extinct genus of therapsids

Biseridens ("two rows of teeth") is an extinct genus of anomodont therapsid, and one of the most basal anomodont genera known. Originally known from a partial skull misidentified as an eotitanosuchian in 1997, another well-preserved skull was found in the Qingtoushan Formation in the Qilian Mountains of Gansu, China, in 2009 that clarified its relationships to anomodonts, such as the dicynodonts.

Among tetrapod taxa, the therapsid clade anomodontia in which Biseridens belong has one of the largest population sizes, highest levels of diversity, and longest stratigraphic range (Middle Permian to the Triassic, possibly into the Cretaceous), as well as being one of the only clades known from all the continents. Primarily understood from the recently discovered, most-well preserved specimen, Biseridens is most notably distinguishable as an anomodont due to its short snout, dorsally elevated zygomatic arch, and presence of a septomaxilla that distinctly lacks a facial exposure between the nasal and maxilla. The features that distinguish Biseridens from other anomodonts include the presence of heterodont dentition, or differentiated teeth rows in which different teeth have distinct morphology (ex. precanines, canines, molars, etc.), small toothlike projections, or denticles, located on the palatine and pterygoid, articulation between the opisthotic bone and the tabular bones on the posterior surface of the skull, the absence of the mandibular foramen on the lower jaw, and a pterygoid in which the transverse flange of the pterygoid has a laterally extending process but lacks posterior ramus.

== Discovery ==
Until the more recent discovery of a new specimen, Biseridens was primarily known from fragmented skull and jaw material discovered in the 1990s in the upper part of the upper Xidagou Formation of Gansu, China. The specimen included an incomplete skull with the posterior portion of the left ramus of the lower jaw and the anterior part of the lower jaws including well-preserved teeth. The more recently discovered specimen includes a nearly complete skull (lacking the occiput) with lower jaws, found with a set of 14 articulated vertebrae. This new specimen was preserved in mudrock and also discovered in the upper part of Xidagou Formation in Dashankau, Yumen in Gansu.

The name is derived from Biseri- is Latin for "double rows"; -dens is Latin for "tooth".

== Description ==
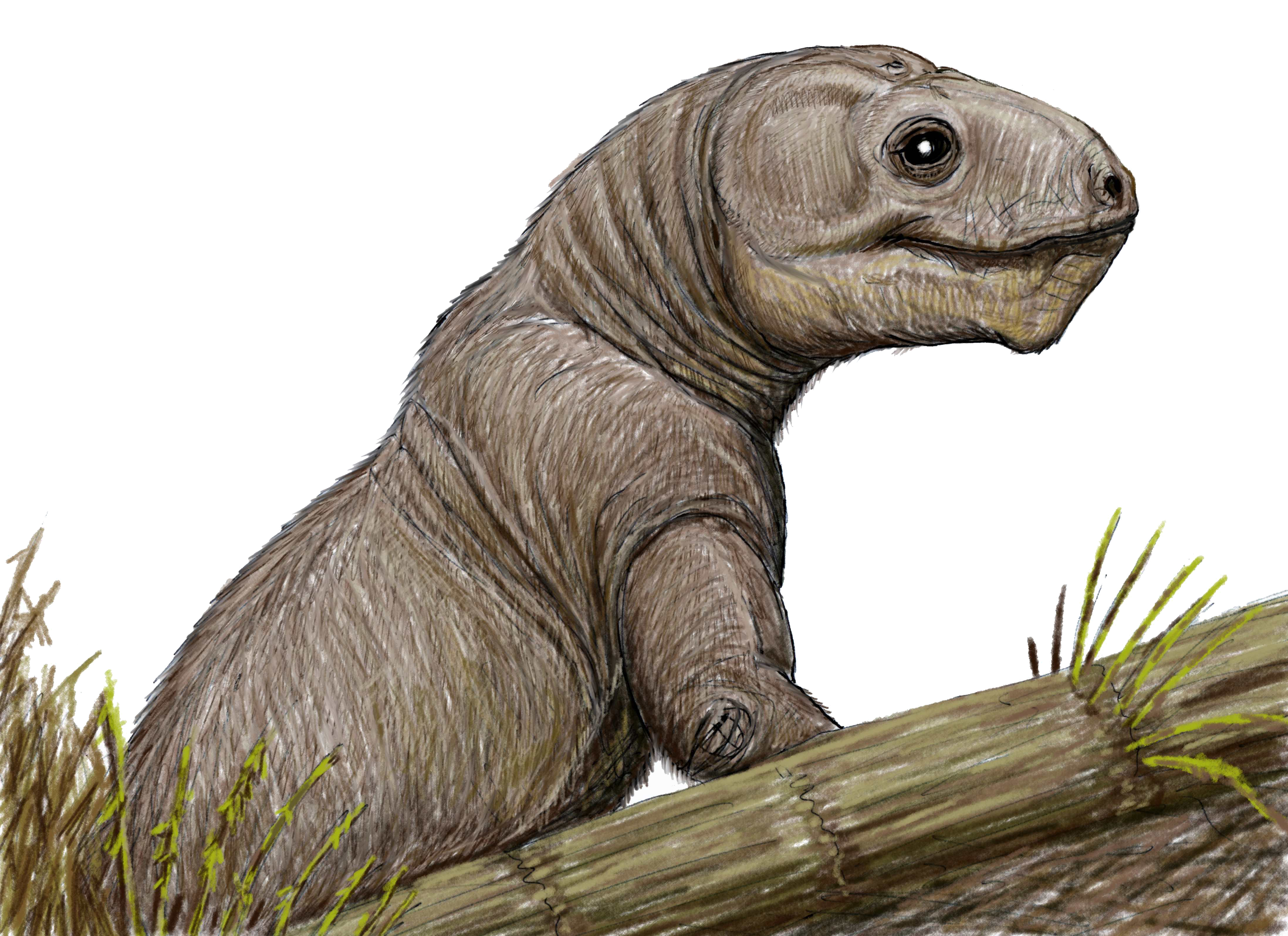
Life restoration

Biseridens is known mostly from skull and jaw material, as well as a series of 14 vertebrae associated with one skull. Like other anomodonts, the region of the skull in front of the eyes is relatively short compared to other therapsids. The orbits are large and rounded, and the temporal fenestra are large and wide and broad zygomatic arches, similar to but not as developed as those of later dicynodonts. The skull is estimated to be at least 17 centimetres (6.7 in) long, relatively small compared to other basal anomodonts.

=== Dentition ===
There are several diagnostic features that characterize this specimen as a Biseridens. Related to its heterodont dentition, Biseridens is distinct from other anomodonts because of a differentiated tooth row that includes two rows of teeth on both the jaws, precanine teeth on the dentary and premaxilla, and a broad spread of teeth on the pterygoid and palatine. There are also denticles on the vomer, palatine, and pterygoid. The postcanines possess oval cross-sections and have grinding surfaces, and the canines have a basal diameter of 10 mm. There are no serrations on the marginal teeth, which aligns Biseridens within the anomodont clade.

=== Palate ===
The paired pterygoid of Biseridens is the most distinctly visible bone on its palate. It contains an anterior process, a quadrate ramus and a ventromedial process. There is a prominent posterolaterally curving transverse curving process. Similar to other basal therapsids, this process reaches much lower than the level of the palate.

=== Skull ===
Regarding its skull structure, the features that distinguish Biseridens from other anomodonts include having an intertemporal region that is wider than the interorbital region, and a temporal fenestra larger than the orbits. Additionally, the mandibular fenestra is absent from the lower jaw, the transverse flange of the pterygoid extends laterally, and there is contact between the tabular and opisthotic, or the posterior part of the otic capsule. There is a concavity on the posterior region of the postorbital bone as well as a lateral process on the postorbital that fails to reach the zygomatic arch. Characteristic of other basal therapsids, the prominent maxilla constitutes the majority of the snout and the nasal bones are the longest bones of the skull roof.

== Classification ==
Biseridens belong to the clade anomodont which is nested within the clade therapsids, often called "mammal-like reptiles". Therapsids are a group of advanced synapsids, one of the major branches of amniotes that gave rise to mammals.

The holotype and paratype of Biseridens were initially referred to Eotitanosuchia, a former suborder of therapsids that included various groups of early therapsids (although the range inclusion varied between authors). The genus was named from the Latin biseri- for "double rows" and -dens ("teeth") to refer to the paired double rows of cheek teeth in each jaw, while the species was named after the Qilian mountains where the fossils were discovered. They also assigned Biseridens to a distinct new family of eotitanosuchians, the Biseridensidae, although they did not provide a diagnosis for this family outside of the genus itself.

Although relatively primitive, a number of shared traits (synapomorphies) ally Biseridens with anomodonts including the shortened snout, raised zygomatic arch and exclusion of the septomaxilla between the maxilla and nasals. However, it retains a number of primitive traits that exclude it from the more derived anomodonts, including the differentiated tooth row, palatal teeth, contact between tabular and opisthotic; lateral process of transverse flange of pterygoid free of posterior ramus and absence of mandibular foramen. Several cladistic analyses indicate that Biseridens is the most basal anomodont known, including that of Liu and colleagues (2009) shown below, as well as those of Cisneros and colleagues (2011) and Kammerer and colleagues (2013):

The most recent analysis performed by Liu et al. in 2009 indicates a significantly stable placement of Biseridens as the most basal anomodont based on a matrix study performed on 75 cranial characters over 15 synapsid genera and conclusions of primitive and derived features. Based on the geographic discoveries of Biseridans, the most basal anomodont, Raranimus, the most basal therapsid, with basal dinocephalians, bolosaurids, and dissorophids, there is now strong evidence that the oldest therapsids resided in China.

- Therapsida
  - unnamed
    - Biarmosuchia
    - Gorgonopsia
  - unnamed
    - Dinocephalia
    - Anomodontia
      - Biseridens
      - unnamed
        - Anomocephalus
        - unnamed
          - Venyukovioidea
            - Otsheria
            - unnamed
              - Ulemica
              - Suminia
          - Chainosauria
            - Patranomodon
            - unnamed
              - Galeops
              - Eodicynodon

A 2026 study suggested that Biseridens wasn't an anomodont, but a basal therapsid outside the major clades or a basal dinocephalian.

== Paleoenvironment ==
At a clade level, anomodonts were terrestrial vertebrates of all sizes that dominated the Late Permian. The most dominant sub-clade were dicynodonts, more derived relatives of Biseridens. Most anomodonts are postulated to have been herbivorous, and they were the only herbivorous taxa to survive the Permian–Triassic extinction event. The rich diversity within different anomodont genera indicates a range of dental specializations that implies they utilized a variety of food processing mechanisms including modified jaw muscles, jaw joints, and teeth morphology and distribution. A feature that extends across most of the anomodont clade is jaw articulation that allowed for anterior-posterior movement of jaw for slicing.

On the basis of converging faunal evidence and comparison to other regions, the Xidagou Formation has been considered to be Middle Permian and home to the oldest therapsid fauna, suggesting that anomodonts had a Laurasian rather than a Gondwanan origin.

== See also ==
- List of therapsids
