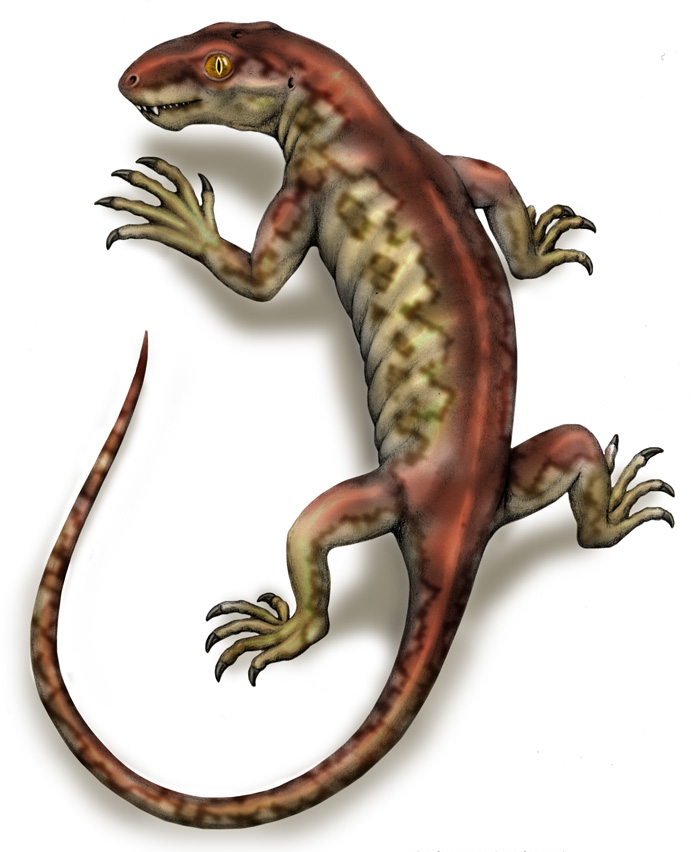
- Galepus jouberti

Scientific classification
- Domain: Eukaryota
- Kingdom: Animalia
- Phylum: Chordata
- Clade: Synapsida
- Clade: Therapsida
- Suborder: †Anomodontia
- Clade: †Chainosauria
- Genus: †Galepus; Broom, 1910

Type species
- Galepus jouberti Broom, 1910

= Galepus =

Galepus Temporal range: Permian

Extinct genus of therapsids

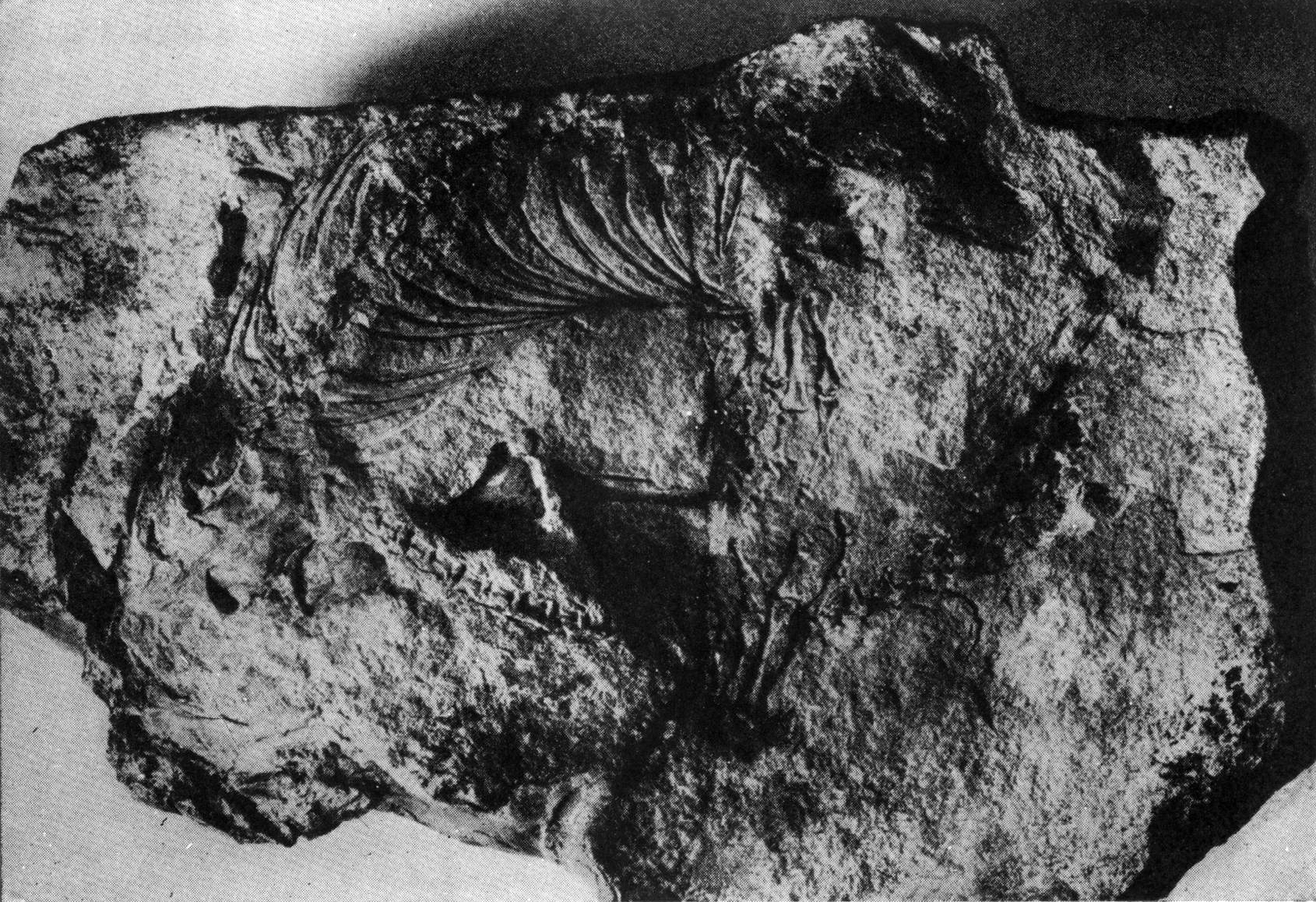
Galepus jouberti fossil, specimen 5541

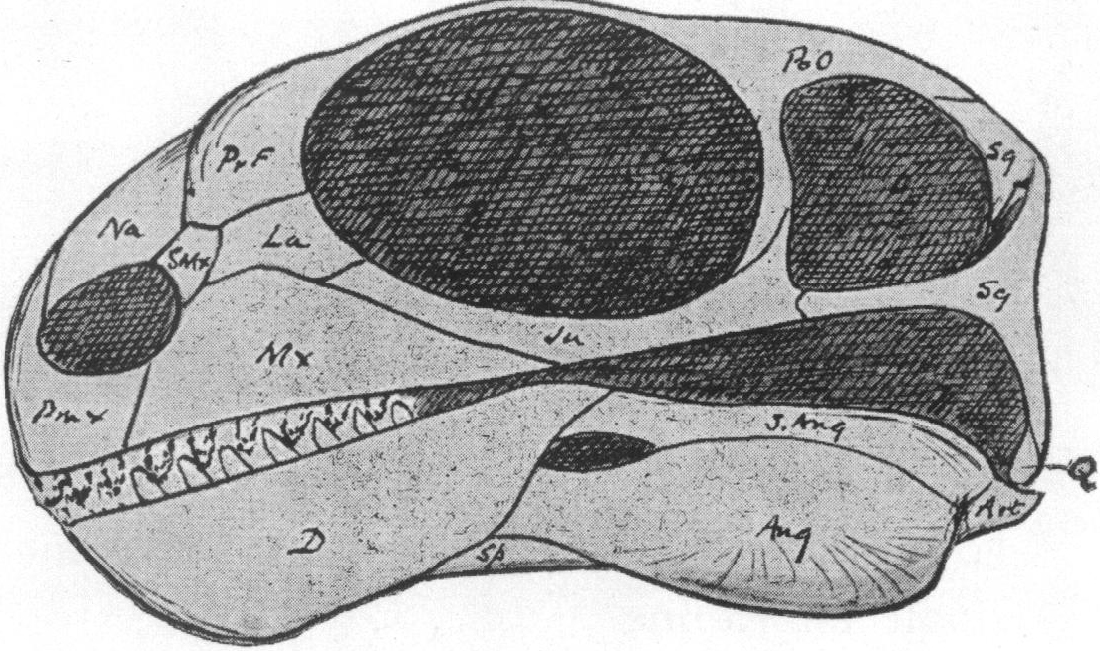
Galepus jouberti skull restoration, specimen 5541

Galepus is an extinct genus of anomodont therapsids.

== See also ==
- List of therapsids
