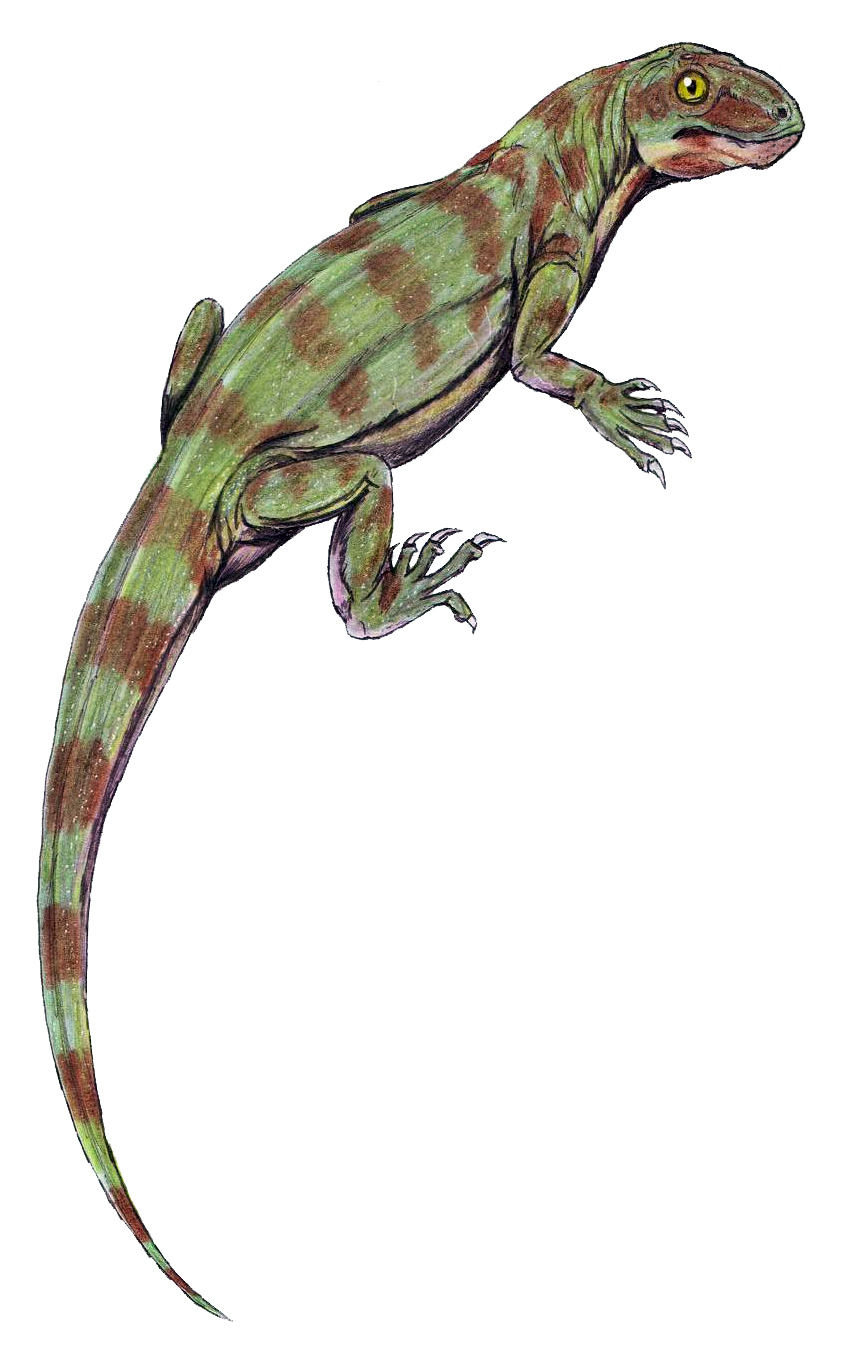

Scientific classification
- Domain: Eukaryota
- Kingdom: Animalia
- Phylum: Chordata
- Clade: Synapsida
- Clade: Therapsida
- Suborder: †Anomodontia
- Clade: †Chainosauria
- Genus: †Galechirus; Broom, 1907

Species
- G. scholtzi Broom, 1907 (type); G. whaitsi Broom, 1913

= Galechirus =

Galechirus Temporal range: Late Permian

Extinct genus of therapsids

Galechirus is an extinct genus of anomodont therapsids. It was about 30 cm (1 ft) long.

== Description ==
Galechirus was lizard-like in appearance. It is considered to be a dicynodont by some paleontologists; others think Galechirus is a younger form of a larger therapsid. Judging from its teeth, it was an insectivore.

== See also ==
- List of therapsids
