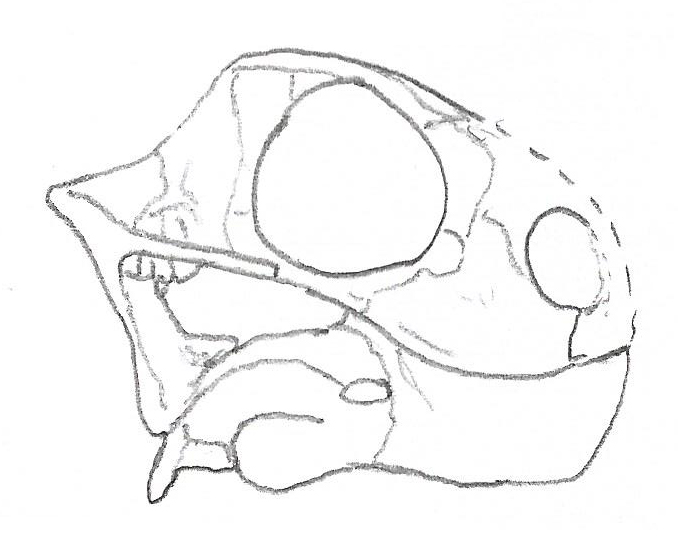
- Galeops skull

Scientific classification
- Kingdom: Animalia
- Phylum: Chordata
- Clade: Synapsida
- Clade: Therapsida
- Clade: †Anomodontia
- Clade: †Chainosauria
- Genus: †Galeops; Broom, 1912

= Galeops =

Galeops Temporal range: Permian

Extinct genus of therapsids

Galeops is an extinct genus of anomodont therapsids from the Middle-Late Permian of South Africa. It was described by Robert Broom in 1912. Some cladistic analyses have recovered it as closely related to dicynodonts.

== See also ==
- List of therapsids
