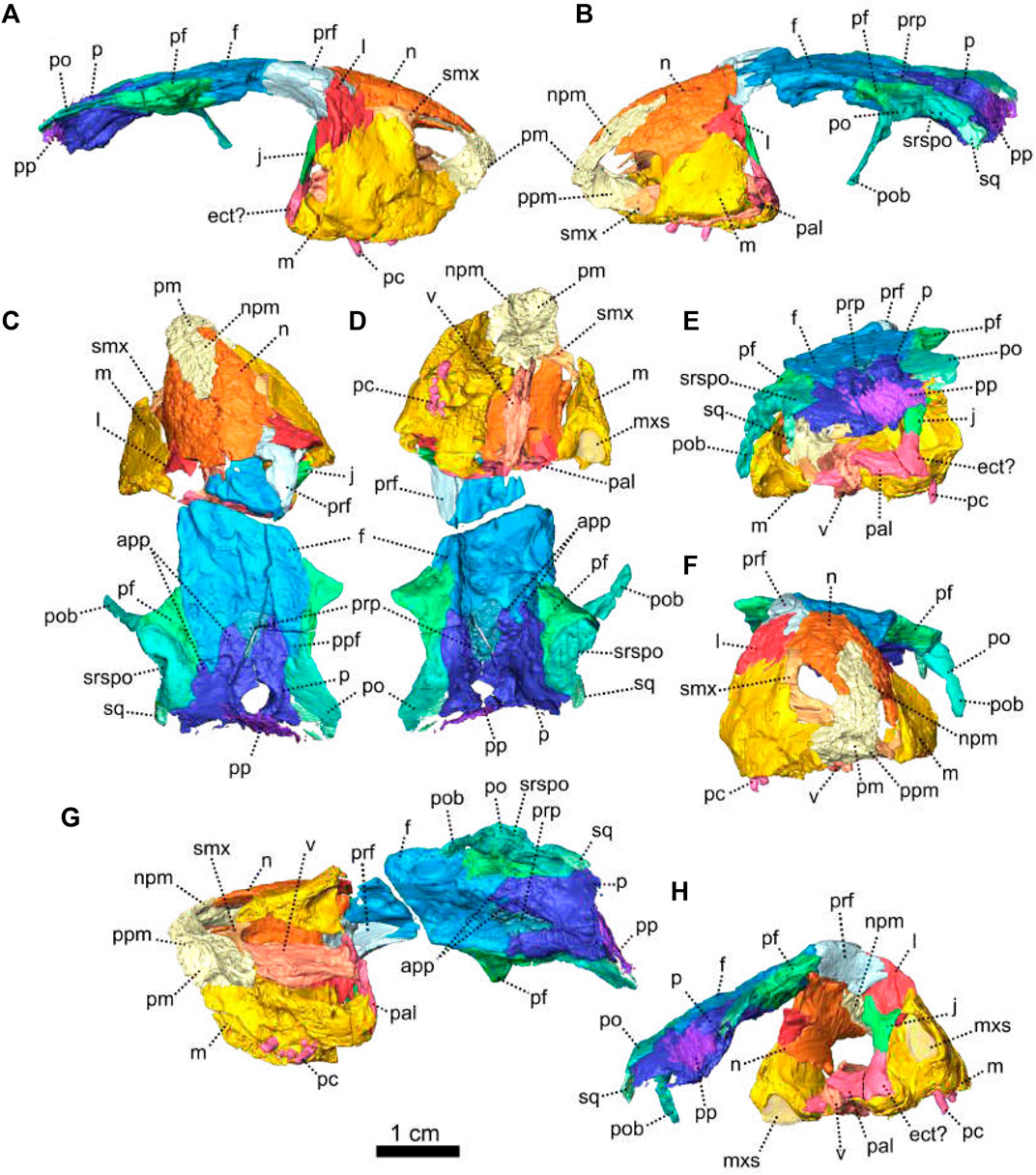
- Digital renders of the snout and skull roof of the holotype of Nyaphulia oelofseni (NMQR 2913)

Scientific classification
- Kingdom: Animalia
- Phylum: Chordata
- Clade: Synapsida
- Clade: Therapsida
- Clade: †Anomodontia
- Clade: †Dicynodontia
- Genus: †Nyaphulia; Duhamel et al., 2024
- Species: †N. oelofseni

Binomial name
- †Nyaphulia oelofseni (Rubidge, 1990)

Synonyms
- †Eodicynodon oelofseni Rubidge, 1990

= Nyaphulia =

Nyaphulia Temporal range: Middle Permian, Wordian ~266.9–264.4 Ma

Extinct genus of dicynodonts

Nyaphulia is an extinct genus of dicynodont therapsid from the middle Permian of South Africa, containing only the type species N. oelofseni. The generic name is in honour of John Nyaphuli of the National Museum of Bloemfontein, who contributed extensively to South African palaeontology and discovered the holotype specimen of Nyaphulia in 1982. Nyaphulia was initially named as a second species of the basal dicynodont Eodicynodon by Professor Bruce Rubidge in 1990 as E. oelofseni, named after his mentor in palaeontology and geology Dr. Burger Oelofsen.

Phylogenetic analyses since then consistently found "E." oelofseni to be more basal than the type species of Eodicynodon, rather than its sister taxon, which researchers suggested indicated it should belong to a distinct genus. "E." oelofseni would be named as the new genus Nyaphulia in 2024, following a thorough redescription of its material after it was CT-scanned and modelled digitally.

Nyaphulia has a mix of features of both earlier anomodonts and dicynodonts. Like early anomodonts, it still has no tusks or secondary palate and a laterally exposed septomaxilla bone around the nose, but like other dicynodonts it has no teeth in its premaxilla or at the tip of the dentary, a lateral dentary shelf, and reduced transverse wings of the pterygoid. Nyaphulia then represents a transitional stage in dicynodont evolution, demonstrating the order in which dicynodont traits such as beaks and tusks evolved.

== History of discovery ==
The holotype specimen of Nyaphulia, NMQR 2913, was discovered in October 1982 by John Nyaphuli from the National Museum in Bloemfontein, South Africa. It was discovered on Botterkraal Farm in the Prince Albert District of Western Cape, South Africa in rocks from the lower Abrahamskraal Formation. This locality belongs to the Eodicynodon Assemblage Zone biozone, which has not been firmly dated but is roughly constrained to between 266.9 and 264.7 million years old during the Wordian stage of the middle Permian period (Guadalupian).

NMQR 2913 consists of a partial skull, lower jaw and unidentifiable bones from the postcranial skeleton. The specimen was preserved in a calcareous nodule surrounding the skull, which prior to discovery had broken into four separate pieces leading to parts from the middle of the skull being weathered away. The specimen was prepared both in acid and mechanically by Nyaphuli, and was later described in 1990 by Professor Bruce Rubidge. Rubidge named the specimen the type of a new species of Eodicynodon that he coined Eodicynodon olefseni, after his mentor in South African palaeontology and geology, Dr. Burger Oelefsen. Since its initial description, the delicate skull has been broken several times and consequently some parts of the skull included in its original description have been lost. The skull has also been taphonomically distorted and damaged by compression during fossilisation, deforming portions of the snout, crushing the palate, and displacing the entire occiput up and to the side.

NMQR 2913 was digitally re-examined and then redescribed in a 2024 paper by Alienor Duhamel and colleagues after the specimen was previously CT-scanned. These techniques allowed Duhamel and colleagues to describe anatomical features that were previously inaccessible through traditional examination (such as sutures and the internal surface of the skull), and comparisons to the anatomy of Eodicynodon oosthuizeni confirmed that NMQR 2913 is not referable to Eodicynodon. Consequently, they erected the new genus Nyaphulia for "E." oelofseni, named in honour of John Nyaphuli for his extensive work on South African palaeontology in the Karoo, including the discovery of NMQR 2913 itself.

== Description ==
Like other dicynodonts and early anomodonts, the skull of Nyaphulia has a short snout and large temporal fenestra. The overall shape of its skull is more like those of earlier anomodonts, such as Patranomodon than later dicynodonts, with a slender construction and a rounded—rather than sloping—snout profile. Nyaphulia is notable among dicynodonts for lacking tusks and the associated caniniform processes entirely (the latter still being present even in almost all tuskless dicynodonts), with a level jaw margin like those of earlier anomodonts. However, unlike earlier anomodonts, both the premaxilla and the tip of the dentaries in the upper and lower jaws, respectively, are entirely toothless, suggesting Nyaphulia had a beak like other dicynodonts.

=== Skull ===
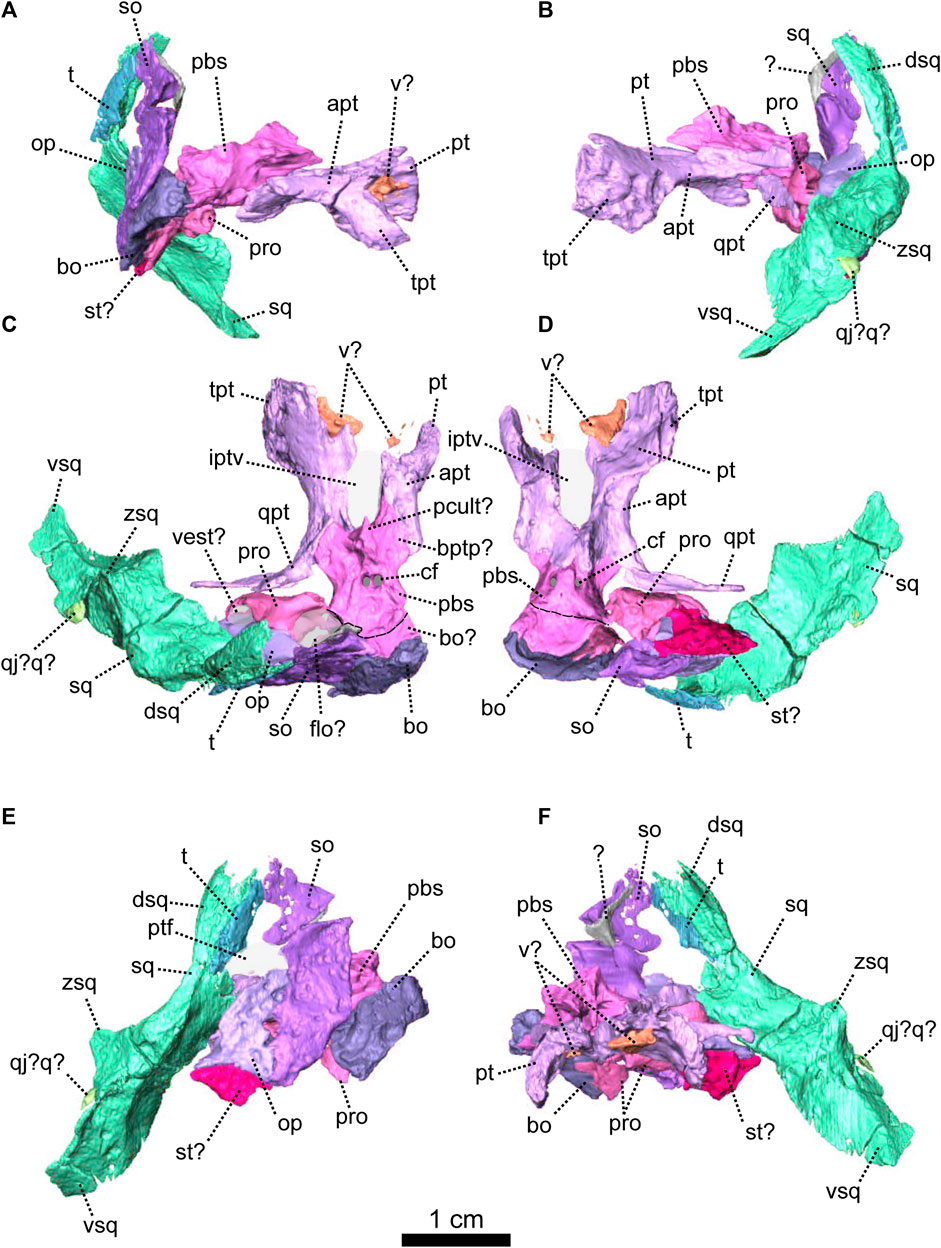
Digital renders of the occiput of the holotype of Nyaphulia oelofseni (NMQR 2913)

The premaxillae supporting the beak are paired, unlike all other dicynodonts where they are fused into a single bone—except for Eodicynodon. The palatal surface of the premaxillae extends back somewhat, however, it is short and the bony internal nostrils (choanae) still open near the front of the mouth at the level of the maxillary teeth. As such, Nyaphulia does not have the bony secondary palate found in later dicynodonts (wherein the choanae open further back than the tusks). The nasal processes of the premaxilla that wedge between the nasal bones are relatively long in Nyaphulia compared to Eodicynodon and Patranomodon. The septomaxilla—a bone found in the nose unique to synapsids in the fossil record—is also exposed on the lateral surface of the snout, unlike most later dicynodonts where it is restricted to within the nostril opening. The exposure is thin and tapers back to meet the lacrimal, running between the nasals above and the maxilla below.

The squamosal is incomplete and missing the entire zygomatic arch, however the preserved portion encompassing the rear of the temporal fenestra is curved forward and down and the ventral process beneath the zygomatic arch is slender and fairly straight. This resembles the condition in Patranomodon and other early anomodonts, rather than being thicker and folded back as in later dicynodonts. Like other anomodonts, Nyaphulia has a preparietal bone. However, it unusually does not form part of the border of the pineal foramen, which in Nyaphulia is rimmed entirely by the parietals. The orbital region of Nyaphulia is poorly preserved, missing most of the jugal bone, but what is preserved indicates that the orbits are not as rounded as those Eodicynodon and are more similar to those of Patranomodon. The postorbital bar is thin compared to Eodicynodon.

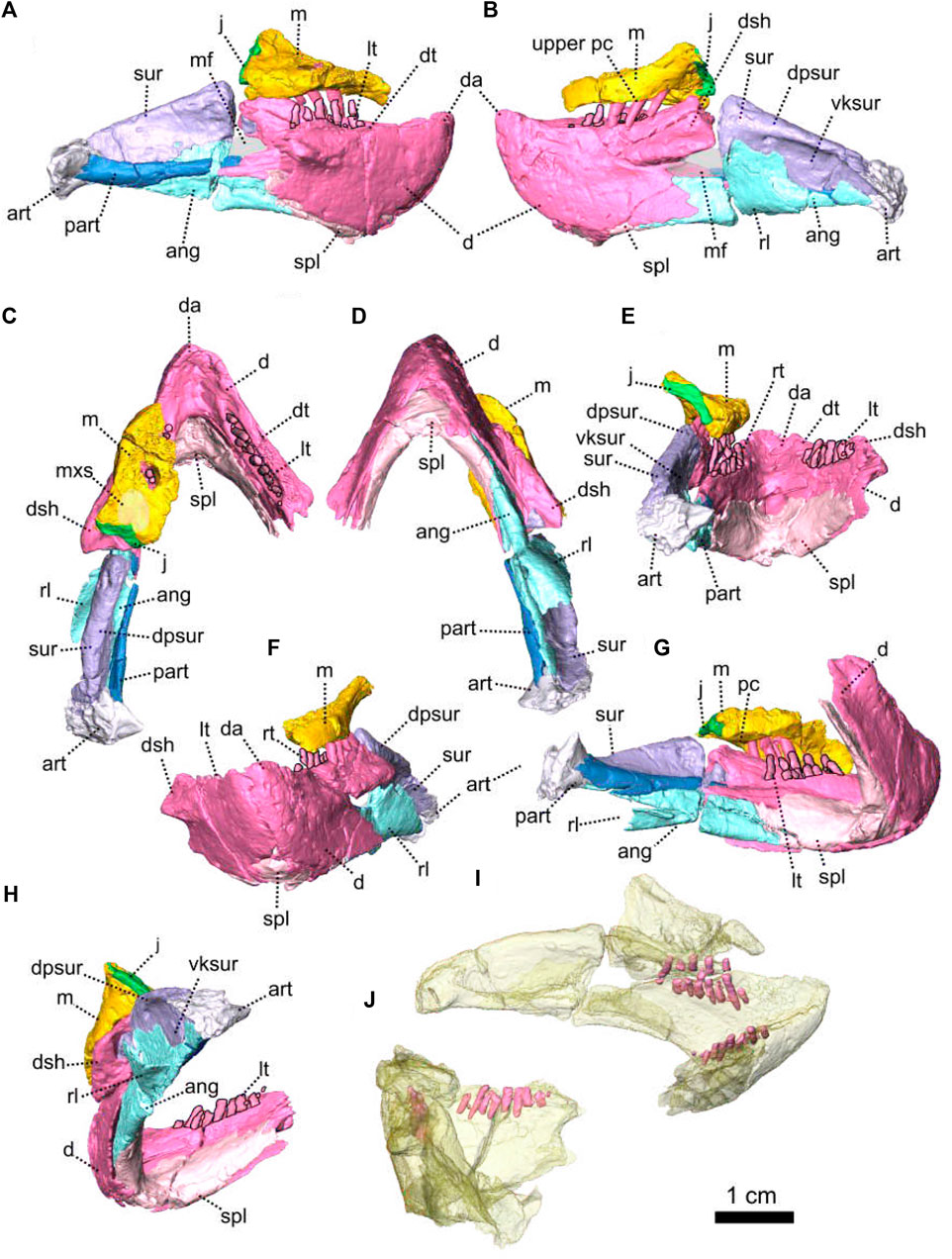
Digital renders of the mandibles of the holotype of Nyaphulia oelofseni (NMQR 2913)

The palate of Nypahulia is characteristic of dicynodonts. The transverse flange of the pterygoid bone is directed anteriorly as in later dicynodonts, rather than laterally to the side as in earlier anomodonts and other therapsids. The transverse flange also has a very prominent and bulbous palatal keel, developed more strongly than in other dicynodonts apart from Eodicynodon. By contrast, the shape of the parabasisphenoid flooring the braincase is more like that of Patranomodon and earlier anomodonts.

=== Jaws and teeth ===
Unlike the paired premaxillae, the dentary tips of the lower jaw are fused into a single element at their symphysis. Like later dicynodonts, the dentary tip is toothless with flat dentary tables on either side and a prominent lateral dentary shelf above the mandibular fenestra. This shelf would have served as an attachment point for the forward slip of jaw musculature that allowed dicynodonts to pull the lower jaw backwards to chew. Like some other dicynodonts, the dentary tip is curved upwards and so appears hooked from the side. Unlike Eodicynodon but like other dicynodonts, it lacks a coronoid eminence on the rear of the lower jaw.

The teeth of Nyaphulia are homodont and consist entirely of small, peg-like teeth slanted forwards in the jaw. This is unlike most other therapsids but similar to other early anomodonts such as Patranomodon and Galeops. As preserved, each maxilla has at least three teeth, potentially up to six (although some of these may be replacement teeth), and the dentaries at least eight teeth each. The maxillary teeth are placed entirely behind the openings for the nostrils (equivalent to the position of the tusks in Eodicynodon), and the dentary teeth are similarly far back from the dentary tips, leaving the jaw tips toothless. Rubidge (1990) reported nutrient foramina at the dentary tip, associated with a keratinous covering, though Duhamel et al. (2024) did not identify them.

== Classification ==
Rubidge (1990) originally referred Nyaphulia to the genus Eodicynodon on the basis of shared plesiomorphic (ancestrally present) characteristics that are also absent in any later dicynodonts. These are namely the unfused premaxillae and vomers and the large, bulbous palatal keels of the transverse pterygoid flanges. Rubidge (1990) nonetheless recognised it at least as a distinct species ("E." oelofseni), primarily on the basis of the number and position of the maxillary teeth and the lack of canine tusks. Other researchers, such as Gillian King, accepted Rubidge's referral of "E." oelofseni to Eodicynodon. However, early phylogenetic analyses of dicynodont relationships notably did not actually include "E." oelofseni, and only E. oosthuizeni was used to analyse the genus (e.g. Modesto et al., 1999; Modesto & Rubidge, 2000).

The referral of "E." oelofseni to Eodicynodon was first questioned in 2003 by Modesto and colleagues after testing its own phylogenetic relationships for the first time together with E. oosthuizeni. From their results, they argued that there was no compelling reason to believe they were each other's closest relatives and that E. oosthuizeni has much more in common with later dicynodonts, and therefore that "E." oelofseni likely represented a distinct taxon. This view has been supported by later researchers and upheld by further analyses, but a formal reassignment was avoided until it could be fully redescribed, accomplished by Duhamel and colleagues in 2024.

=== Phylogeny ===
Nyaphulia has been included in numerous phylogenetic analyses of anomodonts as "Eodicynodon" oelofseni (e.g. Kammerer et al., 2011; Castanhinha et al. 2013). These analyses consistently found "E." oelofseni to be the basal-most dicynodont (as the group is defined) and not the sister-taxon to E. oosthuizeni, as would be expected of congeneric species.

Nyaphulia was re-coded by Duhamel and colleagues in 2024 based on the updated information on its cranial and endocranial anatomy. Because they were focused on these characteristics, they modified the phylogenetic dataset they used and removed all postcranial characteristics for the analysis, unlike most other analyses using the same dataset. They also removed many derived dicynodonts from the analysis too, except for those with known endocranial anatomy. They performed various types of phylogenetic analyses, including cladistic and Bayesian analyses, some of the first performed on therapsid relationships. As before, all of their analyses consistently found Nyaphulia to be more basal than Eodicynodon but closer to other dicynodonts than any of the other early anomodonts, whose relationships varied considerably between analyses.

The following phylogeny is modified from one of the Bayesian phylogenetic analysis Duhamel et al. (2024):

- Anomodontia
  - Biseridens
  - - Anomocephaloidea
      - Anomocephalus
      - Tiarajudens
    - - Venyukovioidea
        - Otsheria
        - - Suminia
          - Ulemica
      - Chainosauria
        - - Patranomodon
          - - Galechirus
            - - Galeops
              - Galepus
        - Dicynodontia
          - Nyaphulia
          - - Eodicynodon
            - - Colobodectes
              - - Lanthanostegus
                - - Pylaecephalidae
                  - More derived dicynodonts

Nyaphulia shares with other dicynodonts the absence of premaxillary teeth, forward-projecting transverse processes of the pterygoid with pterygoid keels, a lateral dentary shelf, and the absence of vertical lamina on the surangular of the lower jaw. At the same time, it differs from Eodicynodon and all other dicynodonts by the combination of lacking a tusk and caniniform process, absence of a secondary palate, lateral exposure of the septomaxilla, and a parabasisphenoid that reaches the interpterygoid vacuity—all features it shares with various earlier anomodonts. Nyaphulia therefore represents a transitional stage in the evolution of dicynodont characteristics.

== Palaeoecology ==
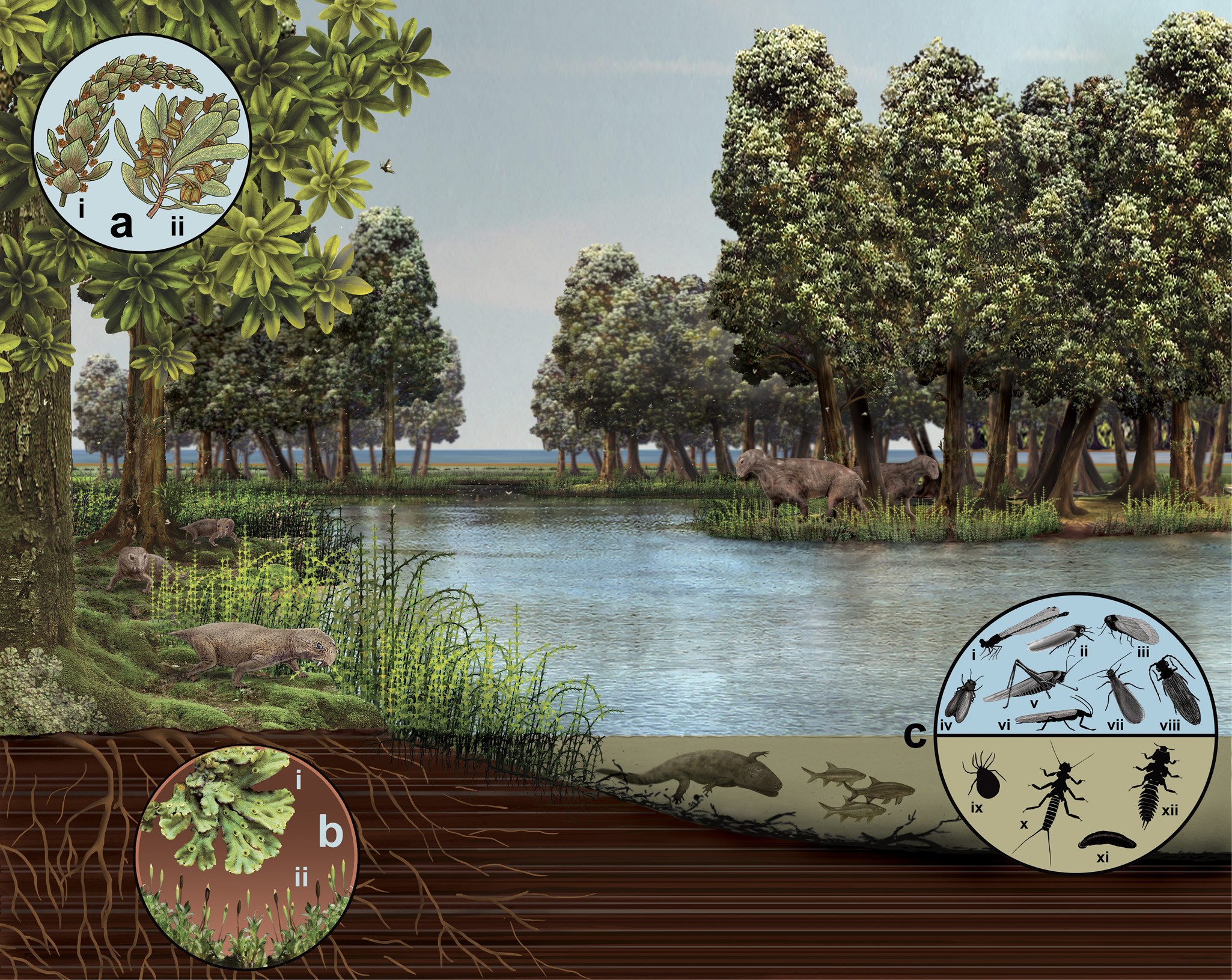
Palaeoenvironment reconstruction of the Eodicynodon Assemblage Zone, based on the Onder Karoo locality

Nyaphulia was part of the Eodicynodon Assemblage Zone (AZ), the oldest known faunal assemblage in the Beaufort Group of the Karoo, South Africa. Fossils are relatively rare in the Eodicynodon AZ and the fauna of the assemblage is poorly known compared to later zones, but includes a relatively diverse range of tetrapods nonetheless. Nyaphulia coexisted with two other small herbivorous anomodonts, the more basal Patranomodon and the tusked dicynodont Eodicynodon. Other therapsids included the much larger herbivorous tapinocephalian Tapinocaninus as well as several large predators: the anteosaur Australosyodon, the scylacosaurid therocephalian Eutheriodon, and a gorgonopsian of indeterminable affinity. Additionally, there are fossils of indeterminate temnospondyl amphibians and preserved scales of the fish Namaichthys, as well as freshwater bivalves comparable to Palaeanodonta.

The depositional environment of the Eodicynodon AZ was a subaerial deltaic plain and floodplain relatively close to the shoreline of the Ecca sea, with low sinuosity rivers draining from mountains to the south northwards into the sea. Over time, the plain built up and the shoreline progradated further to the north and northwest. Interchannel deposits indicate the presence of perennial lakes on the floodplains as well, which occasionally dried out but not for prolonged periods (unlike the playa lakes from later assemblage zones in the Beaufort Group). While animal fossils are scarce in the assemblage zone, plant remains are relatively abundant, namely of the woody seed plant Glossopteris and equisetales (horsetails), such as the large Schizoneura that grew in and around the rivers and lakes.
