= Abrahamskraal Formation =

Geological formation of the Beaufort Group in South Africa

- Stratigraphic range: Wordian-Capitanian; ~268–259 Ma
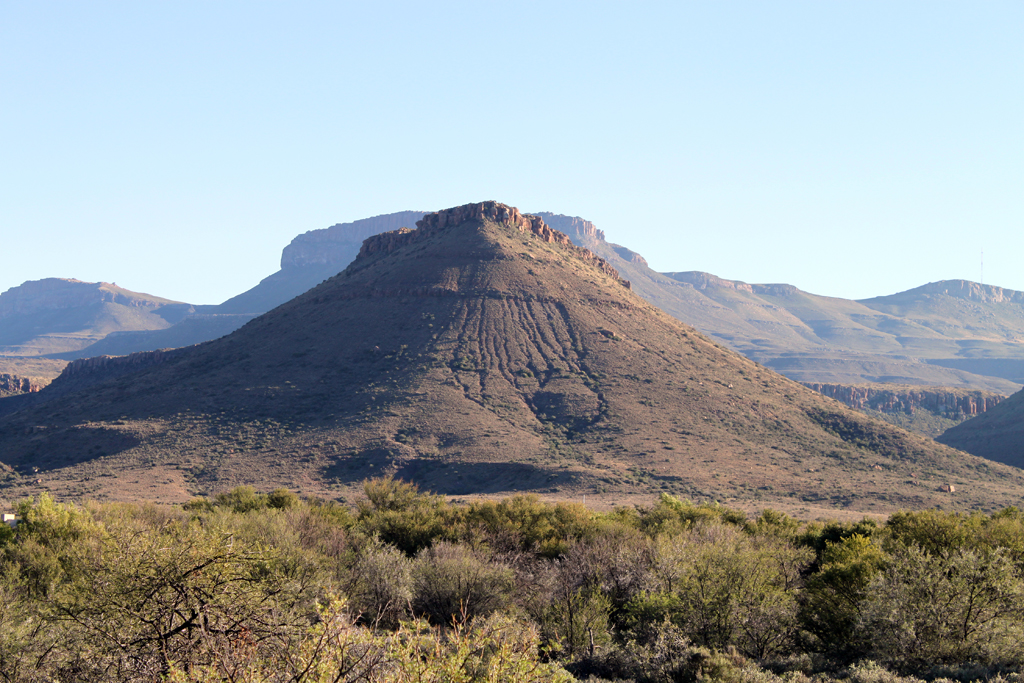
- Hill with outcropping Teekloof and Abrahamskraal Formations
- Type: Geological formation
- Unit of: Beaufort Group
- Sub-units: Tapinocephalus Assemblage Zone, Eodicynodon Assemblage Zone
- Underlies: Teekloof Formation
- Overlies: Ecca Group
- Thickness: up to 2,565 m (8,415 ft)

Lithology
- Primary: Mudstone, sandstone
- Other: Siltstone

Location
- Coordinates: 31°24′S 23°06′E
- Approximate paleocoordinates: 59.9°S 38.9°W
- Region: Northern, Western & Eastern Cape
- Country: South Africa

Type section
- Named for: Abrahams Kraal 29 (farm), 18 km south of Leeu-Gamka
- Named by: A.W. Keyser, P.J. Rossouw & Lieuwe Dirk Boonstra
- Abrahamskraal Formation (South Africa)

The Abrahamskraal Formation is a geological formation and is found in numerous localities in the Northern Cape, Western Cape, and the Eastern Cape of South Africa. It is the lowermost formation of the Adelaide Subgroup of the Beaufort Group, a major geological group that forms part of the greater Karoo Supergroup. It represents the first fully terrestrial geological deposits of the Karoo Basin. Outcrops of the Abrahamskraal Formation are found from the small town Middelpos in its westernmost localities, then around Sutherland, the Moordenaarskaroo north of Laingsburg, Williston, Fraserburg, Leeu-Gamka, Loxton, and Victoria West in the Western Cape and Northern Cape. In the Eastern Cape outcrops are known from Rietbron, north of Klipplaat and Grahamstown, and also southwest of East London.

== Geology ==
The Abrahamskraal Formation comprises the majority of the Middle Permian Beaufort sequence, and are thought to range between 268 - 259 million years in age. The lowermost deposits of the Abrahamskraal Formation found in the Eastern Cape until recently were named the Koonap Formation, but these outcrops have been amalgamated into the Abrahamskraal Formation due to recent stratigraphic and biostratigraphic research. The Abrahamskraal Formation incorporates the entire Tapinocephalus Assemblage Zone in its upper sections and the entire Eodicynodon Assemblage Zone its lowermost southern deposits. In the west and northerly deposits the Abrahamskraal Formation overlies the Waterford Formation and the Middleton Formation in the south, both formations containing the uppermost deposits of the Ecca Group. The lower boundary of the Tapinocephalus Assembalge Zone is dated to 264.4 million years ago,while the boundary between Eosimops-Glanosuchus and Diictodon-Styracocephalus subzones is dated to 262 million years ago. The Karelskraal Member is dated to 261 to 260 million years ago and is timed to the onset of the Capitanian mass extinction event.

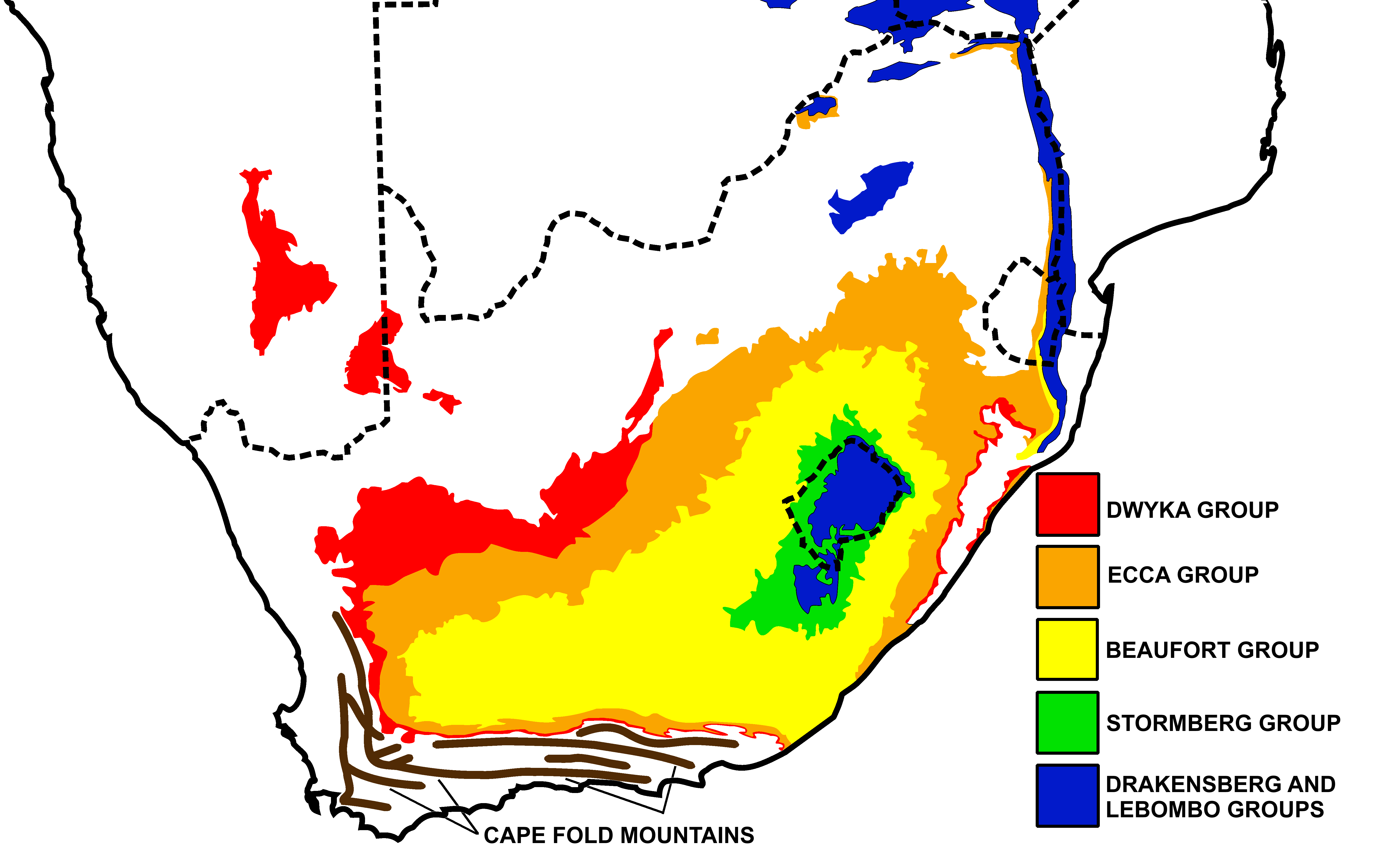
A simplified geological map of the outcrops of Karoo Supergroup rocks in Southern Africa. The Beaufort Group is represented by the yellow key on the map

The rocks of the Abrahamskraal Formation comprise mainly greenish-grey to blueish-grey mudstone coupled with rarer instances of greyish-red, reddish-brown or purple mudstones. These include subordinate greenish-grey, fine-grained sandstones which are normally observed in fining upward cycles. The sandstones vary in thickness from several metres to several tens of metres in some localities. Siltstones are also found interbedded with the mudstone beds. The presence of these rocks reveal much about the past environment that they were deposited in. They were formed by sedimentary material being deposited in the Karoo Basin - a retro-arc foreland basin - by vast, low-energy alluvial plains flowing northwards from the south. The lowermost deposits are considered to be deltaic and grade laterally into the underlying Ecca Group deposits in its southern localities. Deposits grade steadily younger in the northeast where the sedimentary facies turn fully terrestrial. The greenish-grey mudstones are usually associated with the deltaic sedimentary facies while the redder mudstones with the terrestrial.

All sedimentary rocks of the Karoo Basin were transported downhill from the south in the shadow of the rising Gondwanide mountain range. The Gondwanides were the result of tectonic uplift that had previously begun to take course due to subduction of the Palaeo-pacific plate beneath the Gondwanan Plate. Orogenic pulses from the growing Gondwanides mountain chain and associated subduction created accommodation space for sedimentation in the Karoo Basin where the deposits of the Abrahamskraal Formation and all succeeding deposits of the Karoo Basin were deposited over millions of years.

== Paleontological significance ==
The Abrahamskraal Formation is highly fossiliferous and well known for its biozone assemblages of therapsid fossils. The Eodicynodon and Tapinocephalus Assemblage Zones to which this geological formation incorporates preserve the first appearance of the earliest dicynodonts, dinocephalians, biarmosuchians, therocephalians, gorgonopsians, and pareiasaurian parareptiles. The upper sections of this formation document the rise of and diversification of the dinocephalians. The dinocephalians subsequently went extinct at the contact of the Abrahamskraal Formation with the overlying Teekloof Formation. The basal pelycosaur synapsid species, Elliotsmithia longiceps, has also been found in the deposits of this formation. The presence of this basal synapsid is indicative of this geological formations significance. For decades, paleontologists have puzzled over what has been termed Olsen's Gap, which is used to describe the evolutionary gap in the tetrapod fossil record between the appearance of the more derived therapsids and their ancestors, the pelycosaurs. The rocks of the Abrahamskraal Formation and its geological correlates abroad hold the promise of that fossil gap being bridged through future research endeavors in the years to come. More notable fossil species include the dicynodont Diictodon feliceps which first appears in the upper sections of this formation, remaining ubiquitous until the Permian-Triassic boundary. Finally, fossils of temnospondyl amphibians such as of Rhinesuchus, the fish Namaichthys, invertebrate fossils of molluscs, invertebrate trackways and burrows, vertebrate footprints of therapsids, and a variety of plant fossils such as Dadoxylon, Equisetum modderdriftensis, Schizoneura africana, and several different species of Glossopteris have been recovered.

Among the species found in the Abrahamskraal Formation is Moschops Capensis

== Paleobiota ==
Color key: Taxon / Reclassified taxon / Taxon falsely reported as present / Dubious taxon or junior synonym / Ichnotaxon / Ootaxon / Morphotaxon

Notes
Uncertain or tentative taxa are in small text
~~crossed out~~ taxa are discredited.

=== Arthropods ===
Arthropods of the Abrahamskraal Formation
Taxa	Species	Locality	Assemblage Zone	Material	Notes	Images
Afropereboria	A. magnifica	Onder Karoo		A forewing and hind wing specimen	A hemipteran insects, originate from pereboriidae	
Afrozygopteron	A. inexpectatus	Onder Karoo		A distal fragment of an insect wing	A luiseiidae	
Colubrosopterum	C. karooensis	Onder Karoo		A forewing	A Grylloblattida from the family Liomopteridae	
Karooprosbole	K. magnifica	Onder Karoo		A tegmen		

=== Amphibians ===
Amphibians of the Abrahamskraal Formation
Taxa	Species	Locality	Assemblage Zone	Material	Notes	Images
Rhinesuchus	R. tenuceps	Farm Stinkfontein, Prince Albert District	Tapinocephalus A-Z.	A skull associated with a partial left mandibular ramus.	A temnospondyl amphibian.	
Rhinesuchus	R. whaitsi	Leeu-Gamka, Prince Albert District	Tapinocephalus A-Z.	A basicranium, seven fragments of the middle portion of the left hemi-mandible, and multiple skull fragments.	A temnospondyl amphibian.	

=== Fish ===
Actinopterygian

Actinopterygians of the Abrahamskraal Formation
Taxa	Species	Locality	Assemblage Zone	Material	Notes	Images
Bethesdaichthys	B. kitchingi	Blourug farm, Victoria West.	Tapinocephalus A-Z	A preserved skull.	An actinopterygian fish.	
Blourugia	B. seeleyi	Blourug farm, Victoria West.	Tapinocephalus A-Z	A partial skeleton.	An actinopterygian fish.	
Westlepis	W. kempeni	Blourug farm, Victoria West	Tapinocephalus A-Z		An actinopterygian fish.	

=== Reptiles ===
==== Sauropsida ====
Sauropsids of the Abrahamskraal Formation
Taxa	Species	Locality	Assemblage Zone	Material	Notes	Images
Australothyris	A. smithi	Beukesplaas farm	Upper part of Tapinocephalus A-Z	A skull and portions of the rest of the skeleton	A procolophonomorph parareptile.	
Bradysaurus	B. baini	Prince Albert, Leeu Gamka, Hottentotsrivier Farm, Leeurivier, Mynhardtskraal, Groot Kruidfortein, Zwarts Siding, Sutherland, and Knoffelfortein.	Tapinocephalus A-Z	A complete skull and separate lower jaw with a complete postcranial skeleton consisting of a complete shoulder girdle and pelvis, a complete vertebral column with few missing at the end of the caudal vertebrae. The right fore and hind limbs are complete. The left humerus, radius, ulna, femur, tibia, and fibula are partially preserved.	A pareiasaur.	
Bradysaurus	B. seeleyi	Prince Albert, Leeu Gamka, Hottentotsrivier Farm, Leeurivier, Mynhardtskraal, Groot Kruidfortein, Zwarts Siding, Sutherland, and Knoffelfortein.	Tapinocephalus A-Z	A partial skeleton consists of a complete skull, lower jaw, partial vertebral column, some ribs, osteoderms, and parts of girdles.	A pareiasaur.	
Broomia	B perplexa	Hottentotsrivier Farm	Middle part of Tapinocephalus Assemblage Zone	A partial skeleton (almost complete; skull lacks dorsal roof).	A millerettid reptile	
Embrithosaurus	E. schwarzi	Hoogeveld farm.	Tapinocephalus A-Z	Distorted skull with the occluded lower jaw, vertebrae 1 to 27 with articulated osteoderms, two small articulated caudal vertebrae, partial left scapulocoracoid, cleithrum, left and right clavicle, and interclavicle, complete right humerus, partial left humerus, complete right radius, partial left radius, both ulnae complete, both femora complete, both tibia complete, right fibula, partial left fibula, complete pelvis, two digits of the forelimb and two digits of the hindlimb	A pareiasaur.	
Eunotosaurus	E. africanus	De bad farm, Prince Albert, Boesmanrivier and Rietfortien	Upper Tapinocephalus A-Z and parts of Pristerognathus A-Z.	Fossilized ribbones.	An early relative of reptile.	

=== Synapsids ===
==== Therapsids ====
===== Anomodonts =====
====== Chainosauria ======
Chainosaurs of the Abrahamskraal Formation
Taxa	Species	Locality	Assemblage Zone	Material	Notes	Images
Galechirus	G. scholtzl	Victoria West	Tapinocephalus A-Z.	A partial skeleton	An insectivorous anomodont.	
Patranomodon	P. nyaphulii	Prince Albert	Eodicynodon A-Z	A fossilized skull	A rare genus of anomodont.	

====== Dicynodontia ======
Dicynodonts of the Abrahamskraal Formation
Taxa	Species	Locality	Assemblage Zone	Material	Notes	Images
Brachyprosopus	B. broomi	Beukesplaas	Tapinocephalus A-Z	A skull.	A dicynodont.	Brachyprosopus broomi Diictodon Feliceps Emydops Arctatus Eodicynodon oosthuizeni Eosimops newtoni Nyaphulia oelofseni Robertia broomiana
Colobodectes	C. cluveri	Keerom farm, Kruidfontein farm, Bastardsfontein farm, and Altringham farm.	Eodicynodon and Tapinocephalus A-Z	A skull lacking zygomatic arches and postorbital bars	A dicynodont.	Brachyprosopus broomi Diictodon Feliceps Emydops Arctatus Eodicynodon oosthuizeni Eosimops newtoni Nyaphulia oelofseni Robertia broomiana
Diictodon	D. feliceps	Prince Albert.	Tapinocephalus A-Z	Several skeletal specimens.	A pylaecephalid dicynodont.	Brachyprosopus broomi Diictodon Feliceps Emydops Arctatus Eodicynodon oosthuizeni Eosimops newtoni Nyaphulia oelofseni Robertia broomiana
Emydops	E. arctatus	Beaufort West and Prince Albert.	Either Tapinocephalus A-Z or Pristerognathus A-Z.	A partial skull	A dicynodont.	Brachyprosopus broomi Diictodon Feliceps Emydops Arctatus Eodicynodon oosthuizeni Eosimops newtoni Nyaphulia oelofseni Robertia broomiana
Eodicynodon	E. oosthuizeni	Tuinkraal and Zwartskraal farm, Prince Albert district	Tapinocephalus A-Z	Postcranial skeleton.	A dicynodont.	Brachyprosopus broomi Diictodon Feliceps Emydops Arctatus Eodicynodon oosthuizeni Eosimops newtoni Nyaphulia oelofseni Robertia broomiana
Eosimops	E. newtoni	Victoria West.	Tapinocephalus A-Z.	several skull specimens and one complete skeleton.	A pylaecephalid dicynodont.	Brachyprosopus broomi Diictodon Feliceps Emydops Arctatus Eodicynodon oosthuizeni Eosimops newtoni Nyaphulia oelofseni Robertia broomiana
Nyaphulia	N. oelofseni	Botterkraal farm	Eodicynodon A-Z.	Partial skull, jaws, and teeth.	A dicynodont, formally named E. oelofseni.	Brachyprosopus broomi Diictodon Feliceps Emydops Arctatus Eodicynodon oosthuizeni Eosimops newtoni Nyaphulia oelofseni Robertia broomiana
Robertia	R. broomiana	Klein Koedoeskop, Beaufort West.	Lower part of the Tapinocephalus A-Z.	Partial skull and postcranial skeleton.	A small herbivorous dicynodont.	Brachyprosopus broomi Diictodon Feliceps Emydops Arctatus Eodicynodon oosthuizeni Eosimops newtoni Nyaphulia oelofseni Robertia broomiana

===== Biarmosuchia =====
Biarmosuchians of the Abrahamskraal Formation
Taxa	Species	Locality	Assemblage Zone	Material	Notes	Images
Hipposaurus	H. boonstrai	Beaufort west and Riet Fontein	Tapinocephalus A-Z	A single skull.	A hipposaurid therapsid.	
Hipposaurus	H. brinki	Beaufort west and Riet Fontein	Tapinocephalus A-Z	A preserved skull.	A hipposaurid therapsid.	
Impumlophantsi	I. boonstrai	Palmietfontein portion (plot 57) of Kruidfontein farm, Prince Albert District	Tapinocephalus A-Z	The preorbital region of the skull and articulated lower jaw and a partial vertebral column and pelvis	A Biarmosuchian.	
Nierkoppia	N. brucei	Farm Stellenboschvlei	Tapinocephalus A-Z.	A relatively well-preserved fragment of skull roof, preserving the interorbital and inter-temporal regions and dorso-medial portion of the occiput.	A proburnetiine burnetiamorph.	

===== Dinocephalian =====
====== Anteosauridae ======
Anteosaurs of the Abrahamskraal Formation
Taxa	Species	Locality	Assemblage Zone	Material	Notes	Images
Anteosaurus	A. magnificus	Beaufort West, Prince Albert, and Laingsburg	Tapinocephalus A-Z.	Several complete skulls, dentition, and partial postcranial skeleton.	A large carnivorous anteosaur	framless
Australosyodon	A. nyaphuli	Prince Albert and Tuinkraal	Eodicynodon A-Z.	A skull and mandible with a preserved left side.	An syodontinae anteosaur	

====== Styracocephalidae ======
Styracocephalids of the Abrahamskraal Formation
Taxa	Species	Locality	Assemblage Zone	Material	Notes	Images
Styracocephalus	S. platyrhynchus	Rietfontein, Prince Albert, and Boesmansrivier	Tapinocephalus A-Z.	Complete skull consists of jaws, palate, and dentition.	A dinocephalian therapsid.	

====== Tapinocephalidae ======
Tapinocephalians of the Abrahamskraal Formation
Taxa	Species	Locality	Assemblage Zone	Material	Notes	Images
Criocephalosaurus	C. vanderbyli	Prince Albert	Lower and Middle Tapinocephalus A-Z.	A skull cap consists of the frontals, parietals, postfrontals, and one pre-frontal.	A tapinocephalian.	
Keratocephalus	K. moloch	Prince Albert, Leeu Gamka, and Buffelsvlei.	Tapinocephalus A-Z.	Variable skulls and postcrania.	A tapinocephalian.	
Mormosaurus	M. seeleyi	Gouph tract	Tapinocephalus A-Z.	A partial skull.	A Tapinocephalian.	
Moschops	M. capensis	De Cypher Farm and Hottentotsrivier.	Tapinocephalus A-Z.	Several skeletal specimens consist of skulls and postcranial skeletons.	A subaquatic tapinocephalian.	
Moschops	M. koupensis	De Cypher Farm and Hottentotsrivier.	Tapinocephalus A-Z.	Several skeletal specimens consist of skulls and postcranial skeletons.	A subaquatic tapinocephalian.	
Moschops	M. romeri	De Cypher Farm and Hottentotsrivier.	Tapinocephalus A-Z.	Several skeletal specimens consist of skulls and postcranial skeletons.	A subaquatic tapinocephalian.	
Phocosaurus	P. megischion	Boesmansrivier and Vers Fontein/Jan Willem Fontein.	Tapinocephalus A-Z.	A partial skull.	A Tapinocephalian.	
Tapinocaninus	T. pamelae	Modderdrift farm	Eodicynodon A-Z.	Paratypes consist of several skulls with few post-cranial skeletons.	A Tapinocephalian.	
Tapinocephalus	T. atherstonei	Boesmanshoek and Prince Albert	Lower, Middle, and Upper part of the Tapinocephalus A-Z.	A skull and postcranial elements.	A giant herbivorous Tapinocephalian.	
Struthiocephalus	S. whaitsi	Prince Albert	Lower to Middle Tapinocephalus A-Z.	A partial skull.	A Tapinocephalian.	

====== Titanosuchidae ======
Titanosuchids of the Abrahamskraal Formation
Taxa	Species	Locality	Assemblage Zone	Material	Notes	Images
Jonkeria	J. boonstai	Farm Uitkyk, Leeu-Gamka, Groot kruidfontein, Prince Albert, and Vers Fontein.	Tapinocephalus A-Z.	A skull and humerus.	A giant omnivorous titanosuchid	
Jonkeria	J. ingens	Farm Uitkyk, Leeu-Gamka, Groot kruidfontein, Prince Albert, and Vers Fontein.	Tapinocephalus A-Z.	A complete skull.	A giant omnivorous titanosuchid	
Jonkeria	J. haughtoni	Farm Uitkyk, Leeu-Gamka, Groot kruidfontein, Prince Albert, and Vers Fontein.	Tapinocephalus A-Z.	A crushed skull.	A giant omnivorous titanosuchid	
Jonkeria	J. koupensis	Farm Uitkyk, Leeu-Gamka, Groot kruidfontein, Prince Albert, and Vers Fontein.	Tapinocephalus A-Z.	A complete pelvis bone.	A giant omnivorous titanosuchid	
Jonkeria	J. parva	Farm Uitkyk, Leeu-Gamka, Groot kruidfontein, Prince Albert, and Vers Fontein.	Tapinocephalus A-Z.	A femur, radius, small humerus, and tarsal.	A giant omnivorous titanosuchid	
Jonkeria	J. rossouwi	Farm Uitkyk, Leeu-Gamka, Groot kruidfontein, Prince Albert, and Vers Fontein.	Tapinocephalus A-Z.	The holotype consists of postcranial skeletons.	A giant omnivorous titanosuchid	
Jonkeria	J. truculenta	Farm Uitkyk, Leeu-Gamka, Groot kruidfontein, Prince Albert, and Vers Fontein.	Tapinocephalus A-Z.	A skull and partial skeleton.	A giant omnivorous titanosuchid	
Jonkeria	J. vanderbyli	Farm Uitkyk, Leeu-Gamka, Groot kruidfontein, Prince Albert, and Vers Fontein.	Tapinocephalus A-Z.	A complete skull.	A giant omnivorous titanosuchid	
Titanosuchus	T. ferox	Beaufort West, Prince Albert, Mynhardskraal, Veldmansrivier, and Lammerskraal.	Tapinocephalus A-Z	Fragmentary jaws and post-crania that include two left humeri, femur, and two phalanges.	A carnivorous titanosuchid	

===== Gorgonopsia =====
A snout tip of an indeterminate gorgonopsian is known from the Eodicynodon Assemblage Zone.

Gorgonopsians of the Abrahamskraal Formation
Taxa	Species	Locality	Assemblage Zone	Material	Notes	Images
Aelurosaurus	A. felinus	Beaufort west.	Tapinocephalus A-Z.	A holotype preserved skull.	A gorgonopsian.	Aelurosaurus Eriphostoma Jirahgorgon
Aelurosaurus	A. whaitsi	Beaufort west.	Tapinocephalus A-Z.	A holotype preserved skull.	A gorgonopsian.	Aelurosaurus Eriphostoma Jirahgorgon
Cerdodon	C. tenuidens	Beaufort west.	Tapinocephalus A-Z.	A holotype consists of a crushed skull.	A gorgonopsian.	Aelurosaurus Eriphostoma Jirahgorgon
Eriphostoma	E. microdon	Prince Albert, Hottentotsrivier farm, and Mynhardtskraal.	Tapinocephalus A-Z.	Partial skull remains.	A gorgonopsian formally named Galesuchus gracilis.	Aelurosaurus Eriphostoma Jirahgorgon
Jirahgorgon	J. ceto	Wilgerbosfontein (Wilgerbos) farm	Tapinocephalus A-Z.	A complete skull and occluded lower jaw.	A phorcyid gorgonopsian.	Aelurosaurus Eriphostoma Jirahgorgon
Phorcys	P. dubei	Delportsrivier	Tapinocephalus A-Z.	A partial skull from the occiput (the back face of the skull) up to the orbits, including the basicranium (the floor of the skull beneath the braincase), an eroded upper surface preserving the intact pre parietal and portions of the surrounding frontals and parietal bones, with a broken left zygomatic arch and a left palatine displaced into the left orbit.	A phorycid gorgonopsian.	Aelurosaurus Eriphostoma Jirahgorgon

===== Therocephalia =====
Therocephalians of the Abrahamskraal Formation
Taxa	Species	Locality	Assemblage Zone	Material	Notes	Images
Alopecodon	A. priscus	Zeekoegat, Prince Albert.	Tapinocephalus A-Z	A crushed partial skull and lower jaws.	A therocephalian.	Alopecognathus Glanosuchus Lycosuchus
Alopecognathus	A. angusticeps	Beaufort West and Prince Albert.	Tapinocephalus A-Z.	Skull specimens.	A therocephalian.	Alopecognathus Glanosuchus Lycosuchus
Eutheriodon	E. vandenheeveri	Modderdrift, Prince Albert.	Eodicynodon A-Z.	A partial snout and lower jaws.	A scylacosaurid therocephalian.	Alopecognathus Glanosuchus Lycosuchus
Glanosuchus	G. macrops	Gioflok's Fontein, near Van der Byl's Iird in the Gouph	Eodicynodon A-Z.	A holotype consists of a partial skull.	A scylacosaurid therocephalian.	Alopecognathus Glanosuchus Lycosuchus
Hyaenasuchus	H. whaitsi	Rietfontein	Tapinocephalus A-Z.	A weathered skull.	A therocephalian.	Alopecognathus Glanosuchus Lycosuchus
Ictidosaurus	I. angusticeps	Beaufort West	Eodicynodon and Tapinocephalus A-Z.	A holotype preserved skull.	A scylacosaurid therocephalian.	Alopecognathus Glanosuchus Lycosuchus
Lycosuchus	L. vanderrieti	Prince Albert.	Tapinocephalus A-Z	Near-complete skull and other assorted fragmentary remains.	A lycosuchid therocephalian.	Alopecognathus Glanosuchus Lycosuchus
Pardosuchus	P. whaitsi	Prince Albert	Tapinocephalus A-Z.	Holotypes consist of preserved skulls.	A pristerognathinae therocephalian formally named Lycedops scholtzi.	Alopecognathus Glanosuchus Lycosuchus
Pristerognathus	P. minor	Beaufort West and Prince Albert.	Pristerognathus A-Z.	Multiple skull specimens.	A therocephalian.	Alopecognathus Glanosuchus Lycosuchus
Pristerognathus	P. parvus	Beaufort West and Prince Albert.	Pristerognathus A-Z.	Multiple skull specimens.	A therocephalian.	Alopecognathus Glanosuchus Lycosuchus
Pristerognathus	P. vanderbyli	Beaufort West and Prince Albert.	Pristerognathus A-Z.	Multiple skull specimens.	A therocephalian.	Alopecognathus Glanosuchus Lycosuchus
Pristerognathus	P. vanwyki	Beaufort West and Prince Albert.	Pristerognathus A-Z.	Multiple skull specimens.	A therocephalian.	Alopecognathus Glanosuchus Lycosuchus
Scymnosaurus	S. ferox	Prince Albert and Vers Fontein/Jan Willem Fortein	Tapinocephalus A-Z.	Partial skull consists of snout tip, dentition, and palate.	A therocephalian therapsid.	Alopecognathus Glanosuchus Lycosuchus
Simorhinella	S. baini	Prince Albert and Rheboksfontein 74	Tapinocephalus A-Z.		A large lycosuchid therocephalian.	Alopecognathus Glanosuchus Lycosuchus
Tamboeria	T. maraisi	Prince Albert and Tamboers Fontein.	Tapinocephalus A-Z.		A middle-sized carnivorous therocephalian	Alopecognathus Glanosuchus Lycosuchus
Trochosuchus	T. acutus	Rietfontein and Prince Albert.	Tapinocephalus A-Z.	A fossilized skull.	A Lycosuchid therocephalian.	Alopecognathus Glanosuchus Lycosuchus
Trochosuchus	T. intermedius	Rietfontein and Prince Albert.	Tapinocephalus A-Z.	A fossilized skull.	A Lycosuchid therocephalian.	Alopecognathus Glanosuchus Lycosuchus
Trochosuchus	T. major	Rietfontein and Prince Albert.	Tapinocephalus A-Z.	A fossilized skull.	A Lycosuchid therocephalian.	Alopecognathus Glanosuchus Lycosuchus

==== Varanopidae ====
Varanopids of the Abrahamskraal Formation
Taxa	Species	Locality	Assemblage Zone	Material	Notes	Images
Anningia	A. megalops	Prince Albert	The Middle of the Tapinocephalus A-Z.	A partial skull.	A varanopid synapsid.	Elliotsmithia longiceps
Elliotsmithia	E. longiceps	Prince Albert	Tapinocephalus A-Z.	A holotype consists of a skull.	A small varanopid synapsid.	Elliotsmithia longiceps
Heleosaurus	H. scholtzi	Victoria West.	Tapinocephalus A-Z.	A preserved skeleton.	A varanopid synapsid.	Elliotsmithia longiceps
Microvaranops	M. parentis	Beukesplaas farm	Tapinocephalus A-Z.	A skeletal aggregation containing one grown and four immature individuals.	A varanopid synapsid.	Elliotsmithia longiceps

== Paleoflora ==
Plants of the Abrahamskraal Formation
Taxa	Species	Locality	Assemblage Zone	Material	Notes	Images
Dadoxylon	D. sp	Onder Karoo locality				
Dictyopteridium	D. sp	Onder Karoo locality		Cast fossil specimens	A Glossopteridaceae morphotaxon	
Equisetum	E. modderdriftensis	Onder Karoo locality				
Glossopteris	G. sp	Onder Karoo locality		Cast fossil specimens	A Glossopteris morphotaxon	
Lidgettonia	L. sp	Onder Karoo locality		Cast fossil specimens	A Lidgettoniaceae morphotaxon	
Schizoneura	S. africana	Onder Karoo locality				
Ottokaria	O. sp	Onder Karoo locality		Cast fossil specimens	A Glossopteris morphotaxon	

== Correlation ==
The Abrahamskraal Formation corresponds with numerous localities abroad. Currently it is considered to correlate chronostratigraphically with the Rio do Rasto Formation from the Paraná Basin in Brazil, the Madumabisa Mudstone Formation of Zambia, the Ocher and Isheevo faunas of Russia, and to the Dashankou fauna from the Xidagou Formation of China. However, correlative dating between the Xidagou Formation and the Abrahamskraal Formation remains inconsistent and needs further study.
