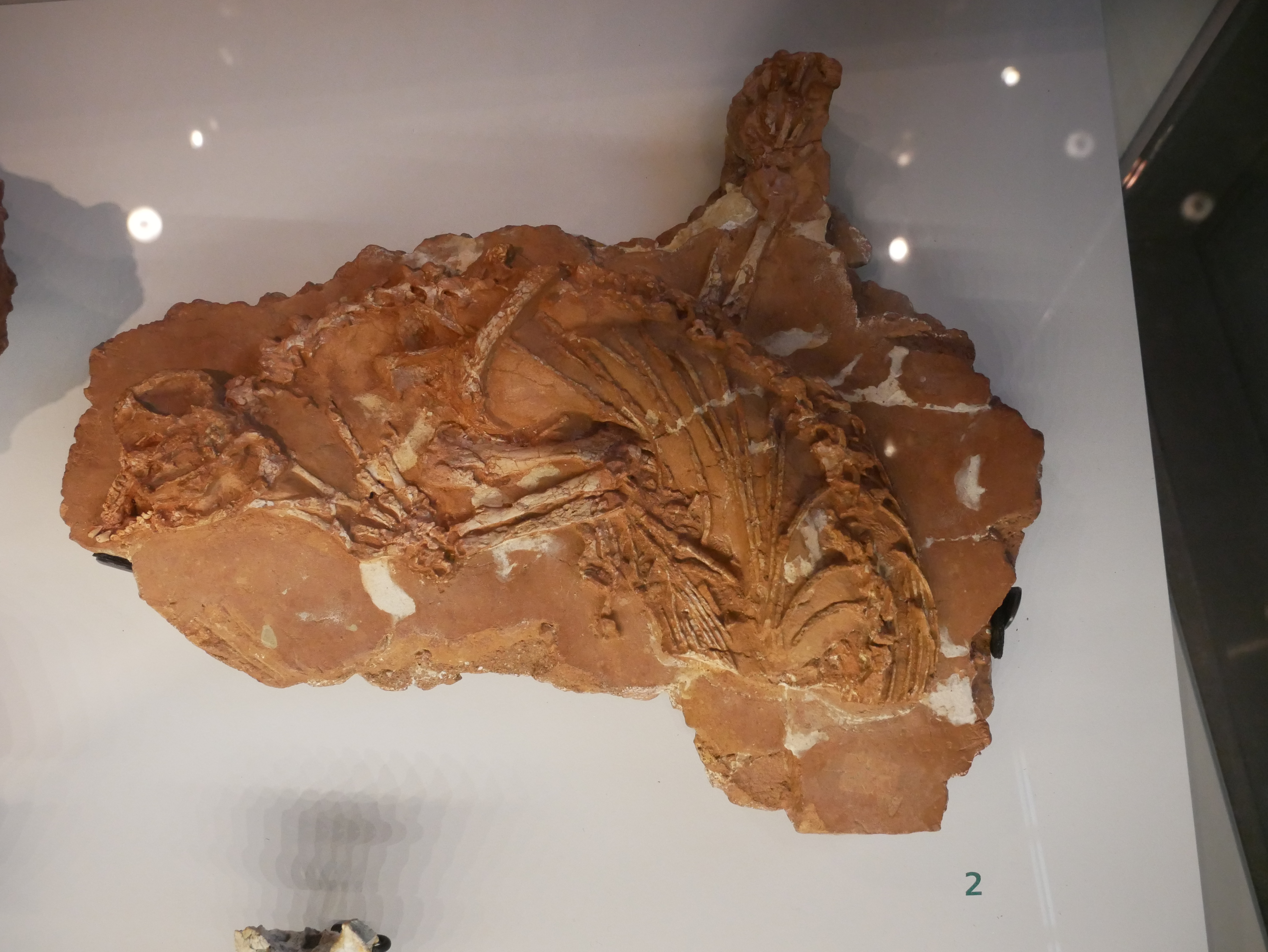
- Skeleton at the Royal Ontario Museum

Scientific classification
- Kingdom: Animalia
- Phylum: Chordata
- Clade: Synapsida
- Clade: Therapsida
- Clade: †Anomodontia
- Genus: †Suminia; Ivachnenko, 1994
- Species: †S. getmanovi

Binomial name
- †Suminia getmanovi Ivachnenko, 1994

= Suminia =

Suminia Temporal range: Late Permian, 268–252 Ma

Extinct genus of therapsids

Suminia is an extinct genus of basal anomodont that lived during the Tatarian age of the late Permian, spanning approximately from 268–252 Ma. Suminia is recognized as the youngest non-dicynodont anomodont and was named in honor of Russian paleontologist D. L. Sumin. Its fossil localities are primarily derived from the Kotel’nich locality of the Kirov Oblast in Russia. However, there have been some isolated specimens found in a few different localities, all from eastern European regions of Russia.

Suminia, along with Otsheria and Ulemica make up the monophyletic group of Russian basal anomodonts named Venyukovioidea.These Venyukovioid anomodonts are understood to have been derived from an ancestor that dispersed from Gondwana into Euramerica. Suminia getmanovi is the only defined species within the genus and it is known for specializations in teeth for effective, functional oral processing of plant material as well as being one of the first species with a proposed arboreal lifestyle.

== Discovery ==
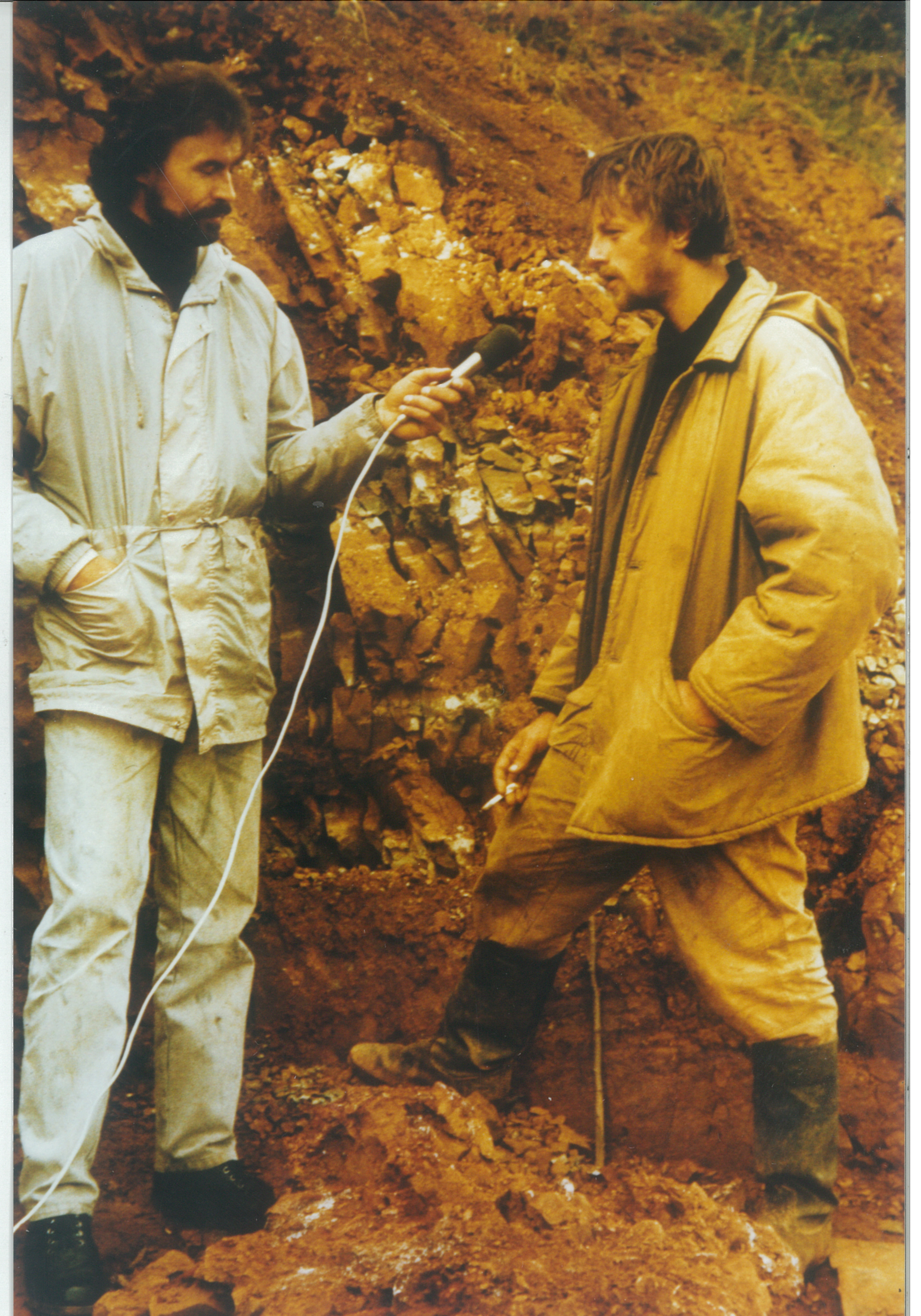
Russian paleontologist D. L. Sumin (right) being interviewed in 1992 during excavations at the Kotel'nich site where Suminia and other Permian tetrapods were found

Suminia was named and described by Russian paleontologist M. F. Ivakhnenko in 1994, based on a nearly complete skeleton (PIN 2212/10) discovered by Russian paleontologist S. N. Getmanov on a dig led by D. L. Sumin in 1990 on the bank of the Vyatka River near the town of Kotel'nich in Kirov Oblast, Russia. Skulls, lower jaws, and isolated teeth found in the same region were also referred to the genus.

New material of Suminia was excavated from the Upper Permian Kotel’nich locality in which a single large block with articulated skeletons of at least 15 specimen of Suminia getmanovi was found. This new material of Suminia getmanovi consisted of mainly subadult to adult specimens that were well preserved (no signs of weathering or predation), suggesting rapid burial perhaps due to a catastrophic event.

== Description ==
Size compared to a human hand

Suminia is diagnosed as a small venyukoviid with various autapomorphies such as large orbit (almost 1/3 of the skull length), large teeth in relation to the skull size, reduced number of 23 presacral vertebrae, a more long than wide cervical vertebrae (suggests elongated neck), elongated limbs, manus and pes equal to ~40% of length of their respective limb, and enlarged distal carpal 1 and tarsal 1.

=== Skull ===
Suminia getmanovi are recognized for their well-preserved skulls and teeth. Suminia skull length is fairly small, measuring in at 58mm long characterized with a short snout with its squamosal regions expanded. While the orbit composes of around 27% of the total skull length, the external naris is also large, measured to compose of about 13% of the total skull length. Cranial features that are only shared with Ulemica that distinguish Suminia and Ulemica from other anomodonts is the preparietal absence, a reduced interparietal suture located anterior to the pineal foramen, and narrow palatine. Suminia cranial anatomy can also be defined by their raised pineal foramen (in comparison with other taxa with the pineal foramen flush with the skull) and premaxilla contact with palatine, which are all features shared by its infraorder, Venyukovioidea. Perhaps one of the most striking cranial anatomy features of Suminia is its similarity in masticatory architecture with dicynodonts, indicating that the sliding jaw articulation may have originated before dicynodonts. Suminia dentition has significant implications on its feeding ecology, which is discussed below.

=== Postcranial skeleton ===
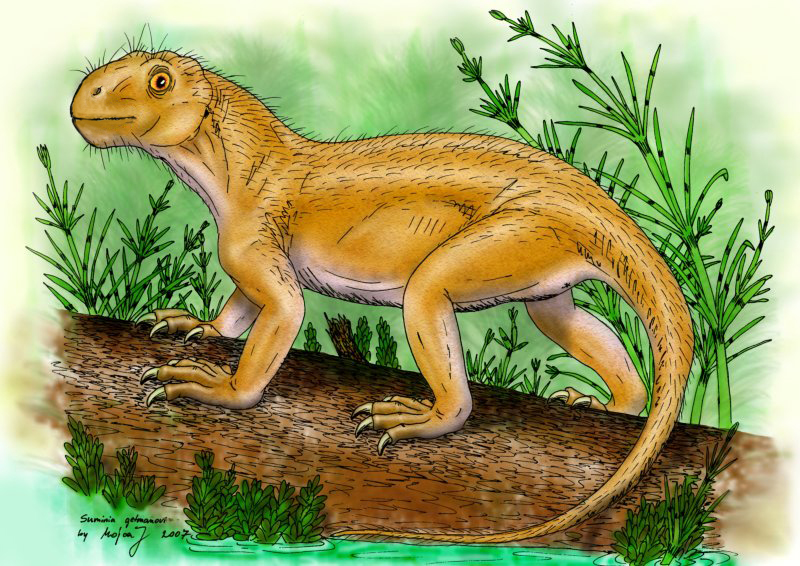
Life restoration

Study of Suminia postcranial anatomy reveals many autapomorphies for the single species. Significant postcranial autapomorphies of Suminia are the reduced number of presacral and dorsal vertebrae (exclusively amphicoelous) with lack of fusion in the sacral region between vertebrae (suggests high flexibility), wide pre- and postzygapophyses, longer proportions of cervical pleurocentra, distinct proportionally longer limbs, a manus that forms ~ 40% of the length of the forelimb with particularly long, curved terminal phalanges, a pes that makes up ~38% of the hindlimb, and enlarged carpal 1 and tarsal 1 (suggests divergent first digit). These different morphological features indicate a significantly deviated postcranial anatomy from other anomodonts, suggesting that Suminia adopted an arboreal lifestyle (see below).

== Classification ==
Suminia belong to the monophyly/infraorder Venyukovioidea, a sub clade of basal anomodonts.

- 1
  - Biseridens
  - - - Anomocephalus
      - Tiarajudens
    - - Patranomodon
      - - 2
          - Suminia
          - - Otsheria
            - Ulemica
        - 3
          - - Galepus
            - Galechirus
          - - Galeops
            - 4
              - "Eodicynodon" oelofseni
              - - - Eodicynodon oosthuizeni
                  - Colobodectes
                - - Lanthanostegus
                  - - Chelydontops
                    - - Endothiodon
                      - - Pristerodon
                        - 5
                          - 6
                            - 7
                              - Diictodon
                              - - Eosimops
                                - - Prosictodon
                                  - Robertia
                            - 8
                              - Emydops
                              - 9
                                - 10
                                  - Dicynodontoides
                                  - Kombuisia
                                - - Myosaurus
                                  - 11
                                    - Cistecephalus
                                    - - Cistecephaloides
                                      - Kawingasaurus
                          - 12
  1 Anomodontia, 2 Venyukovioidea, 3 Chainosauria, 4 Dicynodontia, 5 Therochelonia, 6 Diictodontia, 7 Pylaecephalidae, 8 Emydopoidea, 9 Kistecephalia, 10 Kingoriidae, 11 Cistecephalidae, 12 Bidentalia

== Paleobiology ==
=== Arboreal lifestyle ===
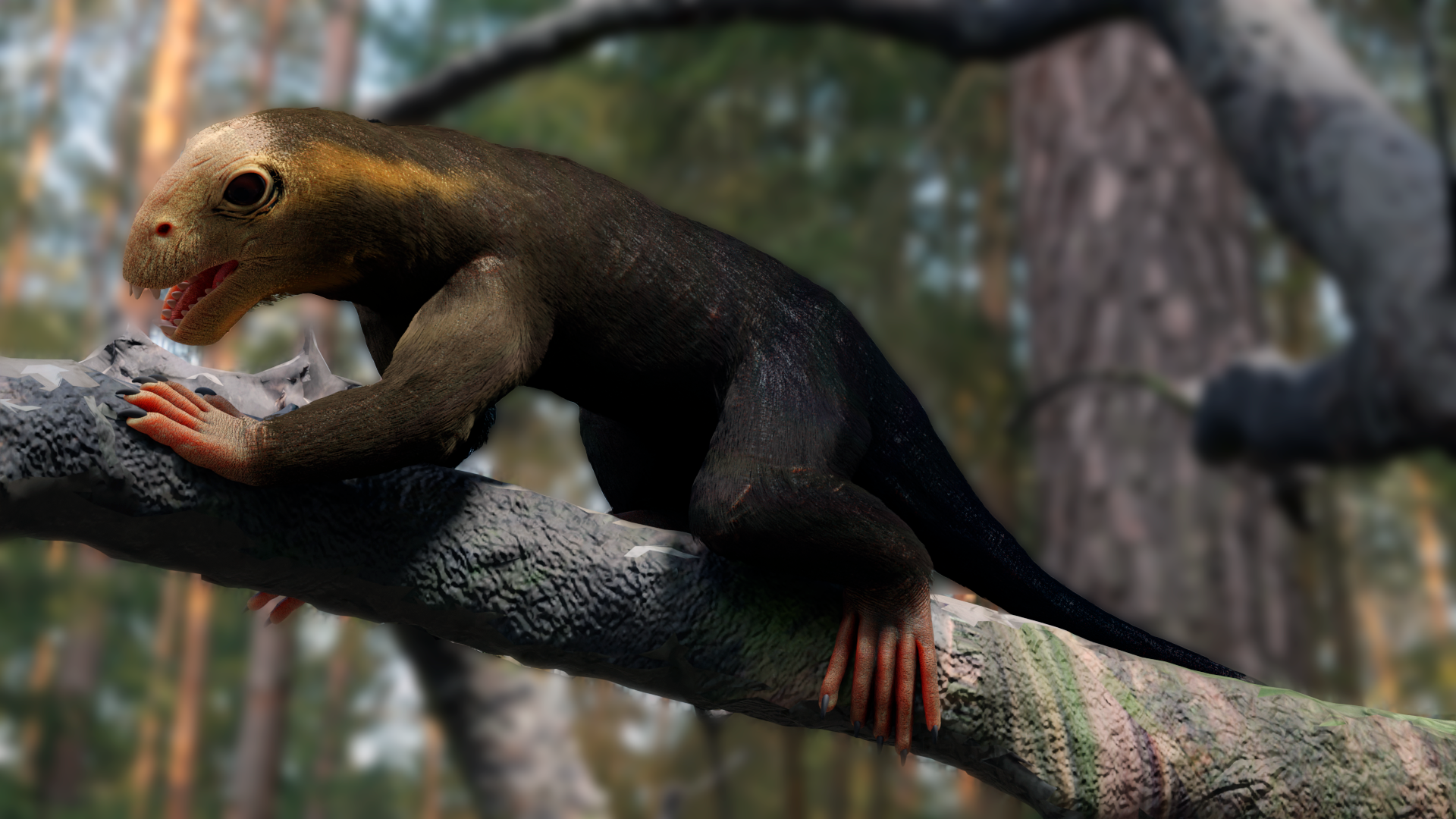
Life restoration in a tree

Adaptations to arboreal lifestyle are understood to evolve through convergent evolution. However, many arboreal vertebrates share similar physical mechanisms (grasping, clinging, hooking). Other features common to climbing and tree-living animals include lighter bones, longer limbs, small size, and a longer tail. The varanopids Eoscansor from the Pennsylvanian subperiod of the Carboniferous of North America and Ascendonanus from the Lower Permian of Germany show earlier anatomical specializations for climbing and life in trees among synapsids.

Suminia shares many features with other arboreal tetrapods. While its forelimbs retain the sprawling posture found in other anomodonts, the digits of both front and back paws were enlarged and modified for climbing. Evidence for grasping abilities include a first digit that could spread away from the others. The first digit is measured to have an angle of ~30-40 degrees to the remaining digits of the manus and pes, which grants ability of the first digit to flex ventrally, independent of the rest of the digits. This is further supported by the elongated limbs and claw shaped, laterally compressed terminal phalanges which would aid in clinging ability. In addition, the tail anatomy with expansion of the anterior region and suggests ability of balance as well as prehensile, grasping abilities, providing more evidence for arboreal lifestyle.

A study of the microanatomy of Suminia′s limb bones published in 2025 added more support for a tree-living lifestyle. Research revealed relatively thin bone walls and a lack of internal support structures called trabeculae, in strong contrast to the very thick bone walls and dense trabeculae typically found in other anomodonts. Along with its small size, Suminia′s lighter limb bones would be an adaptation for climbing in trees.

Via a morphometric analysis as well as comparison to other arboreal vertebrates, Suminia getmanovi provides anatomical evidence that it lived among the trees, stamping a significant mark in evolutionary history for arboreal lifestyle.

=== Diet and feeding ===
In combination with a masticatory architecture similar to dicynodonts (defined by sliding jaw articulation), Suminia’s canineless, large leaf-shaped teeth follow occluding dentition that is completely marginal, which differs from other species with leaf-shaped teeth present. This provides indications not only for herbivory, but into the mechanisms of oral processing. One interesting feature of the occlusal pattern in Suminia dentition is the angle of the occluding surfaces. With an angle of 75 degrees from jaw plane, it is suggested that Suminia’s more posterior teeth shred food material rather than crush it. The anterior teeth are observed to be significantly larger and devoid of this occlusal pattern. Therefore, the more anterior teeth are suggested to be responsible for cutting off pieces of plant for the posterior teeth to shred. Suminia are therefore understood to have been obligatory herbivores as the dentition and mandibular function permits shredding of plant material via posterior translation.

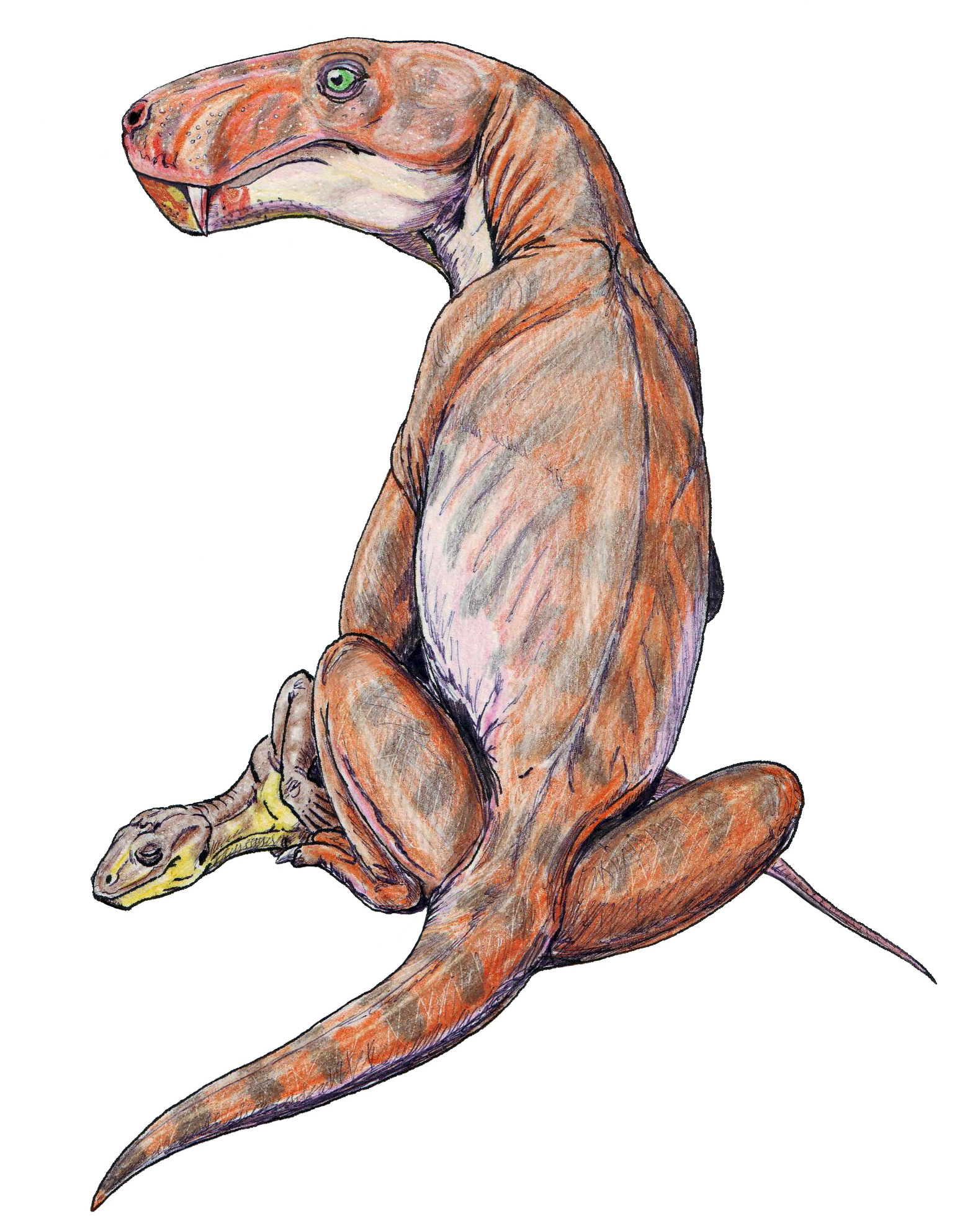
Life restoration of Viatkogorgon preying on Suminia

Teeth replacement was discovered to be infrequent, which was shown in certain specimens of Suminia getmanovi that were seen to have teeth worn down almost to the neck. However, these wear facets on the upper and lower posterior teeth are in themselves, consistent with herbivory in that the locations of the wear (labial and lingual aspects of upper and lower posterior teeth respectively), are distinct evidence that the wear isn't a consequence of tooth-to-food but rather tooth-to-tooth occlusion. The evidence for Suminia’s extensive oral processing suggest that Suminia dentition is highly specialized for high fiber herbivory. This provides an alternative explanation that the ability to process tough, high fiber plant material may have been a more basal feature of anomodonts than previously thought.

== See also ==
- List of therapsids
