= Eodicynodon Assemblage Zone =

Permian biozone in South Africa

- Stratigraphic range: Middle Permian
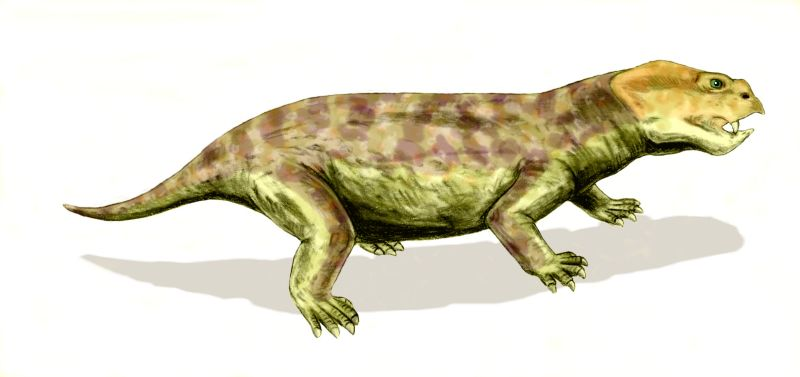
- Eodicynodon oosthuizeni
- Type: Biozone
- Unit of: Abrahamskraal Formation of the Beaufort Group
- Underlies: Tapinocephalus Assemblage Zone
- Overlies: Ecca Group
- Thickness: up to 2,034.12 feet (620 m)

Location
- Region: Northern & Western Cape
- Country: South Africa
- Extent: Karoo Basin

Type section
- Named for: Eodicynodon
- Named by: Harry Govier Seeley (1892); Robert Broom (1906, 1909)

The Eodicynodon Assemblage Zone is a tetrapod assemblage zone or biozone which correlates to the Abrahamskraal Formation, Adelaide Subgroup of the Beaufort Group, a fossiliferous and geologically important geological Group of the Karoo Supergroup in South Africa. The thickest outcrops, reaching approximately 620 metres (2,030 ft), occur south-east of Sutherland, north of Prince Albert, and south-east of Beaufort West. The Eodicynodon Assemblage Zone is the lowermost biozone of the Beaufort Group.

The name of the biozone refers to Eodicynodon oosthuizeni, a small to medium-sized herbivorous dicynodont therapsid. It is characterized by the presence of this dicynodont genus along with the Nyaphulia, and the dinocephalian Tapinocaninus pamelae.

== History ==
The first fossils to be found in the Beaufort Group rocks that encompass the current eight biozones were discovered by Andrew Geddes Bain in 1856. However, it was not until 1892 that it was observed that the geological strata of the Beaufort Group could be differentiated based on their fossil taxa. The initial undertaking was done by Harry Govier Seeley who subdivided the Beaufort Group into three biozones, which he named (from oldest to youngest):

- Zone of "Pareiasaurians"
- Zone of "Dicynodonts"
- Zone of "highly specialized group of theriodonts"

These proposed biozones Seeley named were subdivided further by Robert Broom between 1906 and 1909. Broom proposed the following biozones (from oldest to youngest):

- Pareiasaurus beds
- Endothiodon beds
- Kistecephalus beds
- Lystrosaurus beds
- Procolophon beds
- Cynognathus beds

These biozone divisions were approved by paleontologists of the time and were left largely unchanged for several decades. The rocks composing the current Eodicynodon Assemblage Zone were previously included in the upper Waterford Formation of the underlying Ecca Group. This was due to prior observations of the biozone rock colours not being consistent with the known reddish to purple colours that are diagnostic of the Beaufort Group. After further stratigraphic reorganization of the Beaufort Group was conducted from the 1970s, it was discovered that the Eodicynodon Assemblage Zone correlated with the lower Abrahamskraal Formation, the lowermost geological formation of the Beaufort Group, and that the fossils of Eodicynodon sp. were only known from these specific rocks. The Eodicynodon Assemblage Zone is currently accepted as the oldest biozone of the Beaufort Group.

== Lithology ==
The Eodicynodon Assemblage Zone correlates with the lower Abrahamskraal Formation, Adelaide Subgroup of the Beaufort Group.Outcrops of this biozone are only known from the south-western margins of the Abrahamskraal Formation and is considered to be Middle Permian (Guadalupian) in age.

The rocks of the Eodicynodon Assemblage Zone comprise mudstones, siltstones, and fine-grained, siliceous sandstone. The mudstones are olive green to moderate yellowish brown in colour and contain thinner light reddish-brown layers. The reddish-brown layers frequently contain calcareous nodules. Desiccation cracks - indicative of seasonal dry periods - and raindrop impressions are sometimes found in the mudstone layers. Argillaceous layers are also common. The siltstones are extremely fine-grained, often containing ripple marks from being deposited in low energy streams, and vary from being dark grey, greenish-grey, and blueish-grey in colour. Thin sheets of chert occur in the mudstone and less commonly in the siltstone layers. The sandstones are fine-grained and vary from being greyish olive green to dark yellowish brown. Some sandstone layers either contain or are capped by pebble-sized mudstone-clast conglomerates. These conglomerates also contain isolated fossils in some localities. The sandstones are more common and at their thickest towards the upper sections of the biozone. The rocks of this biozone were likely deposited in a subaerial deltaic environment which included floodplains. The presence of calcareous nodules also indicates that the environment was warm with seasonal dry periods.

The depositional environment of the Eodicynodon Assemblage Zone was formed by sedimentary material being deposited in the Karoo Basin - a retro-arc foreland basin - by vast, low-energy alluvial plains flowing northwards from a southerly source area in the rising the Gondwanide mountains. The Gondwanides were the result of crustal uplift that had previously begun to take course due to subduction of the Palaeo-pacific plate beneath the Gondwanan Plate. Orogenic pulses from the growing Gondwanides mountain chain and associated subduction created accommodation space for sedimentation in the Karoo Basin where the deposits of the Eodicynodon Assemblage zone, and all other succeeding assemblage zones, were deposited over millions of years.

== Paleontology ==
The Eodicynodon Assemblage Zone is characterized by the presence of the dicynodont species Eodicynodon and the dinocephalian Tapinocaninus pamelae. The biozone is not especially fossiliferous with the fossils of dicynodonts Eodicynodon sp. and the dinocephalians Tapinocaninus and Australosyodon nyaphuli being most commonly found. The preservation of these fossil taxa are good with the majority of fossils being found in the mudstone layers. This is especially true of the reddish-brown mudstones containing calcareous nodules. Interestingly, dinocephalian fossils have been more commonly found in the sandstones, and fossil fragments have been found in the mudstone-clast conglomerates. However, tantalizing remains of more numerous fossil species have been found to date, hinting at the true level of fossil diversity that could be discovered in the future. The fragmented material includes the scales of the fish Namaichthys digitata, species of temnospondyl amphibians, and skull material of gorgonopsids. Rarer fossils encountered in this biozone include skull material of therocephalians, various anomodonts such as Patranomodon nyaphulii, trace fossils of planolites and arthropod trackways, molluscs, and the plant remains of Glossopteris symmetrifolia, Equisetum modderdriftensis, and Schizoneura africana.

The following faunal list follows Rubidge and Day 2020 unless noted otherwise.

=== Synapsids ===
- Australosyodon nyaphuli
- Eodicynodon oosthuizeni
- Eutheriodon vandenheeveri (includes Glanosuchus macrops and Ictidosuchus angusticeps of Rubidge & Day, 2020)
- Nyaphulia oelofseni (formerly "Eodicynodon" oosthuizeni)
- Patranomodon nyaphuli
- Tapinocaninus pamelae
- Gorgonopsia indet.

=== Temnospondyls ===
- Temnospondyl indet.

=== Fish ===
- Namaichthys digitata

=== Mollusks ===
- cf. Palaeanodonta

=== Plants ===
- Glossopteris sp.
- Schizoneura sp.

=== Ichnofossils ===
- Planolites
- Umfolozia

== See also ==
- List of synapsids
