= John Nyaphuli =

South African fossil hunter and preparator (1933–2020)

John Nyaphuli and a near-complete Tapinocaninus fossil that he discovered

Mosiuoa John Nyaphuli (March 12, 1933 in Wepener, Free State – July 24, 2020 in Bloemfontein) was a South African fossil hunter and preparator who worked at the National Museum, Bloemfontein. He discovered the holotypes for several new fossil species, and was responsible for the majority of the early fossil finds in the Ecca Group; as well, he was responsible for several technical advances in fossil preparation.

The Sunday Times called him "one of the greatest fossil collectors in South Africa".

== Early life ==
Nyaphuli left school after Grade 7, and moved to Bloemfontein in pursuit of employment. From 1962 to 1967, he worked in food preparation for the South African Defence Force, after which he served as a messenger at the University of the Orange Free State until 1973, when he joined the National Museum as a fossil preparator.

== Recognition ==
In 1992, he was unanimously made an honorary life member of the Palaeontological Society of South Africa, and in 2011, he won the Society of Vertebrate Paleontology's Morris F. Skinner Award.

Two species — Australosyodon nyaphuli and Patranomodon nyaphulii — are named for him, as is the genus Nyaphulia.
