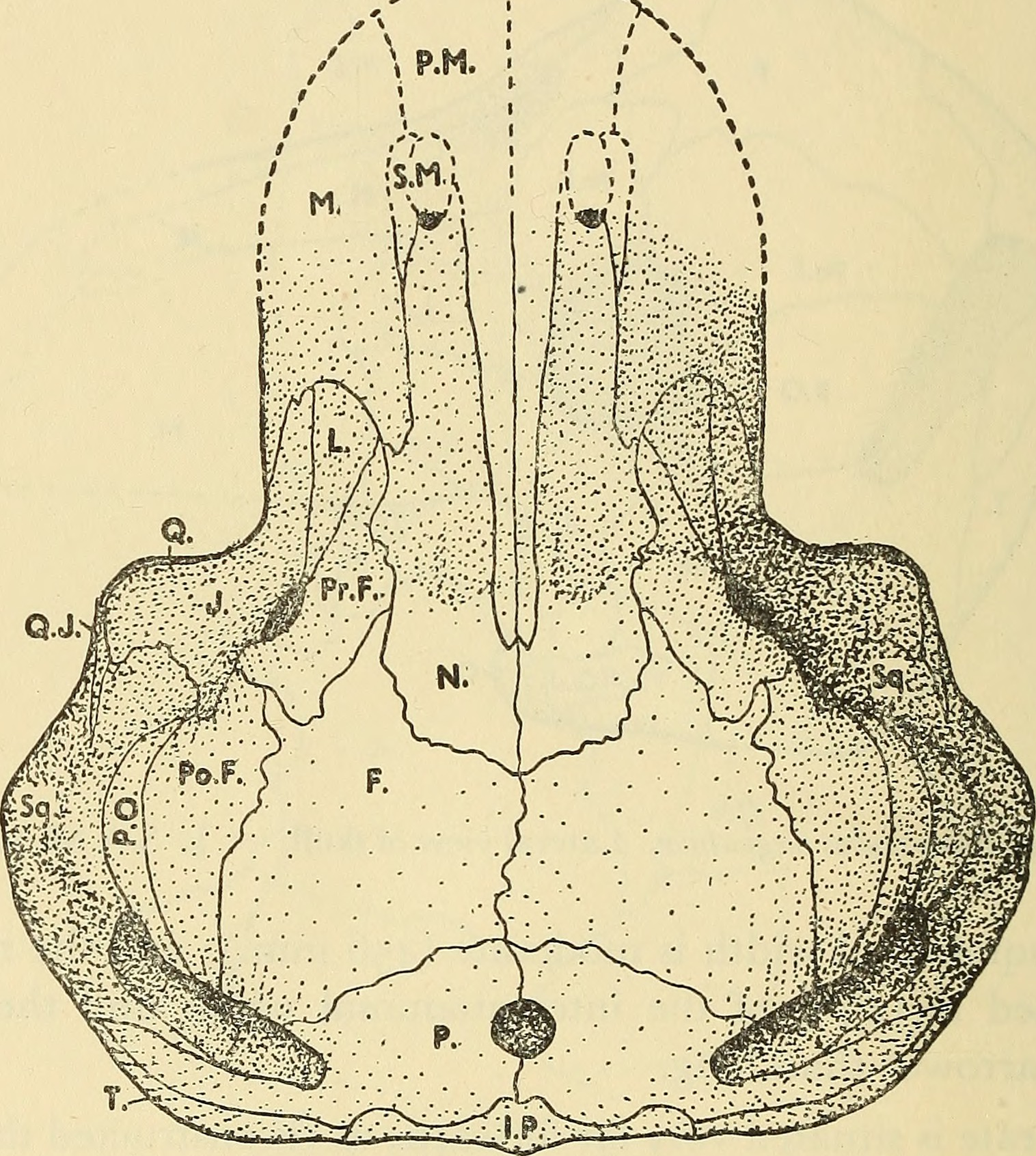
- A partial skull of Phocosaurus

Scientific classification
- Domain: Eukaryota
- Kingdom: Animalia
- Phylum: Chordata
- Clade: Synapsida
- Clade: Therapsida
- Suborder: †Dinocephalia
- Family: †Tapinocephalidae
- Genus: †Phocosaurus; Seeley, 1888

= Phocosaurus =

Phocosaurus Temporal range: 264.28–259.51 Ma Capitanian (Permian)

Extinct genus

Phocosaurus is an extinct genus of tapinocephalian therapsid. It was found in the Capitanian sediments in the Abrahamskraal Formation of South Africa.

== See also ==
- List of synapsids
