= Tamboeria =

Tamboeria Temporal range: Middle Permian

Scientific classification
- Domain: Eukaryota
- Kingdom: Animalia
- Phylum: Chordata
- Clade: Synapsida
- Clade: Therapsida
- Clade: †Therocephalia
- Family: †Scylacosauridae
- Genus: †Tamboeria; Seeley, 1904

Type species
- †T. maraisi Seeley, 1904

Extinct genus of therapsids from the middle Permian of South Africa

Tamboeria is an extinct genus of middle sized carnivorous therocephalians from the Tapinocephalus Assemblage Zone of South Africa.

== See also ==
- List of therapsids
