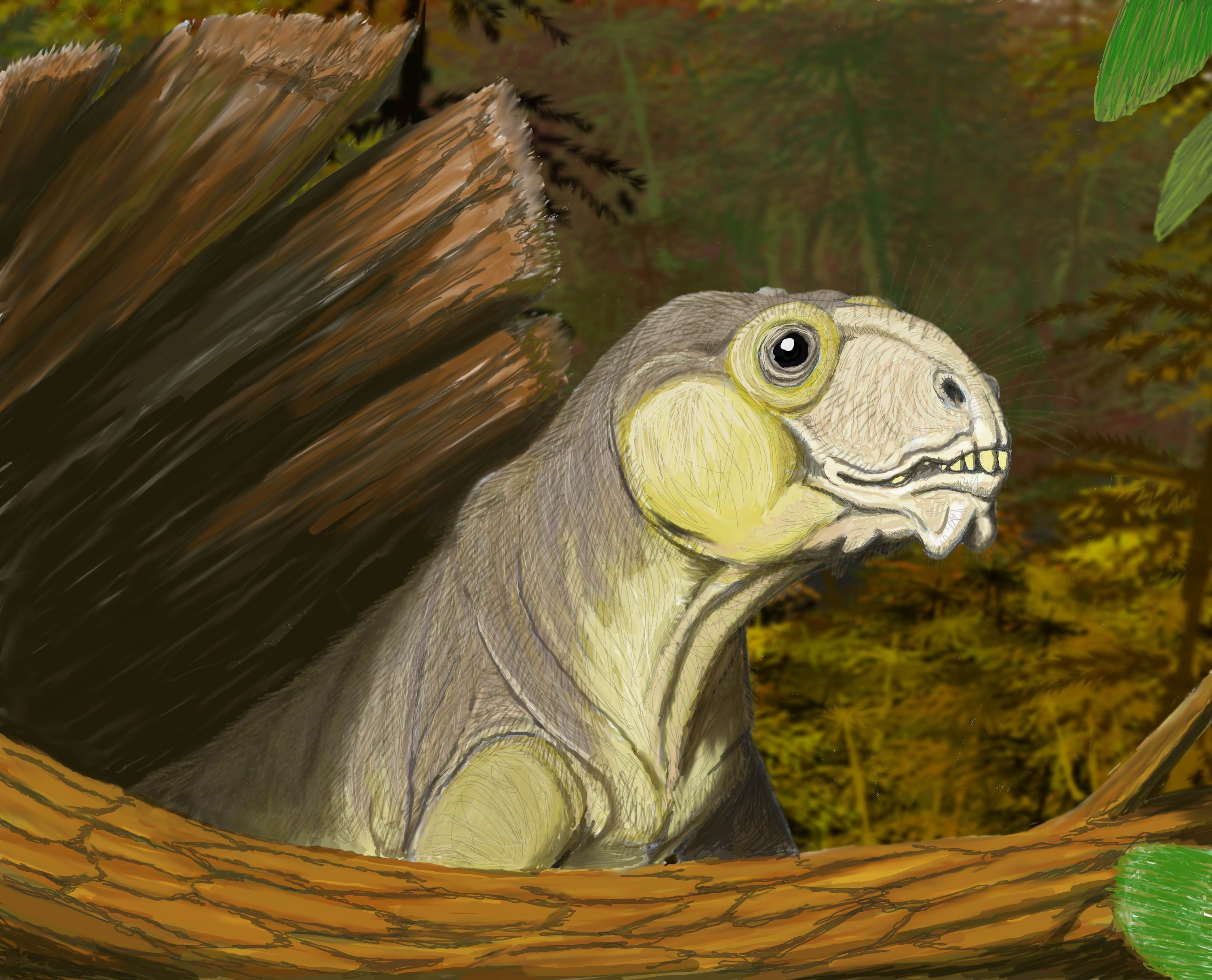
- Restoration of Ulemica sp.

Scientific classification
- Kingdom: Animalia
- Phylum: Chordata
- Clade: Synapsida
- Clade: Therapsida
- Clade: †Anomodontia
- Infraorder: †Venyukovioidea
- Genus: †Ulemica; Ivakhnenko, 1996

Type species
- †Venyukovia invisa Efremov, 1940

Species
- †U. invisa (Efremov, 1940); †U. efremovi Ivakhnenko, 1996

= Ulemica =

Ulemica Temporal range: Middle Permian, 265 Ma

Extinct genus of therapsids

Ulemica is an extinct genus of venyukovioid therapsids, a type of anomodont related to dicynodonts. It lived during the Middle Permian period in what is now Russia, and is known from the Isheevo assemblage of the Amanakskaya Formation. The type species, U. invisa, was originally placed in the genus Venyukovia by Russian palaeontologist Ivan Efremov in 1940. It was later given its own genus Ulemica in 1996 by Mikhaïl Ivakhnenko, who also named a second species U. efremovi. Efremov had originally intended to name the fossils of U. invisa as 'Myctosuchus invisus', however, he later recognised their similarity to Venyukovia and chose to assign the Isheevo material to this genus and leaving 'Myctosuchus' a nomen nudum.

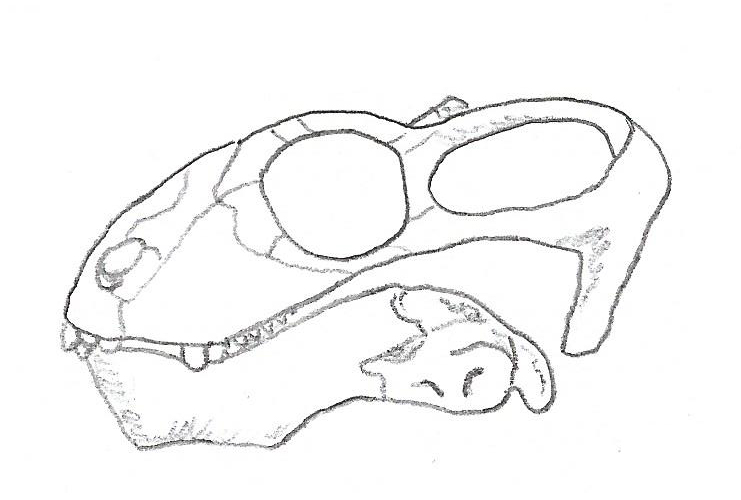
Illustration of a composite Ulemica skull, combining the cranium of U. efremovi with mandibles of U. invisa.

Ulemica is known from multiple skulls and jaws from individuals of various ages, mostly of U. invisa, while U. efremovi is known only by a single skull. An unusual feature of Ulemica is a pair of prominent bony bosses on each mandible, one at the bottom corner of the chin and another along the bottom edge of the jaw. These bosses are only seen in the largest and presumably oldest individuals.

== See also ==
- List of therapsids
