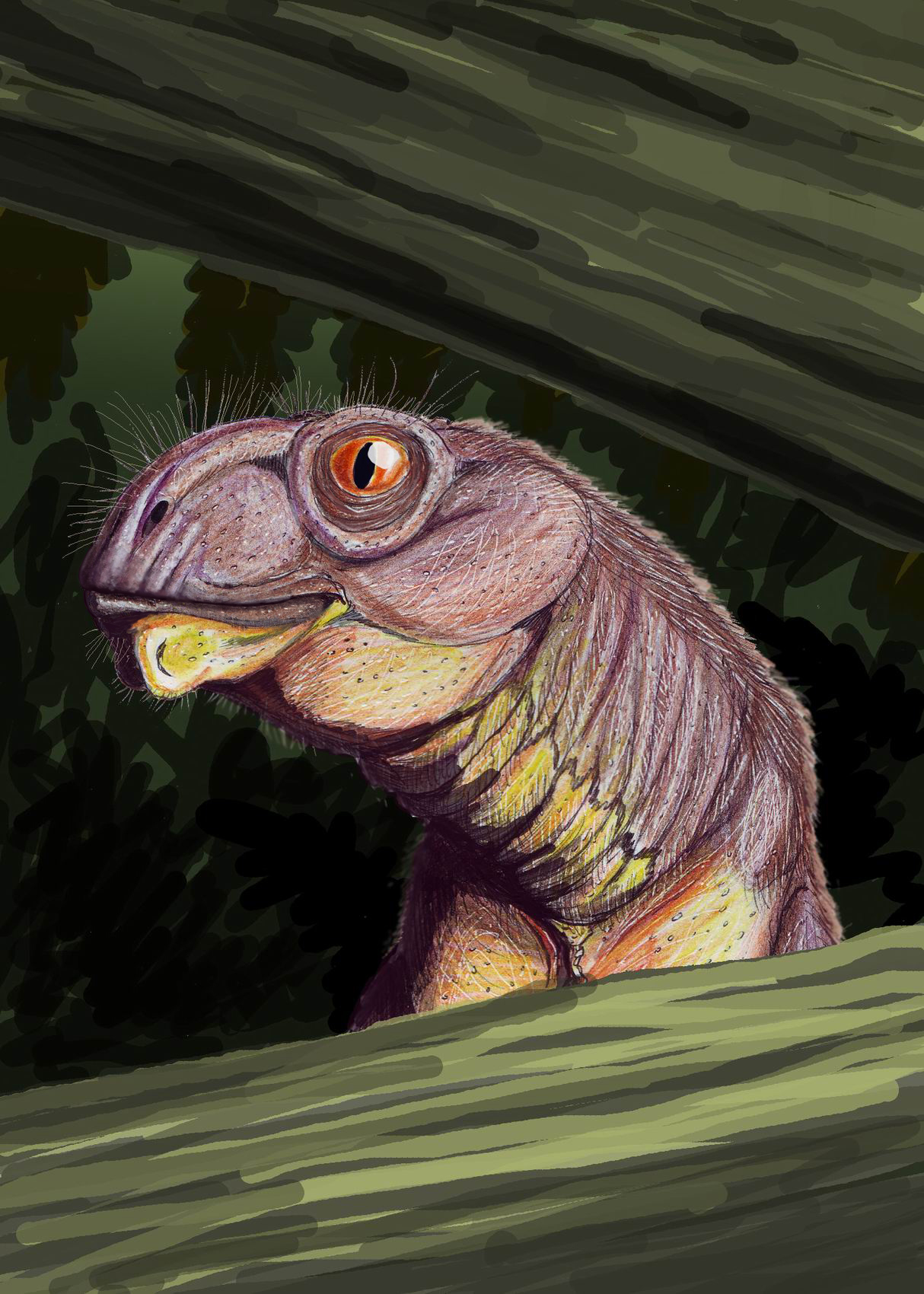
- Life restoration of Otsheria

Scientific classification
- Kingdom: Animalia
- Phylum: Chordata
- Clade: Synapsida
- Clade: Therapsida
- Clade: †Anomodontia
- Genus: †Otsheria; Tchudinov, 1960
- Species: †O. netzvetajevi

Binomial name
- †Otsheria netzvetajevi Tchudinov, 1960

= Otsheria =

Otsheria Temporal range: Middle Permian, 267 Ma

Extinct genus of therapsids

Otsheria is an extinct genus of anomodont, in the infraorder Venyukovioidea. It lived in modern-day Russia during the Permian.

The genus is named for the Ochyor region where it was discovered in 1960, and the type species is Otsheria netzvetajevi.

The holotype, a skull lacking a mandible (PIN 1758/5), is the only Otsheria fossil extant. The skull is 10.5 centimetres (4.1 in) in length, with large eye sockets and a short, broad snout. The skull suggests four incisors and nine short, flattened maxillary teeth. The canines are undifferentiated. The shape of the teeth and skull both suggest a mouth adapted for cutting plant parts, which in turn suggests a herbivorous or omnivorous diet.

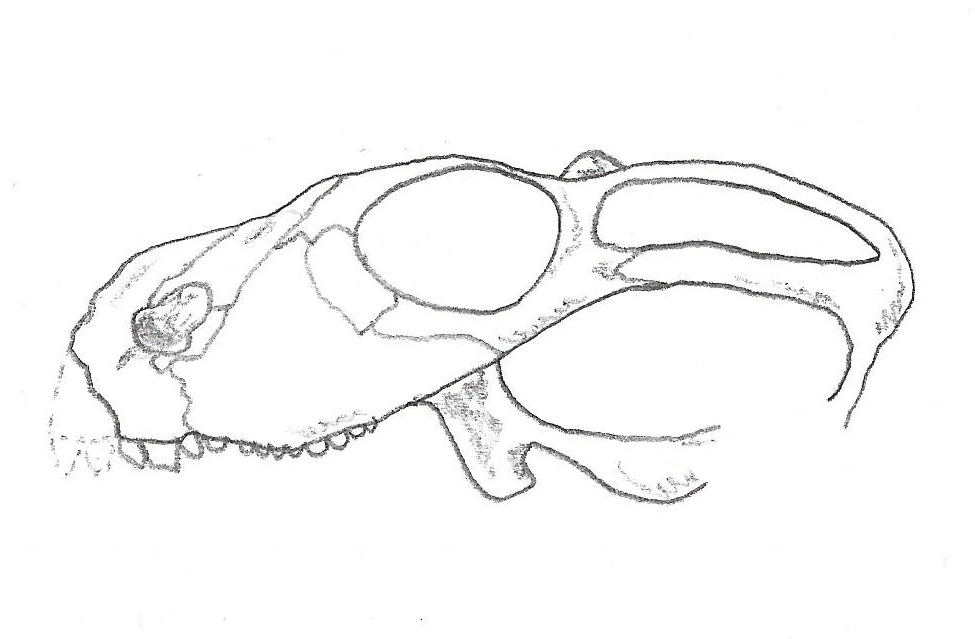
O. netzvetajevi skull.

== See also ==
- List of therapsids
