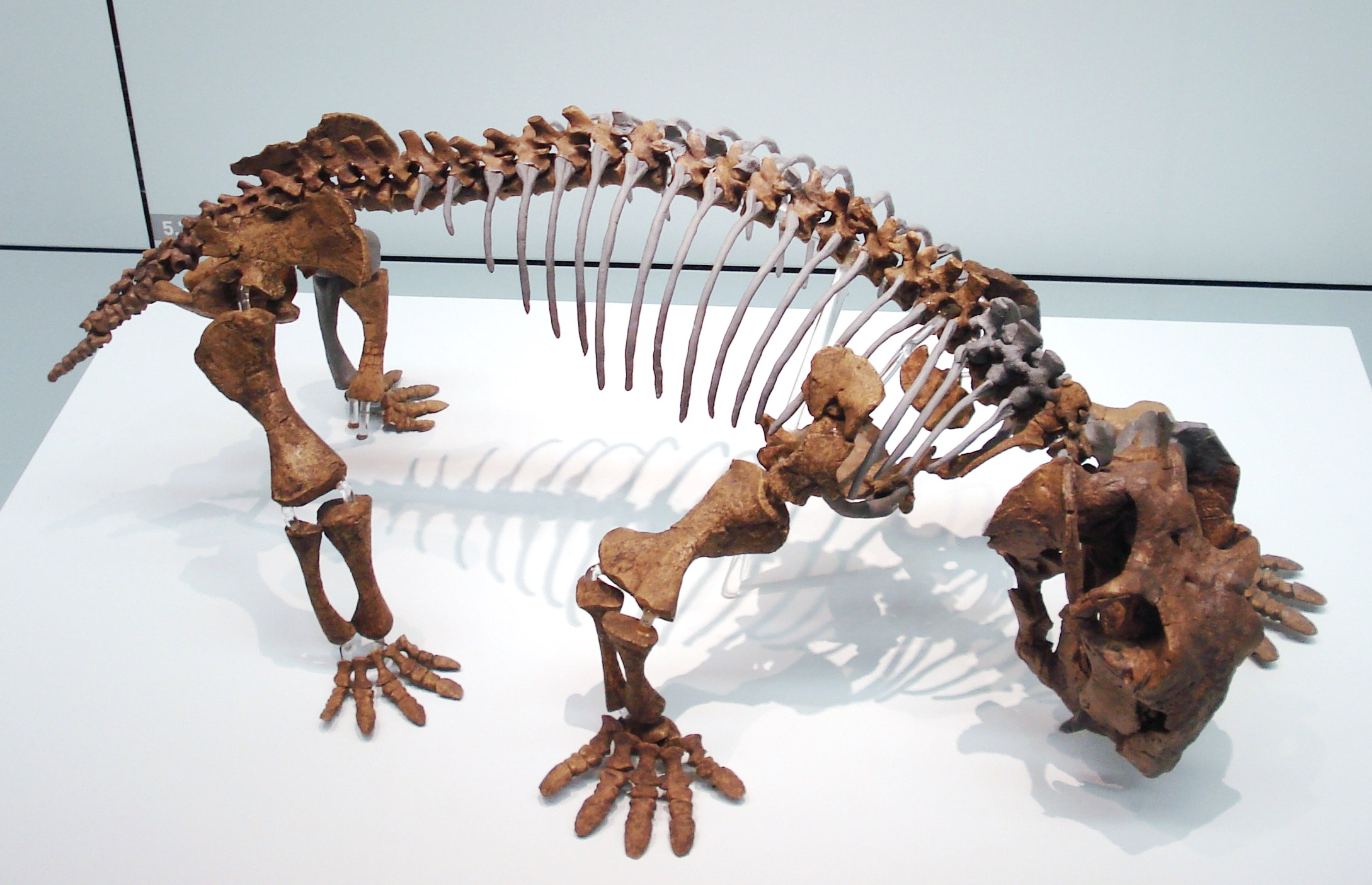
- Mounted skeleton of Lystrosaurus

Scientific classification
- Kingdom: Animalia
- Phylum: Chordata
- Clade: Synapsida
- Clade: Therapsida
- Clade: †Anomodontia; Owen, 1859

Subgroups
- †Biseridens; †Anomocephaloidea; †Chainosauria; †Venyukovioidea

= Anomodontia =

Anomodontia Temporal range: Middle Permian-Late Triassic, 270–205 Ma

Suborder of stem-mammals

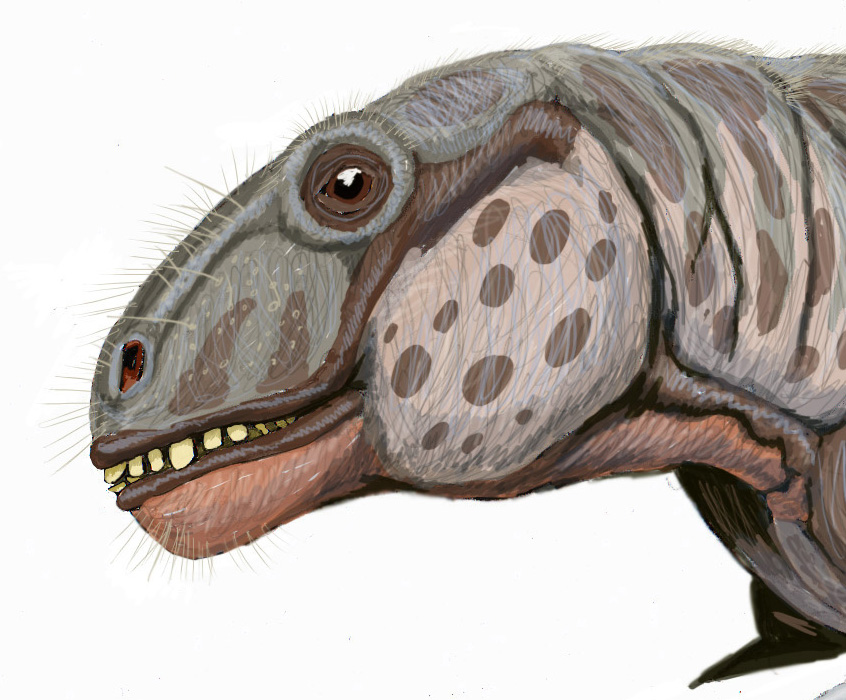
Anomocephalus

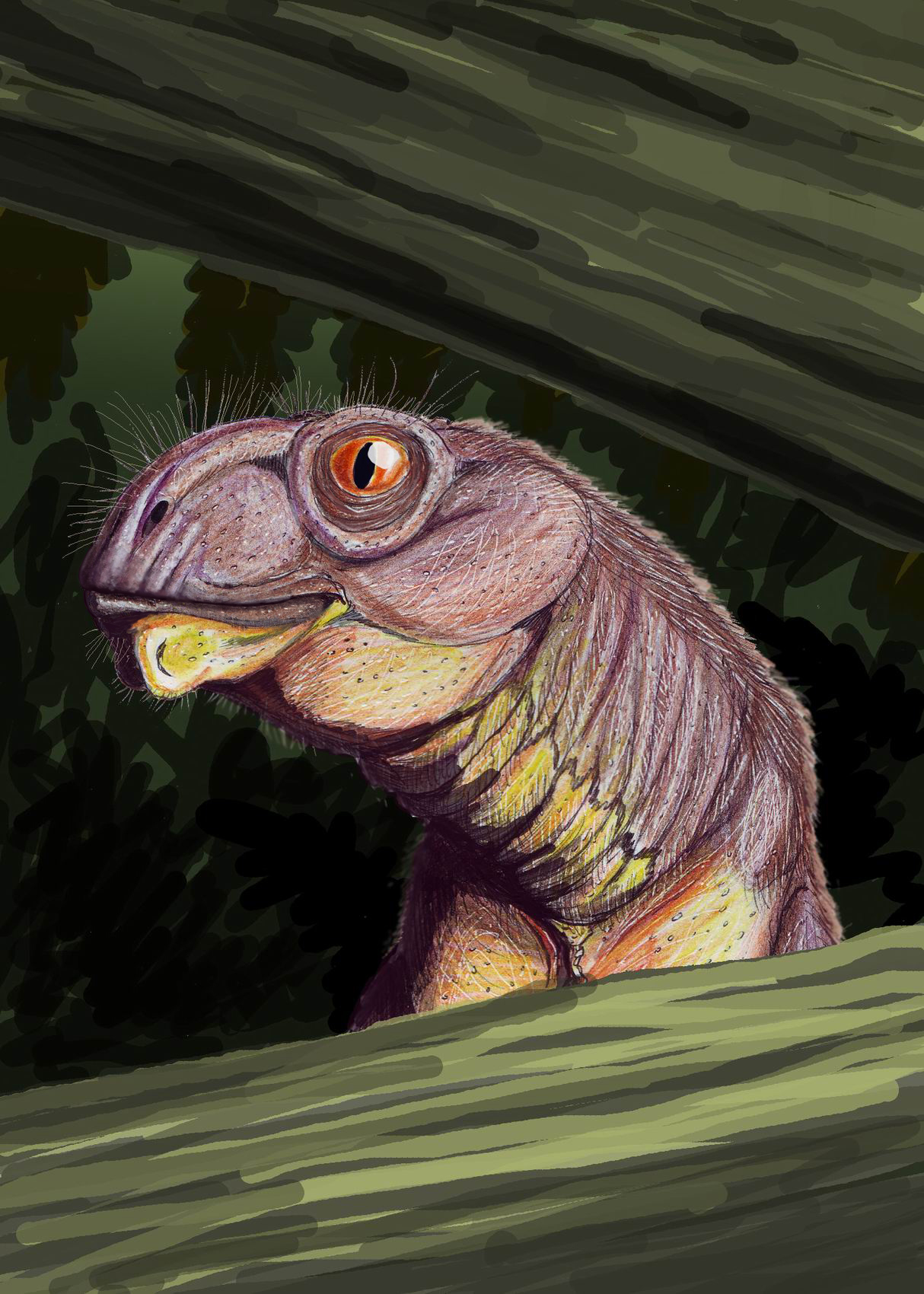
Otsheria

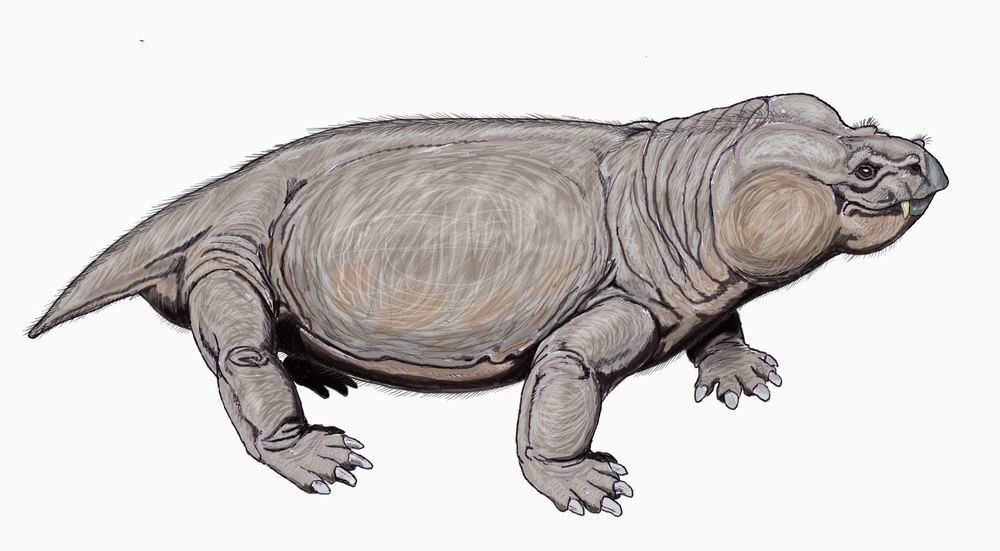
Aulacocephalodon

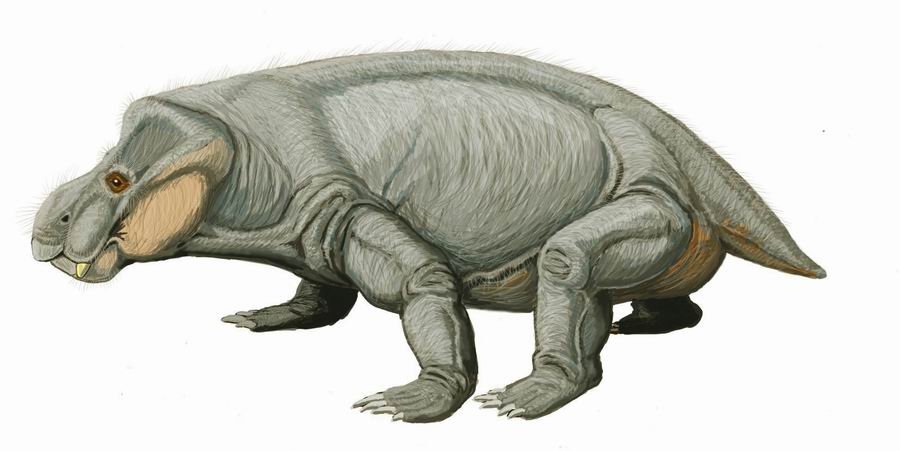
Kannemeyeria

Anomodontia is an extinct group of non-mammalian therapsids from the Permian and Triassic periods. By far the most speciose group are the dicynodonts, a clade of beaked, tusked herbivores. Anomodonts were very diverse during the Middle Permian, including primitive forms like Anomocephalus and Patranomodon and groups like Venyukovioidea and Dromasauria, with the tree-climbing (arboreal) Suminia being known from the Late Permian. Dicynodonts became the most successful and abundant of all herbivores in the Late Permian, filling ecological niches ranging from large browsers down to small burrowers. Few dicynodont families survived the Permian–Triassic extinction event, but one lineage (Kannemeyeriiformes) evolved into large, stocky forms that became dominant terrestrial herbivores right until the Late Triassic, when changing conditions caused them to decline, finally going extinct during the Triassic–Jurassic extinction event.

== Classification ==
=== Taxonomy ===
- Genus †Biseridens
- Clade †Anomocephaloidea
  - Genus †Anomocephalus
  - Genus †Tiarajudens
- Clade †Chainosauria
  - Genus †Galechirus?
  - Genus †Galeops
  - Genus †Galepus
  - Genus †Patranomodon
  - Clade †Dicynodontia
- Clade †Venyukovioidea
  - Genus †Otsheria
  - Genus †Parasuminia
  - Genus †Suminia
  - Genus †Ulemica
  - Genus †Venyukovia

=== Phylogeny ===
Cladogram modified from Cisneros et al., 2015.

- Anomodontia
  - Biseridens
  - - Anomocephaloidea
      - Anomocephalus
      - Tiarajudens
    - - Galechirus
      - Venyukovioidea
        - Otsheria
        - - Suminia
          - Ulemica
      - Chainosauria
        - Patranomodon
        - - Galeops
          - Dicynodontia

Cladogram modified from Angielczyk and Kammerer (2017):

- Anomodontia
  - Biseridens
  - - Venyukovioidea
      - Otsheria
      - - Suminia
        - Ulemica
    - Chainosauria
      - Galepus
      - - Anomocephaloidea
          - Anomocephalus
          - Tiarajudens
        - - Patranomodon
          - - Galechirus
            - - Galeops
              - Dicynodontia

== See also ==
- Theriodont
- Dinocephalia
- Biarmosuchians
- Evolution of mammals
