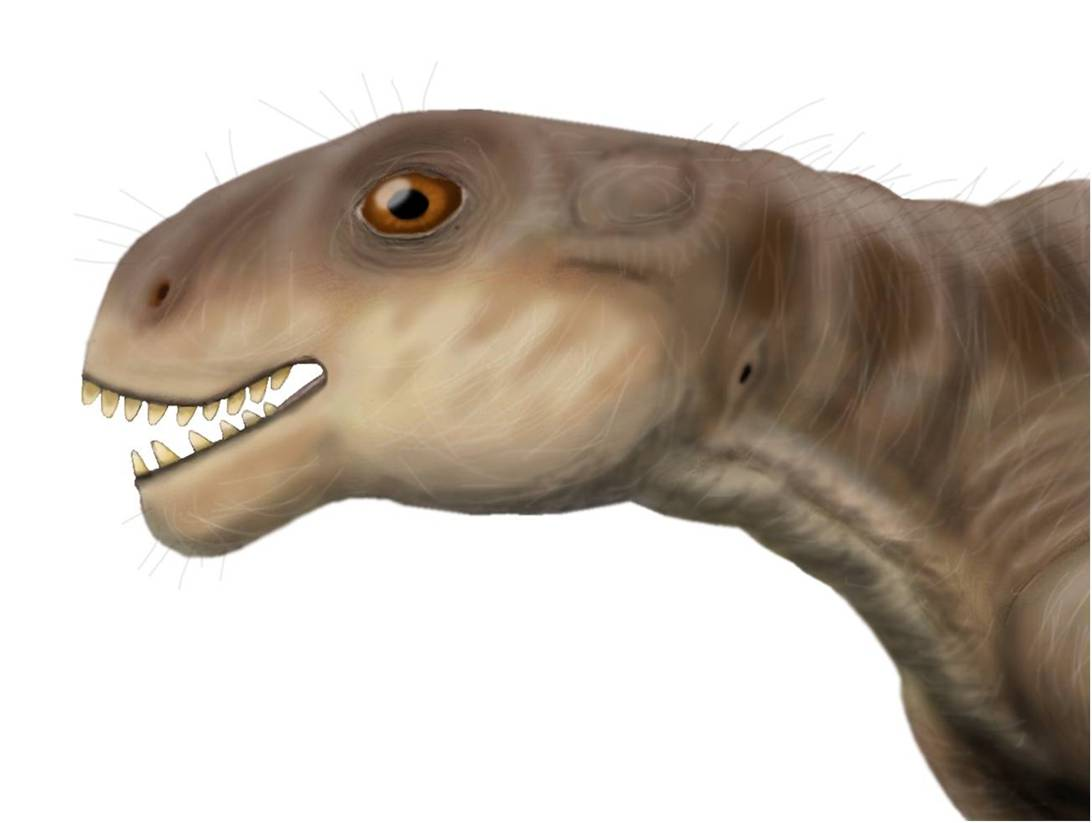

Scientific classification
- Domain: Eukaryota
- Kingdom: Animalia
- Phylum: Chordata
- Clade: Synapsida
- Clade: Therapsida
- Suborder: †Anomodontia
- Clade: †Chainosauria
- Genus: †Patranomodon; Rubidge and Hopson, 1990
- Species: †P. nyaphulii

Binomial name
- †Patranomodon nyaphulii Rubidge and Hopson, 1990

= Patranomodon =

Patranomodon Temporal range: Middle Permian–Late Permian

Extinct genus of primitive anomodont, South Africa, Permian period

Patranomodon (from Greek πατρ- patr- “father”, thus “father of anomodonts”) is an extinct genus of therapsids belonging to the group Anomodontia. Rubidge and Hopson named this anomodont in 1990 after discovering its skull. Patranomodon is known to have ranged in the Karoo of Southern Africa.

== Discovery and history ==
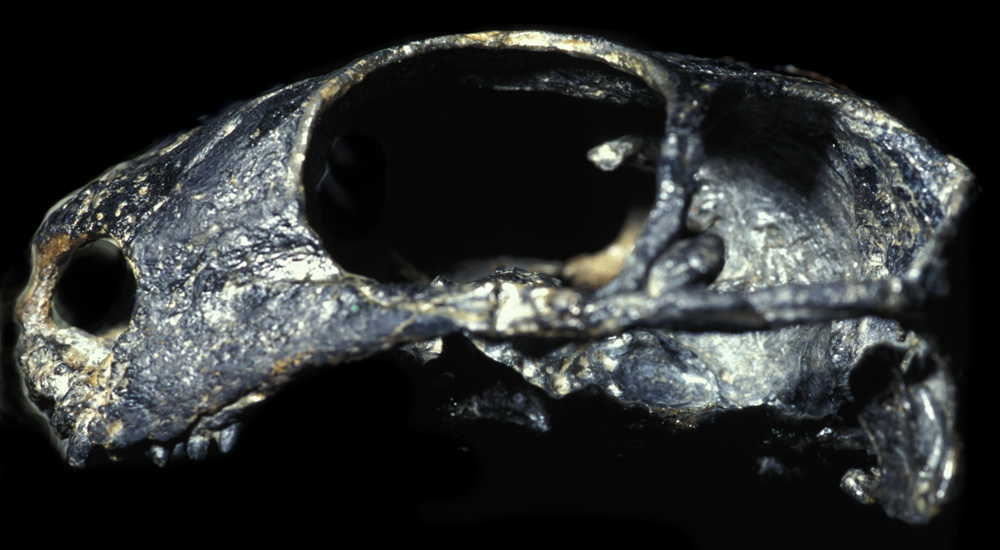
Patranomodon holotype

The skull fossil of Patranomodon was found in the Eodicynodon Assemblage Zone of South Africa, belonging to the lowest biozone of the Beaufort Group. The Beaufort Group time period extends from the middle of the Permian to the early Triassic period. It is one of the three main subdivisions of the Karoo Supergroup in what today is southern Africa. Rubidge and Hopson were the first to discover the skull of Patranomodon. These paleobiologists also named Patranomodon and were the first to publish literature on it starting in 1990. The most abundant remains of Patranomodon were found on the Eastern Cape of South Africa; however, fossil parts were also found in Europe, China, as well as India, which indicated migration occurring among these terrestrial creatures. The paleontologist John Nyaphuli collected the fossil of this creature in South Africa and gave it the species name of "Patranomodon nyaphuli".

== Palaeobiology ==
Patranomodon have a short exposure of their palatine and premaxilla, which creates a shorter face compared to other anomodontons. This gives Patranomodon a shorter facial structure, shorter in length as well as small in size. They also have a reduced tabular, a slit-like interpterygoid vacuity, three sacral vertebrae, and a screw-shape jaw. The genus has many features indicating its herbivorous behavior: the division of the external adductor muscles in the jaw into two separate components, the medial and lateral side, as well as using a propalinal jaw movement while feeding on plant material.

The teeth formation of Patranomodon allows crushing and grinding to occur as the jaws connect and move. Other aspects include widening of the palatal areas for breaking down plant matter in feeding, widening of the external adductors, the higher raised jaw hinge, reduction in the number and size of teeth, and acquiring a horn that extends to the jaw. The transition from its carnivorous ancestor to the herbivorous Patranomodon occurred rapidly compared to the longevity of the species of anomodonts.

== Palaeoecology ==
The environment during the Lopingian epoch of the Permian, when Patranomodon roamed the Earth, was typically aquatic-based, with plentiful precipitation concentrated in the mountains and plateaux of terrestrial habitats. Rainfall was very frequent during this time. There were times of warm humid greenhouse-like climate with soil erosion and stagnation in the wetlands, which may have led to the mass extinctions in middle to late Permian times. These environmental conditions created harsh living conditions for terrestrial creatures, some of which died off. The mass extinction affected most of the terrestrial and aquatic species; however, the terrestrial species evolved greatly after the mass extinction.

Patranomodon was one of the early terrestrial species that evolved from the fully aquatic environments. Flash floods were the main reason why there were sediment deposits, along with overflowing rivers from melting ice caps. Fossilization requires specific factors that allow preservation of hard tissues such as bone. In southern Africa, where Patranomodon lived during the Late Permian epoch, there was probably migration due to the progressive climatic drying and the shrinking of the basin. This migration occurred in a northward direction to warmer environments. Evidence for migration is also found in the distribution of fossils of certain anomodonts northward from the southern cape of Africa.

The Beaufort Group, where Patranomodon was found in the fossil record, dominated most of the basin with fluvial sedimentation. During the Permian period, Europe, Africa, Asia, America, and Antarctica were joined in one large supercontinent called Pangea. Scattered fossils of Anomodonts provide evidence for this huge land mass as well as for migration from one end of the land mass to the other. Fluvial sedimentation refers to the sediment carried by streams and rivers that deposit into landforms, thus preserving the fossil skull of Patranomodon. These streams and rivers were most likely formed by ice masses such as glaciers.

== See also ==
- Anomocephalus
- List of therapsids
- Therapsida
- Permian Extinction
- Beaufort Group
